= List of astrologers =

This is a list of astrologers with Wikipedia articles.

== A ==
- Pietro d'Abano
- Haly Abenragel
- Sumanadasa Abeygunawardena
- Evangeline Adams
- John Addey
- Adelard of Bath
- Heinrich Cornelius Agrippa
- Pierre d'Ailly
- Albertus Magnus
- Albubather
- Alchabitius
- Alcuin
- Paulus Alexandrinus
- Thomas Allen
- Antero Alli
- William Andrews
- Mustapha Adamu Animashaun
- Antiochus of Athens
- Ibn Arabi
- Arcandam
- Stephen Arroyo
- Elias Ashmole
- Madalyn Aslan

== B ==
- Francis Bacon
- Roger Bacon
- Marina Bai
- Alice Bailey
- Tiberius Claudius Balbilus
- Abu Ma'shar al-Balkhi
- Olivia Barclay
- Muhammad ibn Jābir al-Harrānī al-Battānī
- Clifford Bax
- Philip Berg
- Walter Berg
- Berossus
- Bhrigus
- Abū Rayhān al-Bīrūnī
- Joseph Blagrave
- Hannes Bok
- Guido Bonatti
- Tycho Brahe
- Rob Brezsny
- Giordano Bruno

== C ==
- Carl Jung
- Jonathan Cainer
- Tommaso Campanella
- Campanus of Novara
- Nicholas Campion
- Gerolamo Cardano
- Giovanni Domenico Cassini
- Christopher Cattan
- Geoffrey Chaucer
- Cheiro
- Martin Chemnitz
- Henry Coley
- Hermannus Contractus
- Nicolaus Copernicus
- Abiathar Crescas
- Critodemus
- Robert Thomas Cross
- Aleister Crowley
- Nicholas Culpeper

== D ==
- Bejan Daruwalla
- Louis de Wohl
- John Dee
- Shakuntala Devi
- Jeane Dixon
- Dorotheus of Sidon
- William Drummond of Logiealmond
- Gerina Dunwich

== E ==
- Reinhold Ebertin
- Edward'O
- Dennis Elwell
- Epigenes
- Michael Erlewine
- Abraham ibn Ezra

== F ==
- Cyril Fagan
- Rui Faleiro
- Jing Fang
- Barry Fantoni
- Ibrahim al-Fazari
- Muhammad al-Fazari
- Serge Raynaud de la Ferrière
- Jack Fertig
- Marsilio Ficino
- Nigidius Figulus
- Roy C. Firebrace
- Lucius Taruntius Firmanus
- Robert Fludd
- Simon Forman
- Paolo Fox
- Eric Francis
- David Frawley

== G ==
- John Gadbury
- Jacques Gaffarel
- Galileo Galilei
- W. D. Gann
- Rockie Gardiner
- Pierre Gassendi
- Michel Gauquelin
- Luca Gaurico
- Gan De
- David Gans
- Gerard of Cremona
- Gersonides
- Yukteswar Giri
- A. Frank Glahn
- Linda Goodman
- Russell Grant
- Liz Greene

== H ==
- Z'ev ben Shimon Halevi
- Manly Palmer Hall
- Robert Hand
- Erik Jan Hanussen
- Françoise Hardy
- Inbaal Honigman
- Harkhebi
- Thomas Harriot
- Franz Hartmann
- Jābir ibn Hayyān
- Max Heindel
- Hephaistio of Thebes
- Herman of Carinthia
- Hermann of Reichenau
- Hermes Trismegistus
- Christopher Heydon
- Hipparchus
- Hippocrates
- Abraham bar Hiyya
- Gustav Holst
- Margaret Hone
- Deborah Houlding
- Bruno Huber
- Hypatia of Alexandria

== I ==
- Ibn Arabi
- Isaac Israeli ben Joseph

== J ==
- Jaimini
- Joyce Jillson
- John of Eschenden
- Marc Edmund Jones
- Mangal Raj Joshi
- Carl Jung

== K ==
- Johannes Kelpius
- Warren Kenton
- Johannes Kepler
- Muhammad ibn Mūsā al-Khwārizmī
- al-Kindi
- Karl Ernst Krafft

== L ==
- John Lambe
- Bonet de Lattes
- Sybil Leek
- Alan Leo
- Jim Lewis
- Johannes Lichtenberger
- William Lilly
- Guido von List
- Ramon Llull

== M ==
- Magi
- Giovanni Antonio Magini
- Marcus Manilius
- Mantreswara
- Gregory Paul Martin
- Mashallah ibn Athari
- Julius Firmicus Maternus
- Richard Mead
- Philipp Melanchthon
- Walter Mercado
- Merlin
- Franz Mesmer
- Francis Moore
- Marcia Moore
- Pauline Moran
- Jean-Baptiste Morin
- Richard James Morrison
- Mystic Meg

== N ==
- Nostradamus
- Valentine Naibod
- John Napier
- Richard Napier
- Naubakht
- R. H. Naylor
- Don Neroman
- Domenico Maria Novara da Ferrara

== O ==
- Olympiodorus the Younger
- Sydney Omarr
- Haruka Orth

== P ==
- Camille Paglia
- Paracelsus
- Parameshvara
- Parashara
- Derek Parker
- Julia Parker
- William Parron
- John Partridge
- Pellitus
- Georg von Peuerbach
- Porphyry
- Tiphaine Raguenel
- Pseudo-Geber
- Ptolemy
- Pythagoras
- Pothuluru Veerabrahmendra

== Q ==
- Joan Quigley

== R ==
- Bangalore Venkata Raman
- Heinrich Rantzau
- Robert Thomas Cross
- Regiomontanus
- Carl Reichenbach
- Georg Joachim Rheticus
- Rhetorius of Egypt
- Richard of Wallingford
- Ali ibn Ridwan
- Lois Rodden
- Roger of Hereford
- Dane Rudhyar
- Cosimo Ruggeri

== S ==
- Gunter Sachs
- JoJo Savard
- Johannes Schöner
- Michael Scot
- Sepharial
- Shi Shen
- Ebenezer Sibly
- Gautama Siddha
- Mulugu Ramalingeswara Varaprasad Siddhanti
- Gironima Spana
- Karl Spiesberger
- Count of St. Germain
- Johannes Stadius
- Johannes Stöffler
- Jackie Stallone
- Athena Starwoman
- Ludwig Straniak
- Shelley von Strunckel
- Sudines
- Pope Sylvester II

== U ==
- Chandramauli Upadhyay
- Harilal Upadhyay
- Mellie Uyldert

== V ==
- Daivajna Varāhamihira
- John Varley
- Arnaldus de Villa Nova
- Johannes Virdung
- Varāhamihira

== W ==
- Walcher of Malvern
- David Wells
- William of Marseille
- Alfred Witte
- Maurice Woodruff
- Wilhelm Wulff

== Y ==
- Yavanesvara
- William Butler Yeats
- Ibn Yunus

== Z ==
- Abraham Zacuto
- Zadkiel
- C. C. Zain
- Abū Ishāq Ibrāhīm al-Zarqālī

== In literature ==
- Klingsor, four fictional German astrologers
- Professor Trelawney

== See also ==
- Astrology in the medieval Islamic world
- List of alchemists
- List of occultists
