= Hamburg School of Astrology =

Method in Astrology

The German Hamburg School of Astrology (root school of the international Uranian Astrology offshoot) is a school of astrology based on the teachings of surveyor, astrologer and amateur astronomer Alfred Witte. It is characterized by use of astrological midpoints and eight astronomically-deduced hypothetical points, expanding the framework beyond traditional astrology.

== History ==
The Hamburg School was established as an Association as "Astrologenverein Hamburger Schule" on October 31, 1925 in Hamburg. In 1932 the first partner group was established in Düsseldorf by Theodor Keysers.

Early collaborators of Alfred Witte were Friedrich Sieggrün and Ludwig Rudolph, and the Hamburg School's first points beyond Neptune were posited during the astronomical searches leading to the 'discovery' of Pluto (and so classified as 'Transneptunians'). They concluded that the additional points, initially classified as planets but now seen as possible barycenters of planetoid belts, were useful in verifying events not clearly identified by the astronomically-certified planets and asteods of that period. Witte postulated four trans-Neptunian "planets", and in 1927 Sieggrün postulated another four. Witte named his proposals Cupido, Hades, Zeus and Kronos. Sieggrün expanded the list with Apollon, Admetos, Vulkanus and Poseidon.

Ludwig Rudolph printed and published Witte's claims, the core of which were published in the Rules for Planetary Pictures (Regelwerk für Planetenbilder) in 1928. An increasing amount of the research of the Hamburg School revolved around astrological midpoints and use of the hypothetical planets.

In the 1930s, the American Richard Svehla gave lectures on the Hamburg School in the United States, translated the Rules for Planetary Pictures into English, and coined the term "Uranian Astrology" as the English name of the American branch of the school.

Witte and Rudolph were pursued by the Gestapo as enemies of the Third Reich. Witte is supposed to have committed suicide before he could be sent to a concentration camp, and Ludwig Rudolph was interned. The Rules was among the books burned by the Nazis, but copies were preserved by Rudolph.

Reinhold Ebertin, a student of Hamburg School methods, eliminated the use of the hypothetical planets while maintaining the core teachings of the Hamburg School, renamed it "Cosmobiology" (German: Kosmobiologie), and published some of the observations in The Combination of Stellar Influences in 1940, last updated in English in 1972.

After the fall of the Third Reich, the Hamburg School reconvened, and Ludwig Rudolph played the key role in perpetuating the teachings of the Hamburg School. The Hamburg School astrologer Hermann Lefeldt emphasized Witte's hypotheses with astrological traditions such as the use of astrological houses. However, other Hamburg practitioners maintained their focus on working only with astrological midpoints , abandoning traditional practices, including the 12 houses and rulerships, and these practitioners eventually gathered under Ruth Brummund and the title of "Uranische Astrologie".

== Meanings of the hypothetical planets ==
Some astrological meanings of the astrological-observation hypothetical planets are:

- Kronos indicates authority, things that are "high up" like heaven, kings, leaders, sky, etc. Meaning of Kronos
- Cupido means romantic love and can indicate marriage through transits to planets that indicate marriage/love in a natal chart. It also indicates artistic abilities and kinds of partnerships.Meaning of Cupido
- Hades is similar to Pluto, and it can be an indicator of esoteric vocations or vocations dedicated to healing. It can also indicate emotional or mental issues and life wounds. Meaning of Hades
- Zeus indicates creativity and ambitious achievement. It is also a symbol of fertility.Meaning of Zeus
- Poseidon indicates spirituality, similar to Neptune, and its positive qualities are spiritual, Christ-like, enlightened and agapical love. It can indicates psychic abilities and spiritual wisdom.Meaning of Poseidon
- Admetos indicates transformative power, similar to Hades. The difference between Hades and Admetos is that Admetos' power is internal and is hard to release out into the world, while Hades' power can be released by helping others. Admetos also indicates spiritual blockage and depth of knowledge.Meaning of Admetos
- Apollon indicates wisdom throughout life, a balanced temperament, and prophetic dreams.Meaning of Apollon
- Vulcanus indicates overcoming of lifetime handicaps, because Hephaestos (Vulcanus/Vulcan) in Greek mythology isn't as beautiful as other Greek gods; he was exiled from Olympus as a result, but later returned to craft things that helped the other gods. Vulcanus also indicates a brute force of masculine energy that wants freedom.Meaning of Vulcanus

== Associations ==
=== Active ===
- The Uranian Society, New York City/USA, est. 1985 (first announced in 1980).
- The International Uranian Fellowship, The Hague/Netherlands est. 2007
- Nontaburi Uranian Astrology Associations, ฺBangkok/Thailand est 1999 https://www.facebook.com/uranianastrologynonthaburi?mibextid=ZbWKwL

=== Inactive ===
- Astrological Association "Hamburg School", German: Astrologenverein "Hamburger Schule", Hamburg/Germany, est. 1925
- Witte Study Group Düsseldorf, German: Witte-Studiengemeinschaft Düsseldorf, Düsseldorf/Germany, est. 1932
- Uranian Astrology Research Club, Cleveland, Ohio/USA, 1939
- Astrological Study Society (Hamburg School), German: Astrologische Studiengesellschaft (Hamburger Schule), Hamburg/Germany, est. 1947
- The Bangkok Astrological School, Bangkok/Thailand, est. 1972

== Publications ==
- Brummund, Ruth: "Astropsychologische Charaktermerkmale", Ludwig Rudolph (Witte-Verlag), Hamburg 1972.
- Brummund, Ruth: "Regelwerk-Neufassung", Udo Rudolph Verlag, Hamburg 1990.
- Rudolph, Ludwig, and Witte: "Regelwerk für Planetenbilder von Alfred Witte - Die Astrologie von morgen", 1st Edition, Witte-Verlag Ludwig Rudolph, 1928/1929
- Rudolph, Ludwig, and Witte: "Regelwerk für Planetenbilder von Alfred Witte - Die Astrologie von morgen", 2nd Edition, Witte-Verlag Ludwig Rudolph, 1932.
- Rudolph Ludwig, and Witte: "Regelwerk für Planetenbilder von Alfred Witte - Die Astrologie von morgen", 3rd Edition, Witte-Verlag Ludwig Rudolph, Hamburg 1935.
- Rudolph, Rudoph, and H.Lefeldt: "Witte: Regelwerk für Planetenbilder", Ludwig Rudolph (Witte-Verlag), Hamburg. Editions: 1946-50, 1959, 1983, 2012
- Rudolph, Ludwig: "Rulesbook for Planetary Pictures", Ludwig Rudolph (Witte-Verlag), Hamburg 1974, USA 1990 (Second official Hamburg School endorsed translation).
- Schnitzler, Ilse: "Lexikon für Planetenbilder", Ludwig Rudolph (Witte-Verlag), Hamburg 1957, based on 1946 edition of Rulebook.
- Svehla, Richard: "Rulesbook for Planetary Pictures by A.Witte & L.Rudolph", Phoenix Bookshop, Cleveland/Ohio, USA 1939, Endorsed by German Hamburg School. Reprint 2014
- Witte, Alfred: "Immerwahrende Ephemeride fur [...]Cupido, Hades, Zeus und Kronos [...]", Special Edition from "Regelwerk...", Witte-Verlag Ludwig Rudolph, Hamburg 1935.
- Witte, Alfred: "Der Mensch - eine Empfangsstation kosmischer Suggestionen", compiled and commented by Hermann Sporner und L.Rudolph, Ludwig Rudolph (Witte-Verlag), Hamburg 1975.

== See also ==
- Astrological symbols
- Astrological aspects
- Astrology
- Cosmobiology
- Natal chart
