= Astrometeorology =

Belief that astrology can be used for weather prediction

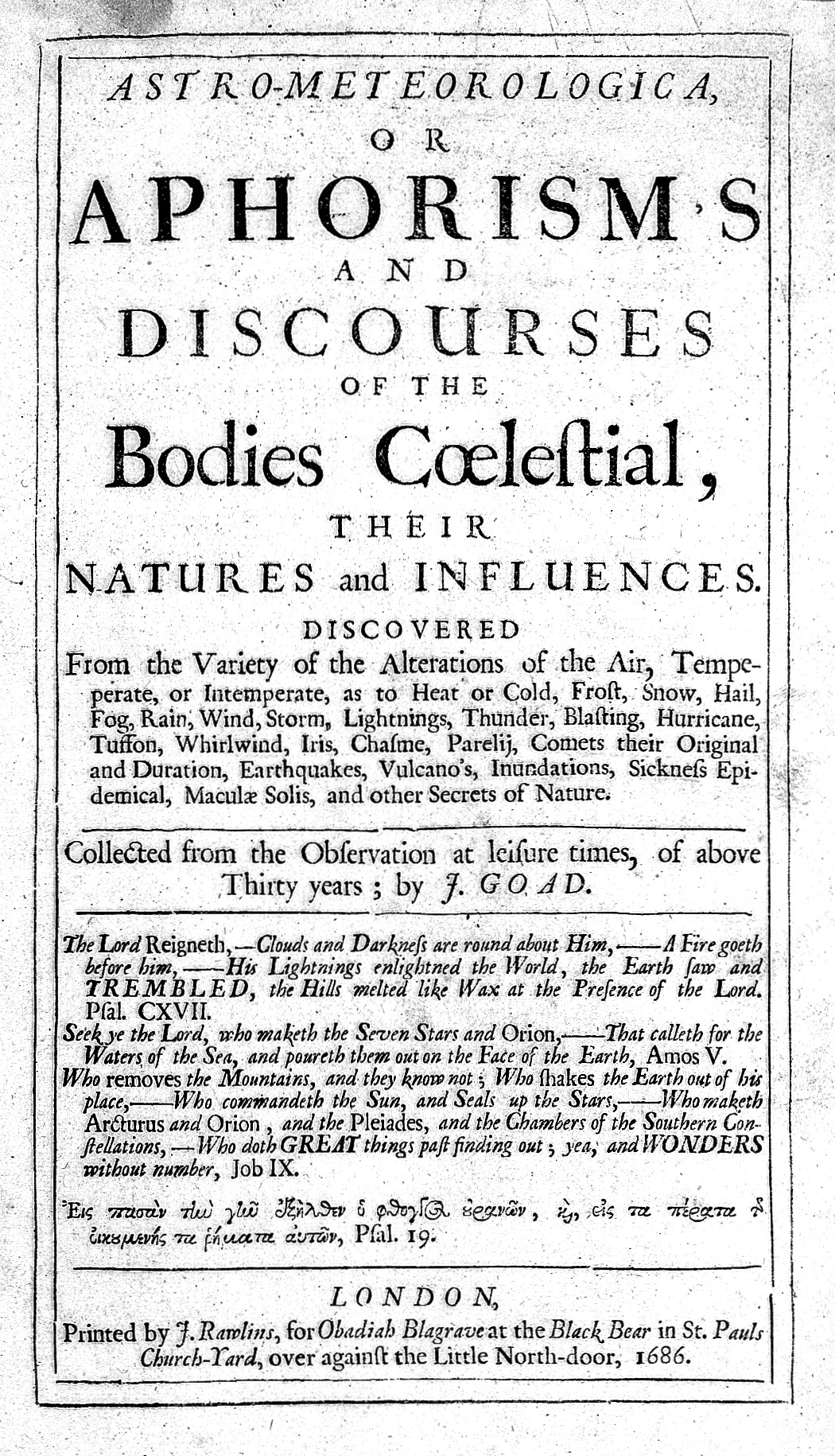
Title page of a discourse on astrometerology by John Goad, 1686

Astrometeorology (from Greek ἄστρον, astron, "constellation, star"; μετέωρος, metéōros, "high in the sky"; and -λογία, -logia, "branch of knowledge") or meteorological astrology is a pseudoscience that attempts to forecast the weather using astrology. It is the belief that the positions and motions of celestial objects can be used to predict both seasonal climate and weather. Throughout most of its history astrometeorology was considered a scholarly tradition and was common in academic circles, often in close relation with other types of astrology, astronomy, alchemy, meteorology, and medicine.

== Principles and application ==
Astrometeorology's core mechanisms share similarities with common astrological practices and beliefs. In Robert Grosseteste's Des impressionibus aeris (On Atmospheric Impressions), an alignment with a sign with a planet of similar nature receives testimony (influence/ power) from the sign and cancels out with an opposing sign. The number of testimonies are then calculated to determine its total effects on Earth, and the planet with the most influence will determine the weather.

Johannes Kepler held beliefs that the planet itself could be influenced by horoscopes in a similar manner to humans. Kepler also attempted to create a calendar that could accurately predict the weather, in addition to predicting agricultural and political events.

== History ==
Meteorological phenomena correlated to planetary configurations were recorded in Babylonia. Classical astrologer Claudius Ptolemy constructed a treatise on forecasting weather via astrological means. Astrometeorology is the oldest type of Hellenistic astrology.

Primary sources for astrometeorology in the Middle Ages are rare, but the number and complexity of what can be found often discuss eccentric weather and non-meteorological events, rather than common occurrences of the area, suggesting it was practiced more by academics than farmers. Some examples of prominent astrologers during the twelfth through fifteenth centuries such as John of Eschenden and Robert Grosseteste. Johannes Kepler recorded meteorological observations starting in 1593 to support his belief that the conjunction of Saturn and the Sun would produce cold weather. Starting in 1598 Kepler produced a calendar that included weather prognostications based on astrology.

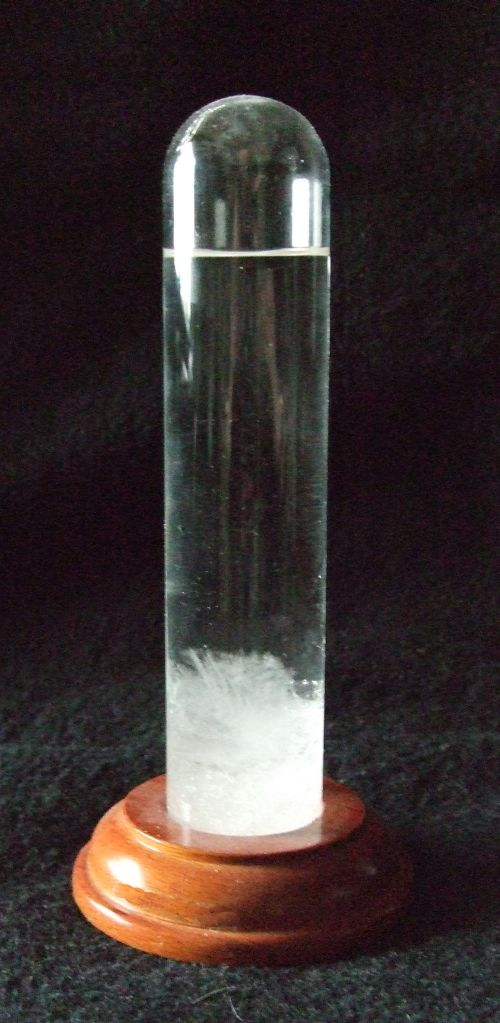
A storm glass, as might have been used by astrometeorologists in the 17th century

There was a movement to modernize astrology in the mid 17th century to make it more empirical that departed from traditional methods of weather prediction; this new tradition had a greater focus on keeping journals of past weather that incorporated instrumental measurements. A notable product of this movement was a large volume written in English devoted to astrometeorology by John Goad: Astro-Meteorologica published in London, England in 1686, while this work likely had a large lay audience, there was little written about it by contemporary academics that were not already sympathetic to astrometeorolgy.

Astrometeorology remained in mainstream scientific discourse through the 17th century but had fallen out of favor by about 1704. Astrometeorological societies persisted in Great Britain until the mid-19th century but were not taken seriously by mainstream scientists. Farmers in India during the 21st century have used a form of astrometeorology based on Nakshatra that is not considered a viable practice.

== See also ==
- Agricultural astrology
- Medical astrology
