= Abeygunawardena =

Abeygunawardena is a Sinhalese surname. Notable people with the surname include:

- Harishchandra Abeygunawardena, Sri Lankan academic
- Hema Abeygunawardena (born 1942), Sri Lankan academic and tireless advocate on behalf of breast cancer patients around the world
- Rohitha Abeygunawardena (born 1966), Sri Lankan politician and businessman
- Sumanadasa Abeygunawardena (born 1953), Sri Lankan astrologer, author, and commentator
