= Houlding =

Houlding is a surname. Notable people with the surname include:

- Deborah Houlding (born 1962), English astrologer
- Chris Houlding, English trombonist
- John Houlding (1833–1902), English businessman, Lord Mayor of Liverpool, founder of Liverpool Football Club
- John Houlding (rower) (born 1962), Canadian rower
- Leo Houlding (born 1980), British rock climber
