= Chandramouli =

Chandramouli is an Indian male given name meaning "moon-crested", a reference to the Hindu god Shiva, and may refer to:

- Anuja Chandramouli (born 1984), Indian author of fantasy and historical fiction
- Kalluri Chandramouli (1898–1992), Indian freedom fighter, philanthropist and scholar
- Lakshmi Priyaa Chandramouli, Indian film and television actress in Tamil cinema
- Varkapur Chandramouli (–2006), Indian Maoist leader
- Chandra Mouli Nagamallaiah (1974–2005), Indian-American murder victim
- Jagarlamudi Chandramouli, namesake of the Rayapati Venkata Rangarao and Jagarlamudi Chandramouli College of Engineering, Guntur, Andhra Pradesh, India
- Chandramouli, titular character in the 2018 Indian sports comedy thriller film Mr. Chandramouli

== See also ==
- Chandramoulisvarar Temple, Arichandrapuram, Shiva temple in India
- Chandramauli Kumar Prasad, Indian judge
- Chandramauli Chopra, known as Ramanand Sagar, Indian filmmaker
- Chandramauli Upadhyay, Indian astrologer
