= John Ward Knowles =

John Ward Knowles (1838–1931) was a prominent British York-based stained-glass manufacturer, and commentator on local art and music.

== Family ==
Knowles may have been related to the civil engineer George Knowles (c. 1776-1856june23: will 1856aug13, ref PROB 11/2237/206), who designed Scarborough's spa promenade and South Cliff Gardens. His brother was William Knowles (1846nov3-1908sep7).

His son John Alder Knowles (1881-1961) continued the craft traditions but also moved with the times. He spent some time studying glass manufacturing methods in the USA before the First World War. Enthused by the work of Tiffany, he attempted an English version of the famous lamps, but charming though his prototypes were, they lacked the delicacy of the originals and failed to catch on.

== Career ==
After training in art, Knowles dabbled in photography. In 1869 John Ward Knowles took the premises at No.41, (The Star Inn) previously the house of Mr Robinson, Hosier. According to his notes he moved there in 1869 and he is shown there in the 1871 & 1872 Directories. His granddaughter, Jill Murray, thinks he was there about 5 years. She mentions that he did a lot of work on the house and took a room over one of the stables in the yard and turned it into a painting room. He removed into No.23 (The Sign of the Bible, now No.35), almost opposite on Stonegate, on his marriage to Jane Annakind in 1874. It then became a Knowles family home for the next one hundred and twenty years. He renovated the building which became a hub of artistic endeavour with workshops producing not only stained glass but all kinds of ecclesiastical decoration including beautiful embroideries and tapestry work produced by the Knowles daughters.

The building still retains much of Knowles' work, installed when he lived here including a collection of priceless late Victorian and Edwardian stained glass.

Knowles continued to live and work here until his death at the age of 93 and his sons continued the business up to 1953. The building remained in the Knowles family until 1999 when it was purchased by Jonathan Cainer to become the world's first psychic museum.

== Works ==
- Knowles archives at Borthwick Institute
- Knowles papers at York City Archives.
- "Splendour by the seaside" in Scarborough
- York Minster
- John Ward Knowles by davewebster14
- Sheriff Hutton church
