= Heliocentric (disambiguation) =

Heliocentric is a superseded astronomical model in which the Earth and planets revolve around the Sun at the center of the universe.

Heliocentric may also refer to:

- Heliocentric (Paul Weller album), 2000
- Heliocentric (The Ocean album), 2010

== See also ==
- The Heliocentrics, a London-based musical collective
- The Heliocentric Worlds of Sun Ra, Volume One, a 1965 album by Sun Ra
- Heliocentric astrology, an approach to astrology using the heliocentric model of the Solar System
- Heliocentric orbit, an orbit around the barycenter of the Solar System
