= Joshua Childrey =

English churchman and academic

Joshua Childrey (1623–1670) was an English churchman and academic, antiquary and astrologer, the archdeacon of Salisbury from 1664. He was a "country virtuoso" (in the sense used at the time, implying intellectual distinction), and an avowed Baconian. He also has been considered a dilettante.

== Life ==
He was the son of Robert Childrey of Rochester, where he was born. He was educated at Rochester grammar school, entered Magdalen College, Oxford in the Lent term of 1640, and became one of the clerks. On the outbreak of the First English Civil War he left Oxford and did not return until the city had surrendered to the forces of the parliament. He took his degree of B.A. on 22 July 1646, and is said to have been expelled from his college in 1648 by the Parliamentary visitation of the University of Oxford.

Until the Restoration Childrey kept a school, at Faversham in Kent. In 1660 he was appointed by Henry Somerset, Lord Herbert as one of his chaplains, and obtained preferment. Having been created M.A. on 24 January 166l, he was installed on 23 January 1664 as archdeacon of Salisbury, and the same year became a prebendary of Salisbury Cathedral, and was appointed to the rectory of Upwey in Dorset.

Childrey died at Upwey on 20 August 1670, and was buried in the chancel of his parish church.

== Works ==
Childrey adopted firmly the stance proposed by Francis Bacon, that the collection of very full sets of data should precede the formulation of hypotheses. With Edmond Halley, he wrote against the credulous acceptance of travellers' tales. It has been argued, however, that when with Thomas Sprat he advocated more attention to phenomena visible in the skies ("meteors", in the term used at the time), he was crossing a line drawn by Bacon that excluded "prodigious" observations. He has been described as a consistent opponent of the interpretation of "prodigies" in ways relying on divine providence and eschatology. Britannica Baconica mentioned causal explanations of prodigies on its title page, and Childrey took a generally cessationist line.

=== Astrology ===
In the early 1650s, under the Protectorate, Childrey was working with Thomas Streete on astrological tables. He published two short astrological works:

- Indago Astrologica, or a brief and modest Enquiry into some principal points of Astrology, 1652, and
- Syzygiasticon instauratum; or an ephemeris of the places and aspects of the planets as they respect the ⊙ as Center of their Orbes. Calculated for 1653 (1653).

In the Indago Astrologica Childrey, though in other ways a convinced Baconian, argued that Bacon's geocentric model of the cosmos was incorrect. Subsequently, he was associated with a group who wished to reform astrology along lines (the heliocentric model and the Baconian method) that would make it compatible with contemporary natural philosophy. Vincent Wing's Harmonicon coeleste (1651) was a related initiative. Others involved were John Gadbury and John Goad. There were supporters of this direction from within the Royal Society, including Elias Ashmole and John Beale.

Weather forecasting was another part of the reform programme of Childrey, Gadbury and Goad. The astrological studies were a dead end, but Childrey's Baconian ephemeris was innovative; and he was led into meteorology, supporting an old theory of a 35-year weather cycle.

=== Britannia Baconica ===
Childrey is best known for Britannia Baconica (1660). Intended as a Baconian natural history, it belonged also to the chorographic natural history tradition, to which Gerard Boate also contributed at the same period. Against the rising English county history genre, it de-emphasised genealogical information, in favour of natural resources. The title alludes to Bacon's Sylva Sylvarum.

The work was built up from 100 notebooks, each devoted to one of the topics of the Parasceve of Bacon. The descriptions of the curiosities mentioned in its pages are mostly taken from previous writers, but there are some of Childrey's own observations. One of them was of the zodiacal light.

Nathaniel Fairfax found the work too miscellaneous, and the reports often unresolved, and complained about it to Henry Oldenburg. It was popular, however, and is supposed to have influenced Robert Plot's compilation of a Natural History of Oxfordshire. Childrey explicitly recommended a plain style, as Plot did. The work has also been suggested as an influence on Carl Linnaeus when he was writing on Swedish provinces.

=== Tides ===
Childrey made observations on the tides at Weymouth, near Upwey. These led him, around 1669, to contest the views of John Wallis and Samuel Colepresse of Plymouth, on the occurrence of the highest tides in February and November; he attributed their findings mainly to winds. His own work had led him to think the Moon's perigee was relevant.

Wallis was already embroiled in correspondence on tides with another "country virtuoso", Francis Jessop, but Childrey had a better case. The debate arising, on spring tides, was published in the Transactions of the Royal Society, after Childrey had communicated with Seth Ward. The oceanographer George Deacon later criticised Wallis's attitude, and Childrey's view is thought to be closer to the truth.

== Notes ==
Attribution

This article incorporates text from a publication now in the public domain: Stephen, Leslie, ed. (1887). "Childrey, Joshua". Dictionary of National Biography. Vol. 10. London: Smith, Elder & Co.
