= Massiliensis =

Massiliensis is a surname. Notable people with the surname include:

- Guillelmus Massiliensis thirteenth century English astrologer
- Joannes Massiliensis (c. 370 – 435), Christian theologian
