= George Parker (astrologer) =

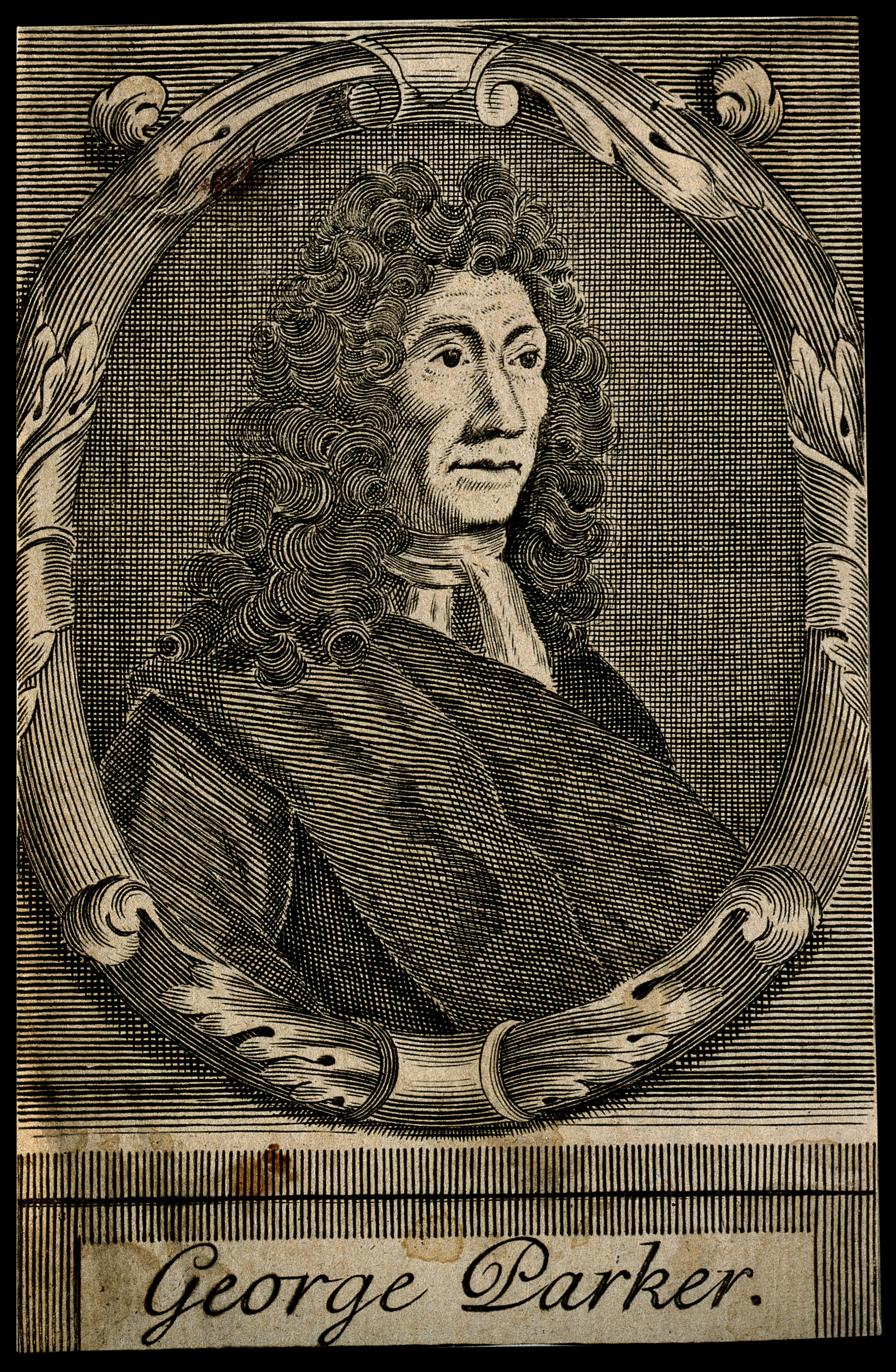
George Parker

George Parker (1654–1743) was an English astrologer and almanac maker, known as a controversialist.

== Life ==
Born at Shipton-upon-Stour, Worcestershire, Parker was originally in business as a cutler in Newgate Street, London, and by upbringing Quaker. He then took a larger shop, but became bankrupt in 1693, and mistreated his wife and children. In 1698 he was keeping a tavern.

His mathematical abilities gained Parker friends; it is said that Edmond Halley occasionally employed him. Edward Thwaites was one of Parker's supporters, and Thomas Hearne was a friend. He established himself as an astrologer and quack doctor at the "Ball and Star" in Salisbury Court, Strand; his presence offended John Partridge, who carried on a similar trade at the "Blue Ball" in Salisbury Street.

Parker died on 16 July 1743, aged 92.

== Works ==
In 1690 Parker began publishing of an almanac, Mercurius Anglicanus; or the English Mercury, London, which continued under his name until 1781. In 1703 it was called A Double Ephemeris, and in 1707 Parker's Ephemeris. The number for 1720 was entitled Parker's Mercurius Anglicanus, but the title of Parker's Ephemeris resumed the following year. Having included in one of his almanacs the Chevalier de St. George, in other words the Old Pretender, among the sovereigns of Europe, he was fined and forbidden to publish any more almanacs; he printed for some time a bare calendar, with the saints' days only.

In 1696 Parker interpreted some vague language in Partridge's almanac as derogatory to him, and hit back in 1697. Partridge replied with bitterness in his Defectio Geniturarum (1697–8), the appendix of which, called Flagitiosus Mercurius Flagellatus; or the Whipper whipp'd, was devoted to abuse of Parker. Partridge returned to the attack in a pamphlet The Character of a broken Cutler, and in his Merlinus Liberatus for 1699. Parker also engaged in controversy with John Wing, nephew of Vincent Wing, and Francis Moore, Whig rivals in the same trades.

Parker revised the tenth edition of William Eland's Tutor to Astrology (1704), and edited John Gadbury's Ephemerides of the Celestial Motions for XX years (1709–28) in 1709. In 1719 he issued the first number of a West India Almanack, London, but did not continue it.

== Family ==
Parker's wife Elizabeth was a Quaker widow, while Parker himself moved away from his Quaker background; they married around 1678. The marriage broke down by 1693, and Parker became a High Church Tory. They had three children, baptised in the Church of England in 1688.
