= Heliocentric astrology =

Form of astrology based on the heliocentric model

Heliocentric astrology is an approach to astrology centered around birth charts cast using the heliocentric model of the Solar System, positioning the Sun at the center. In contrast to geocentric astrology, which places Earth at the center, heliocentric astrology interprets planetary positions from the Sun's vantage point. While geocentric astrology considers elements like the ascendant, midheaven, houses, Sun, Moon, and planetary aspects, heliocentric astrology focuses primarily on planetary aspects and configurations. Astrologers often use this method in conjunction with geocentric astrology to access insights beyond the traditional framework.

The roots of heliocentric astrology extend back to Copernicus's 16th-century work on heliocentrism. Early pioneers like Andreas Aurifaber and later practitioners like Joshua Childrey challenged geocentric perspectives during the 17th century. They proposed that astrology could align with contemporary natural philosophy, finding support from figures within the Royal Society. In the late 19th century, Holmes Whittier Merton's book Heliocentric Astrology: Or, Essentials of Astronomy and Solar Mentality emphasized the relationship between astronomy and the Sun's influence on mentality.

== Description ==
Most forms of astrology are geocentric. The geocentric horoscope is drawn with the Earth at the center, and the planets are placed around the cartwheel in the positions that they would appear in the sky as seen by a person who is looking at them from the center of the Earth.

The Greek language word "helios" means the Sun. Heliocentric astrology draws birth charts with the Sun at the center, and the planets are placed around the cartwheel in the positions that they would appear if someone looked at them from the center of the Sun.

Geocentric astrology relies heavily on the ascendant, midheaven, houses, the Sun, the Moon, planetary aspects (astrological aspects) and placements of birth planets in the houses and signs. But heliocentric astrology does not have houses (due to not having a location on the surface of the Sun to compute houses for), the ascendant or midheaven, and there are no lunar nodes or retrograde motion in heliocentric birth charts. Instead, heliocentric astrology depends primarily on planetary aspects and configurations for interpretation. For this reason, no astrologer uses heliocentric astrology to the exclusion of geocentric astrology. But supporters of heliocentric astrology believe that it can reveal much that geocentric astrology cannot and therefore recommend that all astrologers add heliocentric astrology chart analysis as a supplement to geocentric astrology.

== History ==
The first astrologer to consider applying the new heliocentric model of Copernicus (1473–1543) was Andreas Aurifaber (1514–1559).

In the early 1650s, under the Protectorate, Joshua Childrey (1623–1670) was working with Thomas Streete on astrological tables. He published two short astrological works:

- Indago Astrologica, or a brief and modest Enquiry into some principal points of Astrology, 1652, and
- Syzygiasticon instauratum; or an ephemeris of the places and aspects of the planets as they respect the ⊙ as Center of their Orbes. Calculated for 1653 (1653).

In the Indago Astrologica Childrey, though in other ways a convinced Baconian, argued that Francis Bacon's geocentric model of the cosmos was incorrect. Subsequently he was associated with a group who wished to reform astrology along lines (the heliocentric model and the Baconian method) that would make it compatible with contemporary natural philosophy. Vincent Wing's Harmonicon coeleste (1651) was a related initiative. Others involved were John Gadbury and John Goad. There were supporters of this direction from within the Royal Society, including Elias Ashmole and John Beale.

In 1899, a book dedicated to the heliocentric form of astrology, Heliocentric Astrology: Or, Essentials of Astronomy and Solar Mentality by Holmes Whittier Merton, was published. A recent reprint (Merton 2017) is available.

== See also ==
- John Dee
