= 35 Stonegate =

Listed building in York, England

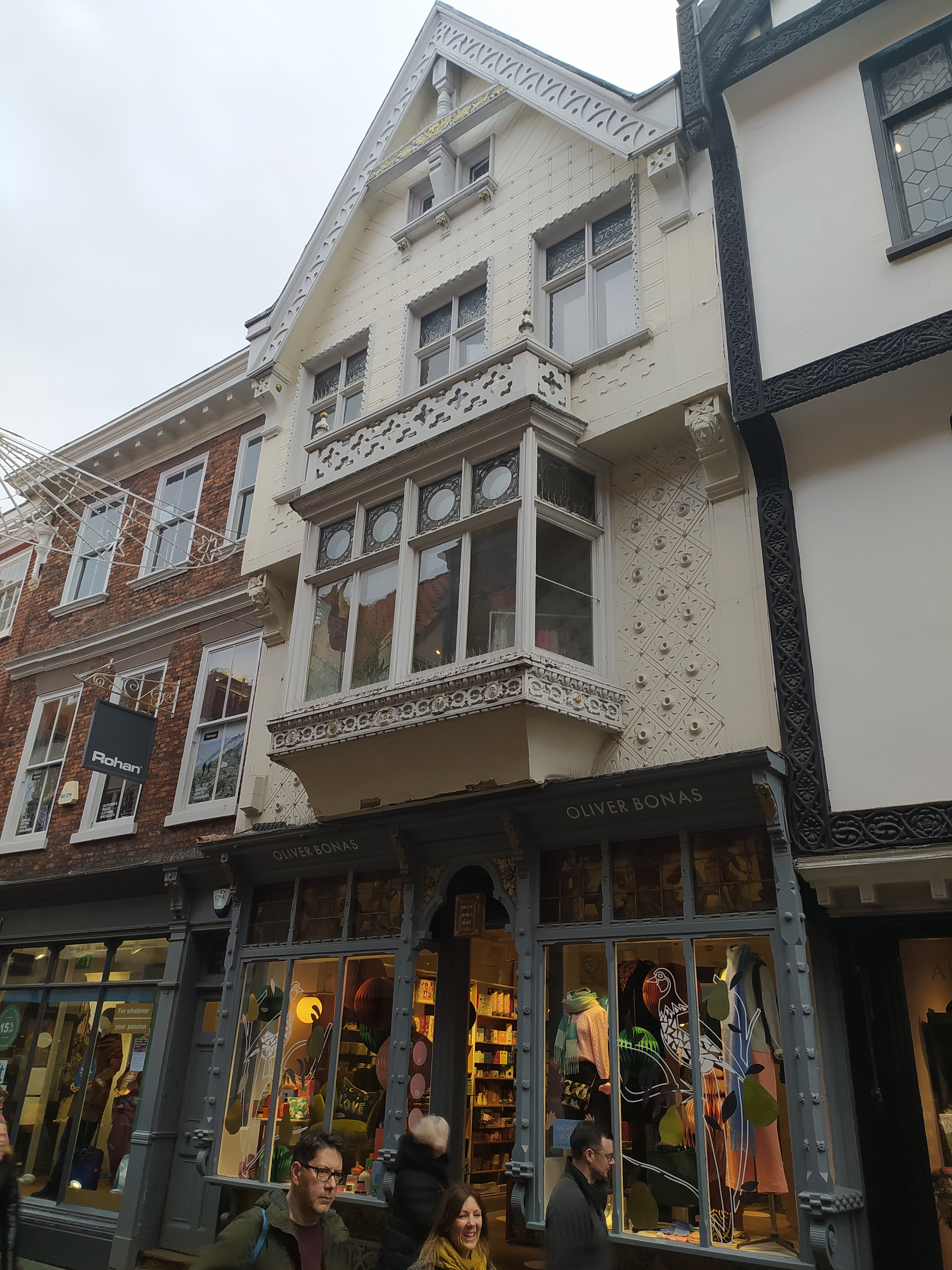
- The building in 2021
- Interactive map of the 35 Stonegate area

General information
- Location: Stonegate, York, England
- Coordinates: 53°57′40″N 1°04′58″W
- Years built: 15th century (front section); Early 17th century (rear wing); Late 17th century (linking block)
- Renovated: Late 19th century (altered and shopfront); 20th century (altered)

Technical details
- Floor count: 3

Design and construction
- Designations

Listed Building – Grade II*
- Official name: At the Sign of the Bible
- Designated: 1 July 1968
- Reference no.: 1256524

35 Stonegate is a Grade II* listed building in the city centre of York, England.

The building lies on Stonegate, one of the most historic streets in the city. From the early 14th century, the site was owned by the Prebend of Bramham. The front section of the current building was constructed in the 15th century, a timber-framed, three-storey range facing the street. In the early 17th century, a separate two-storey timber-framed building was built at the rear of the plot, possibly to serve as workshops. In about 1700, a further block was built, in brick, joining the two existing ranges together. The front building was altered at the same time, with a new staircase inserted.

In 1682, Francis Hildyard opened a bookshop in the building, known as "At the Sign of the Bible". From 1762 until 1811, it was a library and bookshop owned by John Todd. In 1759, the previous owner, John Hinxman, sold the first 200 copies of Laurence Sterne's novel, The Life and Opinions of Tristram Shandy, Gentleman, now commemorated in a York Civic Trust plaque. The property continued to operate as a bookshop until 1872, when it was purchased by John Ward Knowles, a stained glass maker. In 1874, he completed a renovation of the building. This includes a decorative facade, loosely inspired by the Tudor style, the ground floor shopfront, a bay window in the rear section, and a large amount of stained glass. The stained glass business closed in 1931, but the Knowles family continued living in the building until the 1990s.

In reference to the building's history, there is a sign above the door depicting a bible, with "HOLY BIBLE 1682" written on it. The first and second floors are both jettied, and both the 1682 date and the date of the 1874 restoration are inscribed on the front. Inside, the ground floor has 17th-century panelling, and the staircase of about 1700 survives, as do many doors of similar date. There is an 18th-century fireplace on the first floor. On the ground floor is a Gothic-style Victorian fireplace, and some ornate cupboards also dating from the restoration.

In 1999, the building was purchased by astrologer Jonathan Cainer, who initially sold horoscopes from it. In 2004, he worked with Uri Geller to relaunch it as the Museum of Psychic Experience. Derek Acorah filmed an episode of Ghost Towns Live in the building in 2006. The following year, Cainer transformed the building into Haunted, a haunted house attraction, which closed in 2014. In 2015, it became the first Oliver Bonas shop in the north of England.

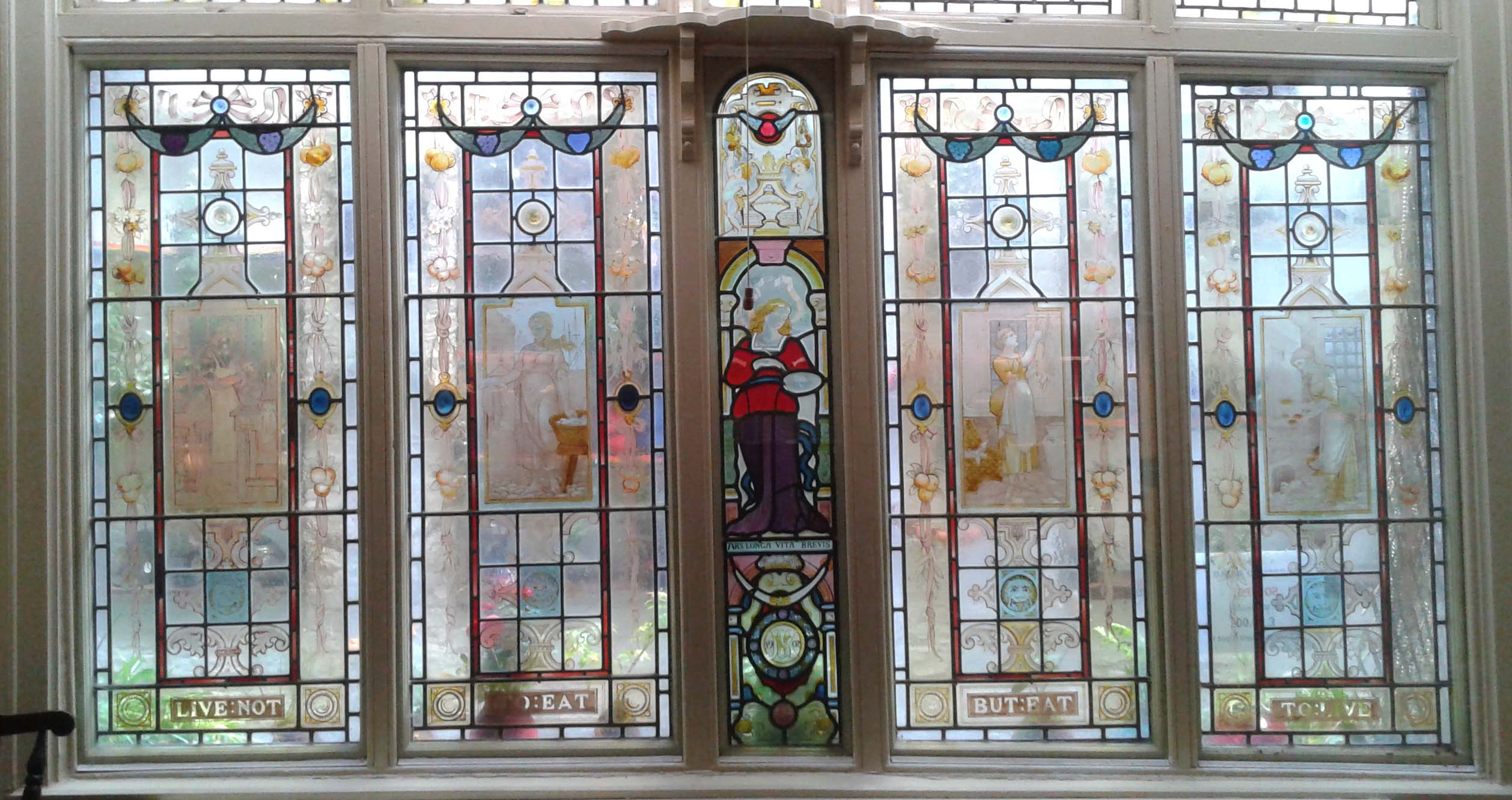
Stained glass in the first floor window

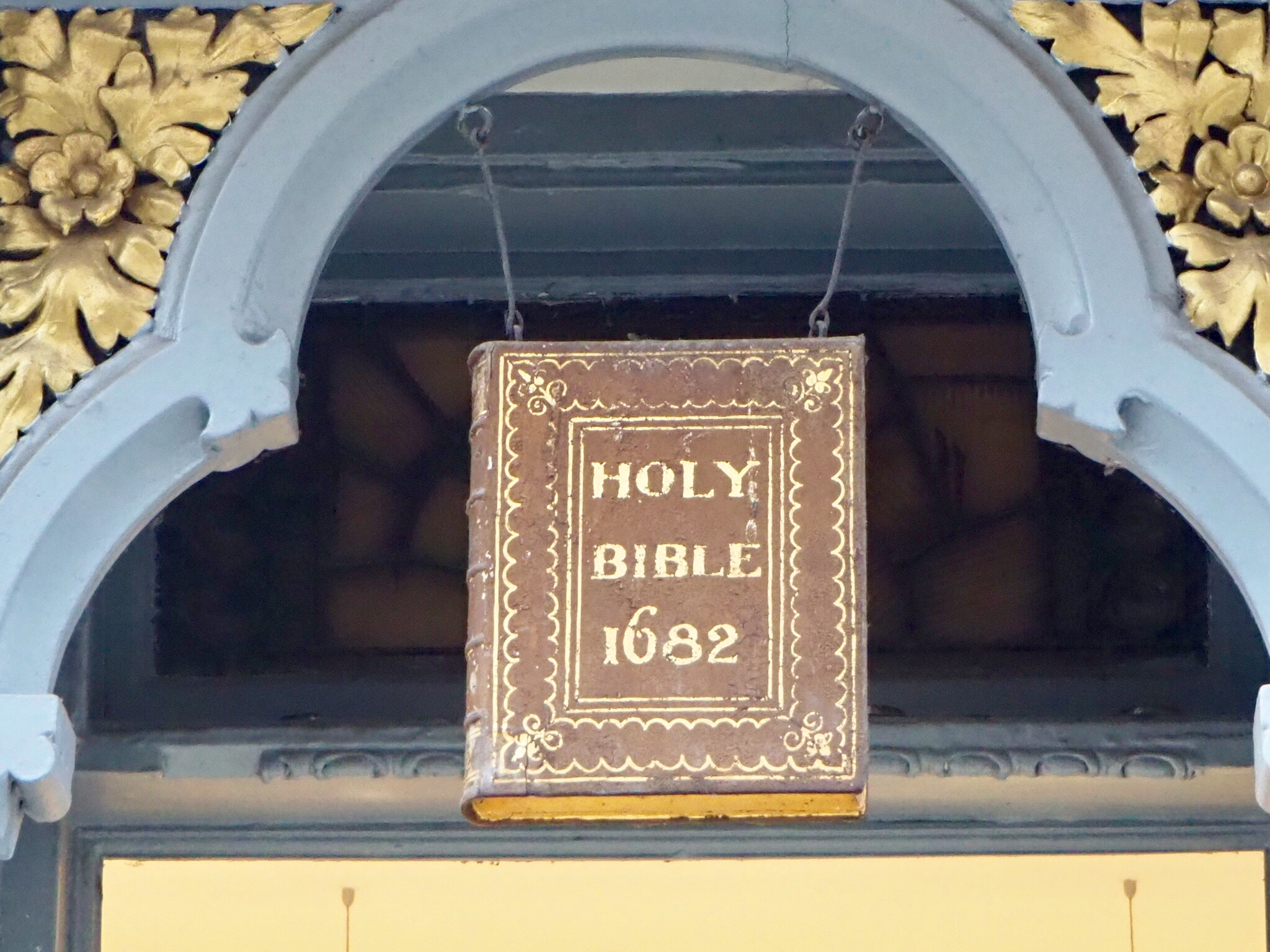
The "Holy Bible" sign

== See also ==
- Grade II* listed buildings in the City of York
- Listed buildings in York (within the city walls, northern part)
