= Cosmobiology =

German medical astrology chart

Historically, the term 'Kosmobiologie' was used by the German medical astrologer Friedrich Feerhow and Swiss statistician Karl Krafft in a more general sense "to designate that branch of astrology working on scientific foundations and keyed to the natural sciences".

The term cosmobiology was popularized in English after the translation of the writings of Reinhold Ebertin, who based a large part of his techniques on the midpoint-astrology work of Alfred Witte. The term most frequently refers to the school of astrology founded by Ebertin. The main difference between Witte's Hamburg School and Ebertin's Cosmobiology is that Cosmobiology rejects the imaginary trans-Neptunian planets invented by the Hamburg School. Another difference is the significant expansion of Cosmobiology into medical astrology, Ebertin being a physician.

Cosmobiology continued Witte's ultimate primary emphasis on the use of astrological midpoints along with the following 8th-harmonic aspects in the natal chart, which both Witte and Ebertin found to be the most potent in terms of personal influence: conjunction (0°), semi-square (45°), square (90°), sesquiquadrate (135°), and opposition (180°).

In cosmobiological analysis, planets are inserted into a special type of horoscope often referred to as a 'Cosmogram' (derived from the Uranian 90° dial chart) and delineated.

The primary reference/research text for Cosmobiology was first published in 1940 by the German astrologer Reinhold Ebertin. The name of the book is The Combination of Stellar Influences. The original German title is Kombination der Gestirneinflüsse. Its foundations were derived largely from the early versions of the "Regelwerk für Planetenbilder" by Alfred Witte, and then further built upon by Ebertin and colleagues.

Ebertin defined Cosmobiology as the following:

Cosmobiology is a scientific discipline concerned with the possible correlation between the cosmos and organic life and the effects of cosmic rhythms and stellar motion on man, with all his potentials and dispositions, his character and the possible turns of fate; it also researches these correlation and effects as mirrored by earth's plant and animal life as a whole. In this endeavor, Cosmobiology utilises modern-day methods of scientific research, such as statistics, analysis, and computer programming. It is of prime importance, however, in view of the scientific effort expended, not to overlook the macrocosmic and microcosmic interrelations incapable of measurement.

Three prominent published Cosmobiological authors in the English language are German-American cosmobiologist Eleonora Kimmel, American cosmobiologist Aren Ober (formerly Savalan), and Australian cosmobiologist Doris Greaves, all of whom have published texts in Cosmobiology based on their own substantial experiences.
