= Astrological Association of Great Britain =

British astrological organisation

The Astrological Association is a British astrological organisation. The Astrological Association of Great Britain (AA) was formed in London on 21 June 1958. Its founding members, notably John Addey and Roy Firebrace, were members of the Astrological Lodge of the Thesosophical Society. John Addey later become President of the AA. The AA produces three publications - the Astrological Journal, published six times a year, Correlation, published biannually, and the Medical Astrology Newsletter. In 2002 the AA said their membership was "something over a thousand".

In 2013 the organisation was awarded charity status and the name was legally changed to 'The Astrological Association'.

== Aims and Objectives ==
The aims of the Astrological Association are: the advancement of education of the public by the critical study of astrology in all its branches; to encourage and draw together all students of astrology; to enlarge and integrate the knowledge of astrology; to co-ordinate and publish results as desirable and generally work for the more widespread understanding of astrology.

It holds events and seminars throughout the year, along with an annual conference that draws astrologers from all over the world.
