= Andreas Aurifaber =

German physician (1514–1559)

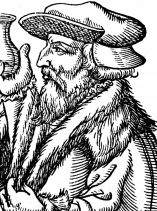
Andreas Aurifaber

Andreas Aurifaber (born Goldschmidt, 1514 – 12 December 1559) was a German physician of some repute, but through his influence with Albert of Brandenburg, last grand-master of the Teutonic Knights, and first Protestant duke of Prussia, became an outstanding figure in the controversy associated with Andreas Osiander whose daughter he had married.

== Early life and education ==
Andreas Aurifaber was born in Breslau (Wrocław); Johannes Aurifaber of Breslau was his younger brother. He studied at the University of Wittenberg in 1527, and there became a friend of Philip Melanchthon. In 1529 he became rector of the Latin school at Danzig (Gdańsk), and two years later accepted a similar post at Elbing (Elbląg). The bounty of Duke Albert of Prussia enabled him to pursue the study of medicine at Wittenberg and in Italy.

== Career ==
After 1545 Aurifaber was physician to the Duke and professor of physics and medicine in the newly established University of Königsberg. There he wrote a number of treatises on physics and physiology.

In 1550 he married a daughter of Osiander, and became involved in the bitter controversy aroused by the latter's views on justification and grace. After Osiander's death in 1552, Aurifaber, who in the preceding year had been made rector of the university, became the leader of the Osiandrian faction and made use of his office and his influence over the duke to crush the rival faction in Prussia, driving its adherents from the university in 1554. He went on to travel extensively throughout Germany, aroused the hatred of the conservatives, who assailed him with extreme virulence. Aurifaber, however, retained his influence until his death, which occurred suddenly, in the antechamber of the Duke in Königsberg, on December 12, 1559.

== See also ==
- Heliocentric astrology
