= Elsbeth Ebertin =

German astrologer (1880–1944)

Elsbeth Ebertin (14 May 1880 – 28 November 1944) was a German graphic artist, writer and astrologer. Elsbeth used the pseudonym Elsa Gorlizia in her writings.

She is most notable for predicting the rise of Adolf Hitler.

She was the mother of Reinhold Ebertin, who was also a publisher and astrologer.

== Life and work ==
Eslbeth was born on 14 May 1880 in Görlitz, Germany.

She was interested in philosophy and graphology at an early age and from 1900 onward she was active as a writer for various magazines. She became a well known astrology publicist after World War I. It has been reported the former king of Bulgaria was one of her customers.

In 1923 a supporter of Adolf Hitler sent Ebertin the 34-year-old future leader's detailed birth date, while concealing his identity. She drew up a horoscope based on the given birth date of 20 April 1889, Sun at 29° in Aries. (Hitler's Sun actually stood at 00° 49' in Taurus.) Statements in this horoscope were later interpreted as a prediction of the Beer Hall Putsch of 8 November 1923. Ebertin - who could easily have inferred the subject's identity - was very impressed by Hitler and his ideas, as can be seen in her publication of the horoscope in June 1923:

"It seems almost as if the one I mean, under a strong Aryan influence of destiny, the fate destined for the German people to sacrifice, and to boldly and bravely endure everything, even if it were a question of life or death. But at the very least to give the impetus to a German movement of liberation, which will then suddenly be heard...."

In 1935, Ebertin sent flowers and a collection of poems to Hitler with a personal dedication. She wrote:

"For my leader's birthday, a bouquet of German poets in deference and fidelity, Elsbeth Ebertin, Weinsberg, Heilbronn, 1835."
"The favorite flowers of the German emperors and the leader Adolf Hitler, a review and a look around, a journey through five decades: imperialism, war, revolution, inflation, decline and the rise of Germany."

== Death ==
Elsbeth died on 28 November 1944 in Freiburg, Germany at the time of an Allied bomb attack during World War II.

== Works ==
- Sternblätter (1915)
- Königliche Nativitäten (1916)
- Die Nativität Hindenburgs (1917)
- Ein Blick in die Zukunft. Jahrbuch (1918 ff)
- Sternenwandel und Weltgeschehen (zusammen mit Ludwig Hoffmann, 1924)
- „Die Macht des Goldes“. Ein Roman von Himmelskräften und Teufelskunst. 1936 (Richard Hummel Verlag)
- Wie die Frauen in der Liebe sind - Graphologische Charakterstudien (ca. 1910)
- Wie die Männer in der Liebe sind - Graphologische Charakterstudien (ca. 1910)

In 1926 "In the Stars", a film adaptation of her novel "Der Mars im Todeshaus" was released in many German cities, according to a report in the Berlin journal Die Filmwoche (No. 19). As astrology was taken seriously in Germany, the Nazis attempted to suppress any associations and publications concerning astrology. The suppression continued as Hitler and the Nazis increased their power, until they imposed a complete ban on astrology in the later years of their rule.

== Literature ==
- Ebertin, Elsbeth. In: Deutschlands, Österreich-Ungarns und der Schweiz Gelehrte, Künstler und Schriftsteller in Wort und Bild. Zweite Ausgabe. Bio-bibliographischer Verlag Albert Steinhage, Hannover 1910, S. 167–168.
- Ellic Howe: Uranias Kinder: die seltsame Welt der Astrologen und das Dritte Reich. Beltz & Athenäum, Weinheim 1995, ISBN 3-89547-710-9
