= Midpoint (astrology) =

Mathematical point halfway between two stellar bodies

A midpoint is a mathematical point halfway between two stellar bodies that tells an interpretative picture for the individual. There are two types of midpoints: direct and indirect. A direct midpoint occurs when a stellar body makes an aspect to the midpoint of two other stellar bodies with an actual physical body at the halfway point. In other words, a direct midpoint means that there is actually a stellar body in the natal chart lying in the midpoint of two other stellar bodies. An indirect midpoint occurs when a stellar body makes an aspect to the midpoint of two other stellar bodies without a physical body at this midpoint.

Midpoints were first used as Half-Sums by Ptolemy in the 2nd century, with the concepts of the 1st and 2nd harmonics. Midpoints were known and used to calculate Arabian Lots or Parts, like part of fortune in the 3rd century. Guido Bonati used direct midpoints (1123–1300) in the 13th century to refine timings in an event chart. Alfred Witte was the first person to do a lot of investigation on midpoints using movable dials and together with Ludwig Rudolph and Herman Lefeldt formed the Hamburg School of Astrology and the technique with the use of Trans Neptunian points was called the Uranian Astrology. Then, Reinhold Ebertin in his book Combination of Stellar influences included psychological principles and simplified the midpoint technique, removing the Trans Neptunians used by the Hamburg School. These were further popularized by American authors Aren Ober (formerly Savalan) and Eleanor Kimmel.
