= Faculty of Astrological Studies =

UK-based school of astrology

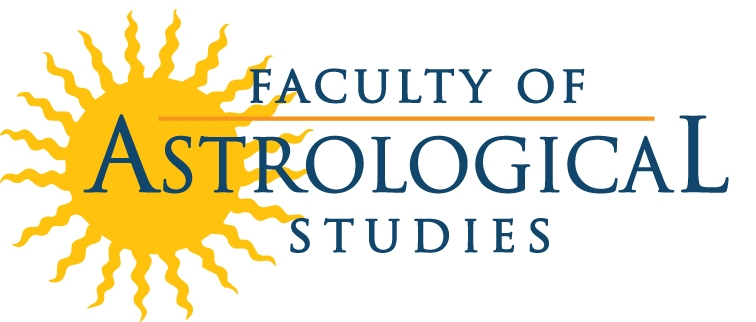
- Abbreviation: FAS
- Formation: 7 June 1948; 78 years ago
- Legal status: Company limited by guarantee
- Purpose: Astrological education

The Faculty of Astrological Studies (FAS) is a UK-based school of astrology, founded in London on 7 June 1948.

== History ==
The Faculty of Astrological Studies was founded under the auspices of the Astrological Lodge of London. Its founders were Charles Carter, Edmund Caselli, Margaret Hone, Basil Koop (known as Regulus) and Lorenz von Sommaruga. It became independent of the Lodge in 1954.

Its August 1948 prospectus set out plans to develop a syllabus, provide tuition and hold intermediate and final examinations in astrology.

Carter served as the Faculty's first principal from 1948 to 1954 and was succeeded by Hone, who held the position until 1969. John Addey was also a member of the Faculty's council. Jeff Mayo succeeded Hone in 1969. Julia Parker served as president from 1973 to 1979.

Two former tutors, Liz Greene and Howard Sasportas, founded the Centre for Psychological Astrology in London in 1983.

== Teaching ==
The Faculty offers courses through distance learning, online classes and classes in London. A 2005 description of its syllabus listed history, astronomy, psychology, counselling methods and astrological techniques among the subjects taught. Holders of its diploma are required to sign its code of ethics. It also holds an annual summer school in Oxford.

In 2008, Steve M. Weiss reported that more than 10,000 students from 90 countries had enrolled at the Faculty since its foundation.

The Faculty is a member of the Advisory Panel on Astrological Education.

== Patrons ==
As of November 2026, the Faculty lists Robert Hand, Liz Greene, Clare Martin, Julia Parker and Melanie Reinhart as its patrons.
