= Jonathan Cainer =

British astrologer (1957–2016)

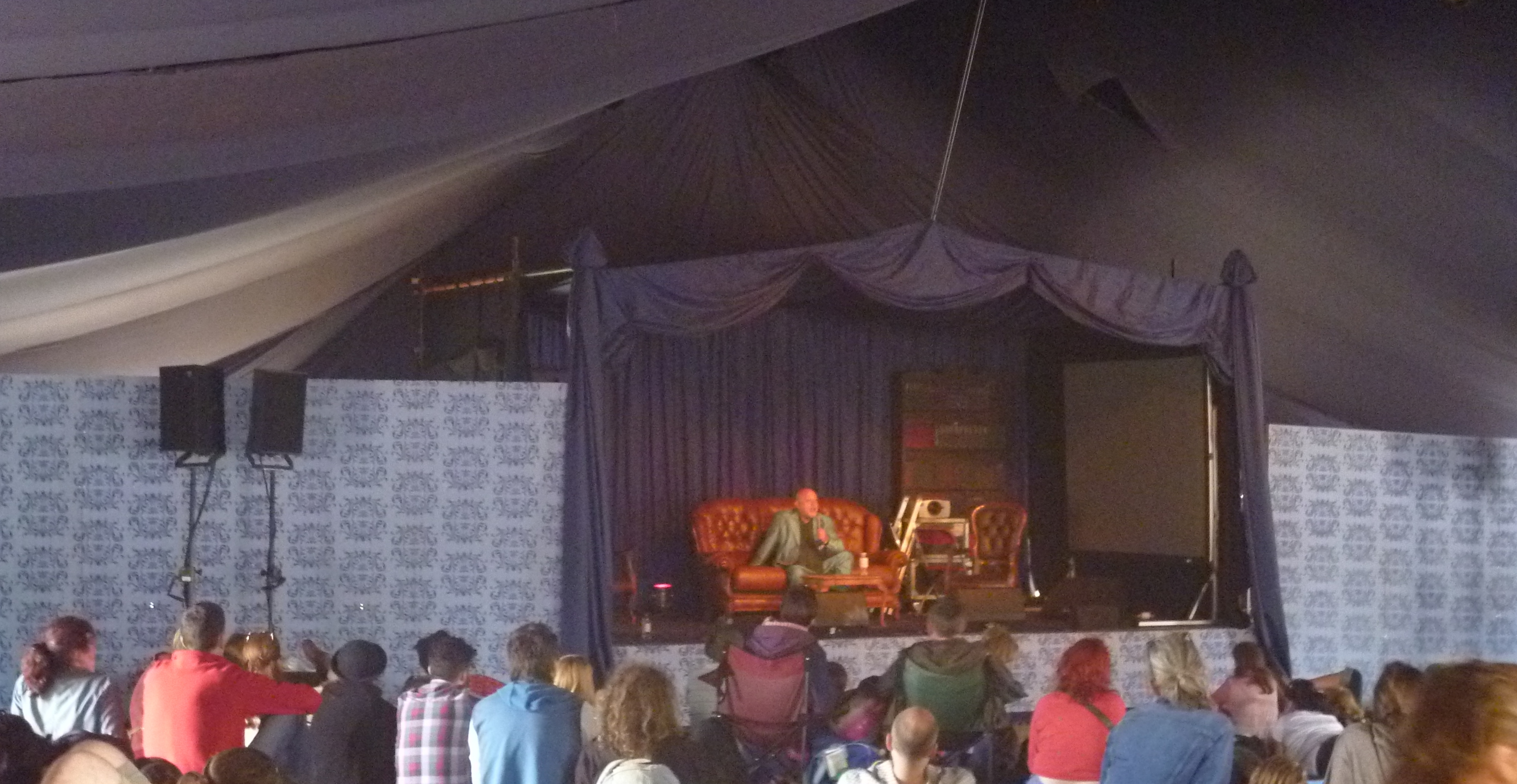
- Cainer on stage at the 2013 Latitude Festival
- Born: 18 December 1957; Surbiton, England
- Died: 2 May 2016 (aged 58)
- Citizenship: UK
- Occupations: Astrologer, journalist, author
- Writing career
- Genre: Astrology
- Notable works: Jonathan Cainer's Guide to the Zodiac; Cosmic Ordering; Complete Book of the Zodiac; Jonathan Cainer's Guide to the Zodiac; The Psychic Explorer; The Junk Food Vegetarian
- Website: www.cainer.com

Jonathan Cainer (18 December 1957 – 2 May 2016) was a British astrologer. He wrote astrological predictions six days a week for the Daily Mail, and forecasts for three Australian newspapers: the Sydney Daily Telegraph, the Melbourne Herald Sun, and the Perth Sunday Times. Cainer's predictions were also published in Hello, the Auckland Sunday News, the Botswana Echo, and Misty Magazine (Japan). It has been estimated that over twelve million people read his predictions.

== Early life ==
Cainer was born to a Jewish family and grew up in Surbiton (then in Surrey), one of six children of David who worked at Barclays Bank and Ruth who was a medical secretary and spiritual healer. Aged 13, he followed his mother to Leeds where he attended Allerton Grange School which he left at 15 without qualifications. He then worked as a petrol pump attendant, school nursery assistant and factory worker. He also played bass guitar in a band called Strange Cloud, attended rock festivals and helped to relaunch the 1960s underground newspaper International Times. He then managed a nightclub on the outskirts of Los Angeles.

== Career ==
He was working as a session musician when an acquaintance read his birth chart to him. Amazed by how accurately it summed him up, Cainer went on to study with the Faculty of Astrological Studies. He was interested only in drawing up full horoscopes, based on people's exact date, time and place of birth. Indeed, when first approached, back in 1984 to write a sun sign forecast column, he turned down the offer, opting instead to write books designed to help students learn the language of planetary symbolism. Cainer also co-designed one of the first astrological computer programs. In 1985 he wrote Jonathan Cainer's Love Signs, and a cookbook, The Junk Food Vegetarian.

In 1986, when Eddie Shah launched Today, Cainer was approached once more to write a daily Sun sign column. Assured that he would also have the chance to introduce his readers to the deeper side of his subject, Cainer took the post, and his column proved a great success. He left Today in January 1992 and joined the Daily Mail in December of the same year. His Times obituary said that he was "arguably the only hippy ever to write a leading column for the Daily Mail". Cainer disliked the editorial stances of the Daily Mail, he "never once agreed with an editorial they have published". Cainer was a philanthropist who supported the Steiner School in York, a school based on the spiritual and philosophical principles of Rudolf Steiner. In January 2000, he moved from the Daily Mail to the Daily Express. The change was the subject of a contract dispute with the Mail, leading to the newspaper group's unsuccessful legal action that year. It was believed by their executives that Cainer's switch might lead to a loss of 4% of the Mail's circulation to the Express. After Richard Desmond became the proprietor of the Express titles, Cainer joined the Daily Mirror in March 2001. Promised a high-profile position on page 9 by Mirror editor Piers Morgan, Cainer's column was soon shifted to a more remote location in the paper. He returned to the Daily Mail in June 2004. Cainer's book, Cosmic Ordering, was published in 2006. He made frequent appearances as a pundit on British TV and radio stations, whenever astrology was in the news. At the Mail, he was the highest paid journalist in Great Britain.

He was also a regular guest on Jools' Annual Hootenanny giving his opinion on what might happen in the up-and-coming New Year.

From 1999 until 2014, Cainer owned 35 Stonegate in York, initially selling horoscopes from the shop. In 2004, he worked with Uri Geller to relaunch it as the Museum of Psychic Experience, but the venture was not a success. In 2007, he transformed the building into Haunted, a haunted house attraction, which closed in 2014.

Cainer had six children. In the 1990s his first wife was killed suddenly in a car crash leaving him alone to care for his young children. On 2 May 2016 he was found dead in his home office by his wife Sue, of a suspected heart attack. An inquest found that he had taken cocaine shortly before his death, the cardiotoxic effects of which may have contributed to his heart attack. An open verdict was returned. Following his death, his nephew Oscar Cainer, whom Jonathan trained as his successor, took over his newspaper column and astrology website.

== Notes ==
=== Other sources ===
- "You ask the questions" at The Independent
- Biography at "exploreastrology.co.uk"
- "The Observer Profile: Jonathan Cainer"
- "Star of the stargazers"
- "Jonathan Cainer: The big business of astrology"
