= John Partridge (astrologer) =

English astrologer

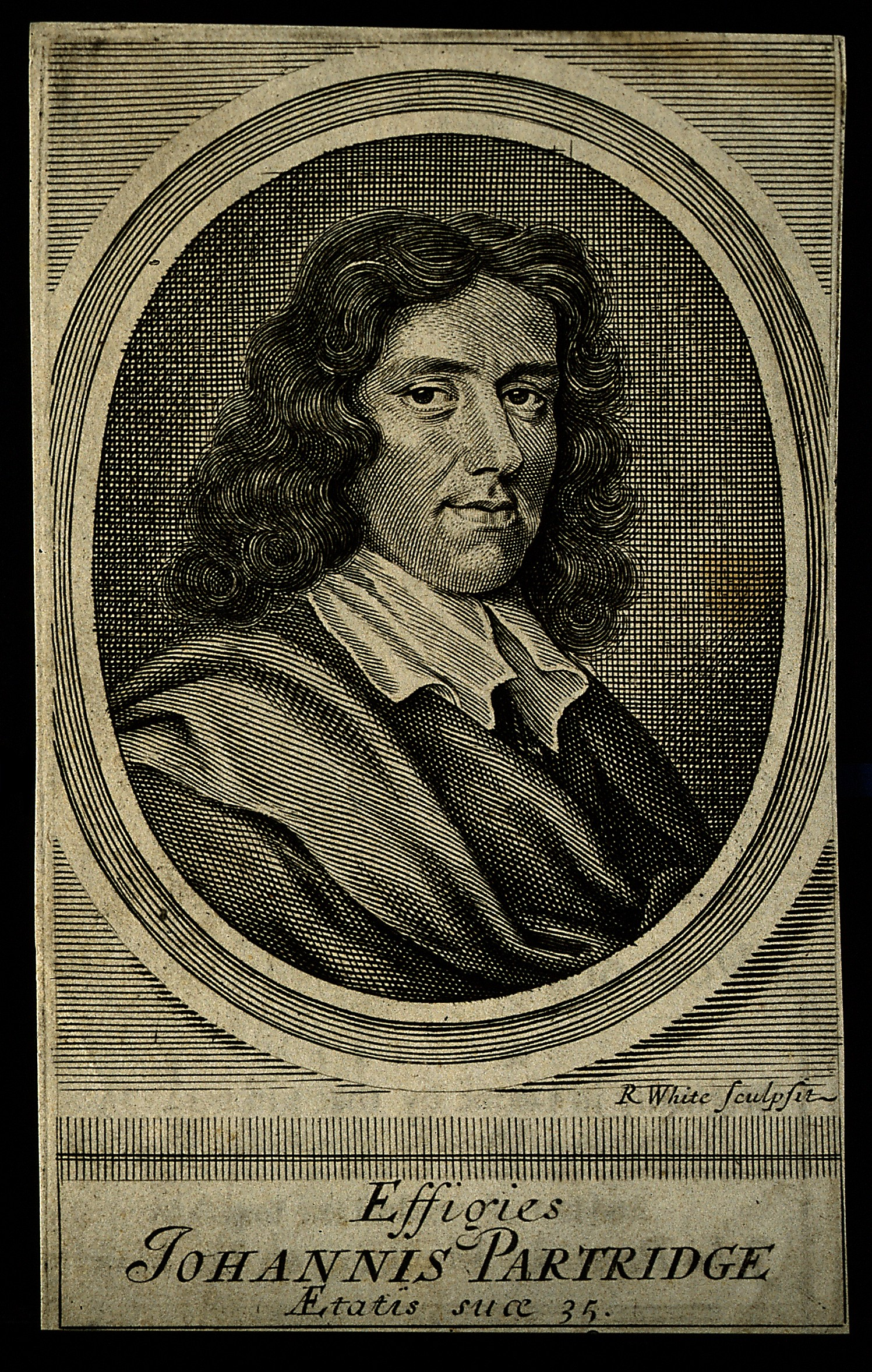
Engraving of John Partridge, 1682

John Partridge (1644 – c. 1714) was an English astrologer, the author and publisher of a number of astrological almanacs and books.

== Life ==
Partridge was born 18 January 1644 (OS) in East Sheen, Surrey, and died in either 1714 or 1715.

He was working as a shoemaker in Covent Garden around 1680. Partridge managed to teach himself enough Latin, Greek, Hebrew and astrology to enroll at Leyden University, Holland. He graduated in Medicine and by 1682 was styling himself "Physician to his Majesty". Although he was one of the sworn physicians of the court, he apparently never attended nor received any salary.

Partridge undertook to himself the task of reforming astrology. His program for reform involved eliminating the elements derived for the medieval Arabic tradition in favour of a return to Ptolemy.

Partridge was strongly identified with the Whig faction in seventeenth-century English politics. He was forced into exile in the Dutch Republic during the reign of James II. The reign was also marked by Partridge's feud with his former astrological mentor John Gadbury, who converted to Catholicism. This quarrel spread into a feud with George Parker.

== Swift hoax ==
In the 1708 edition of the Merlinus Almanac, Partridge sarcastically referred to the Church of England as the "infallible Church". This drew the attention of satirist and Church of Ireland cleric Jonathan Swift. Playing on Partridge's own (generally inaccurate) yearly predictions of deaths of notable individuals, Swift, writing under the pseudonym Isaac Bickerstaff, predicted in a letter published in January 1708 that Partridge himself would die an "infallible death" on 29 March that year. On that date, Swift published another letter (purportedly by a "man employed in the Revenue") confirming Partridge's death. The letter was reprinted by other writers and publishers along with its brilliant accompanying eulogy:

Here five foot deep lyes on his back
A cobbler, starmonger, and quack…
Who to the stars in pure good-will,
Does to his best look upward still.
Weep all you customers that use
His pills, his almanacks or shoes.

When Partridge published a letter proclaiming that he had not in fact died, Swift announced that his letter was false, as "no man alive ever writ such damned stuff as this." Partridge's intense unpopularity among Church supporters, those whose deaths he had falsely predicted, anti-Whigs, and those who felt his "astrology" was in reality quackery kept the hoax going long after Swift finally dispensed with it. Partridge reportedly suffered from the effects of the hoax for the rest of his life.

== Books ==
- Partridge's advice to the Protestants of England, 1678
- Mikropanastron, or, An astrological vade mecum briefly teaching the whole art of astrology, 1679. Facsimile reprint, 2005.

A textbook of traditional horary, electional and natal astrology. The book included several sets of aphorisms including the famous Centiloquium, the 100 sayings attributed to Ptolemy.

- Mercurius coelestis, being an almanack for the year of the world's redemption, 1682..., 1682
- Merlinus redivivus, being an almanack for the year of our redemption, 1684..., 1684
- Opus Reformatum: Treatise of Astrology in which The Common Errors of that Art are Modestly Exposed and Rejected, 1693. Reprinted, Kessinger Publishing, 2004. ISBN 0-7661-8471-4
