= Julia Parker (astrologer) =

Australian astrologer and author (born 1932)

- Born: 1932 (age 93–94); Plymouth, Devon
- Occupations: Astrologer and author

Julia Parker (née Lethbridge; born 1932, Plymouth, Devon) is an astrologer and author who, often in partnership with her husband Derek Parker, has written many popular and introductory books on astrology.

== Biography ==
The most notable of Parker's books is The Compleat Astrologer, first published in London in 1970, later released in seventeen countries, and selling over a million copies. This has remained in print for over 30 years. The Compleat Astrologer has become known as the archetypal 'coffee-table' book on astrology and the first key reference source for many well-known professional astrologers. A revised and expanded edition, retitled The New Compleat Astrologer, was published by Random House in 1990 and gained recognition for being "graphically stunning" and for its comprehensive treatment of astrology at a layman's level.

Julia Parker studied astrology at the Faculty of Astrological Studies in London. Later she became its secretary, and then its president for twelve years. She retains the role of patron. She has also acted as a trustee of the Urania Trust, a registered astrological charity.

Julia Parker has featured in many television programs and has written popular horoscope columns for Cosmopolitan, Company, Woman's Own and Good Housekeeping in the UK, and the Hong Kong Tatler. She resides in Sydney and describes herself as a designer and artist.

== Publications ==
Publications in collaboration with Derek Parker are marked with "+".

- The Compleat Astrologer (1971 +), Random House, ISBN 0-517-38711-5
- The Compleat Lover (1972, +), Mcgraw-Hill, ISBN 0070485003
- Derek and Julia Parker's Love Signs (1973 +), Mitchell Beazley, ISBN 0855330279
- The Compleat Astrologers' Love Signs (1974 +)
- The Immortals (1976 +)
- The Story and the Song: British musical comedy, (1979 +)
- How do you Know Who you Are? (1980 +)
- Do It Yourself Health (1982 +)
- A History of Astrology (1983 +) ISBN 0-233-97576-4
- The New Compleat Astrologer (1984 +) ISBN 0-85533-783-4
- Dreaming (1985 +)
- Life Signs (1986 +)
- A Traveller's Guide to Egypt + (1986)
- The Future Now (1988 +) (ISBN 0-85533-721-4 Mitchell Beazley
- A Traveller's Guide to Cyprus (1989 +)
- A World Atlas of the Supernatural (1990 +)
- The Secret World of your Dreams (1990 +)
- Parkers' Astrology (1991, 2009 +) ISBN 978-1-4053-4511-8
- The Power of Magic (1992 +)
- The Sun and Moon Signs Library (1992 +)
- Face Facts (1993 +)
- The Complete Book of Dreams (1995 +)
- Hearts of Fire (fiction,1995)
- The Stars Shine Bright (fiction, 1995)
- Love Signs (1996 +)
- Sun & Moon Signs, (1996 +), Dorling Kindersley (London), ISBN 0-7513-0396-8
- Parkers' Astrology Pack (1997 +)
- Parkers' Prediction Pack (1998 +)
- The KISS Guide to Astrology (2000 +) ISBN 0-7894-6044-0
- Astrology (2007 +), Dorling Kindersley (London)
- The Companion Guide to Astrology (2008 +) ISBN 978-1-4053-2198-3
- Parkers' Encyclopedia of Astrology (2010 +), Watkins Publishing (London) ISBN 1-905857-85-3
- Building Sydney's History (2011 +), Arcadia Publishing (Mount Pleasant, SC), ISBN 0-7385-4930-4
