= Robert Hand =

American astrologer and writer

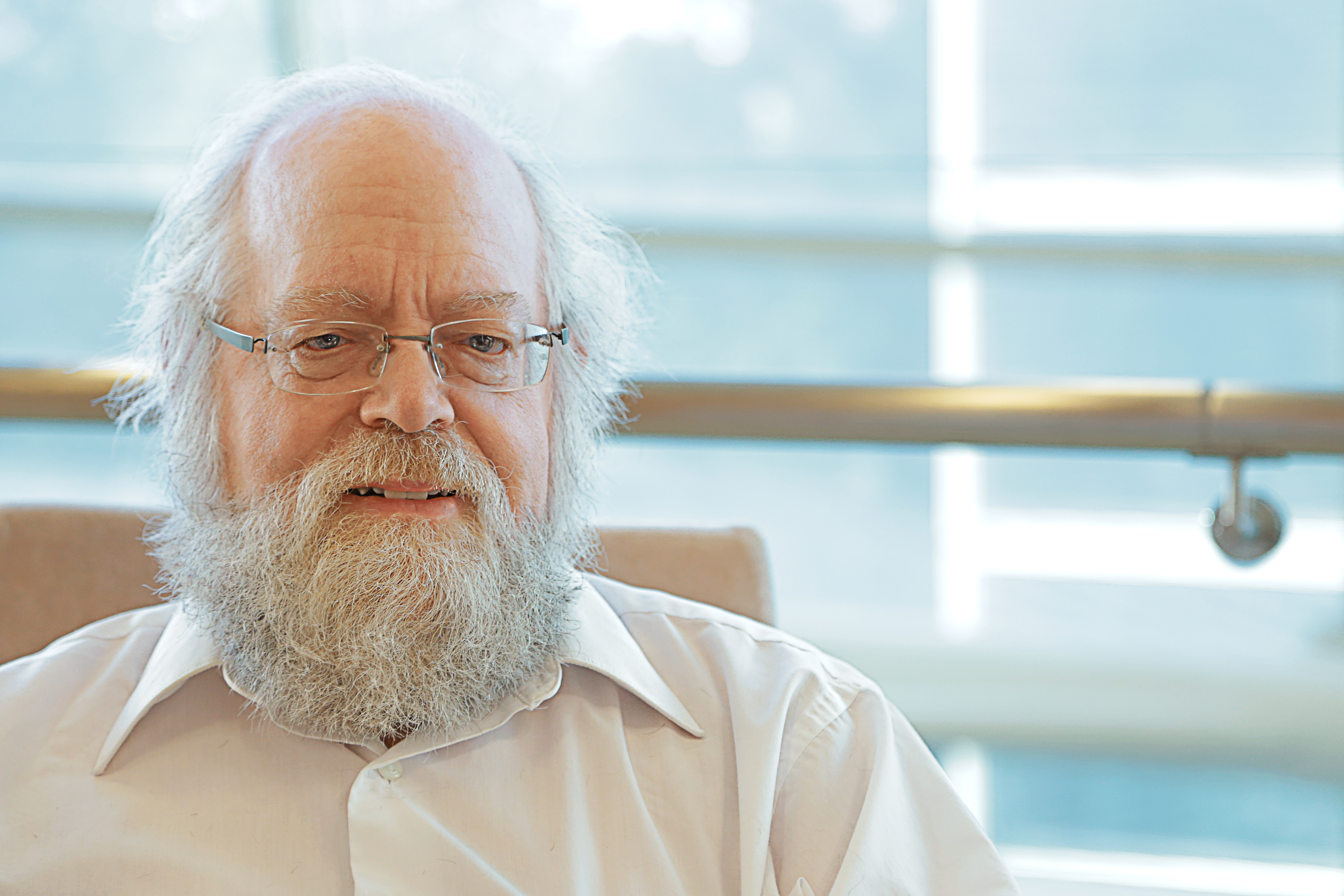
- Hand in 2014
- Born: Robert Sterling Hand; Plainfield, New Jersey
- Education: The Catholic University of America, Brandeis University
- Known for: Astrology, astrology-related computer programs
- Scientific career
- Fields: Astrology, history, philosophy, Medieval history, Latin
- Website: www.arhatmedia.com

Robert Sterling Hand (born December 5, 1942) is an American astrologer, historian, and writer.

== Early life ==
Robert Hand was born in Plainfield, New Jersey, and grew up in Orleans, Massachusetts. He began studying astrology at the age of 17. His father, Wilfred Hand, was a specialist in cosmobiology and heliocentric astrology, and used astrological charts to forecast changes in the stock market, and taught his son the basics of casting astrological charts. Hand went to Brandeis University, where he earned a B.A. in Intellectual History in 1965. He then went on to Princeton University and left before receiving a degree to pursue astrology as a full-time profession in 1972.

== Career ==
Early in his career, Hand wrote books on astrology and started a company that developed computer programs for astrologers. He began writing programs for microcomputers in 1977 with a desire to bring the benefits of fast and accurate calculations to the practice of astrology. Out of this effort, he founded Astro-Graphics Services in 1980 which later become Astrolabe, Inc.

Hand founded Arhat Media in 1997. Arhat, which is an acronym for "Archive for the Retrieval of Historical Astrological Texts", procures, protects and publishes translations of historical astrological works and secondary source material for serious astrologers and scholars. Some of this material has been integrated into the Robert Hand Library, which now houses the original texts and translations of most of the ancient and medieval astrologers, as well as the history of science, philosophy and mystical Judaism.

Hand gives chart readings and consultations in Reston, Virginia, and Las Vegas, Nevada.

== Works ==
=== Books ===
- Planets in Composite: Analyzing Human Relationships. Para Research. 1975. ISBN 978-0-914918-02-8.
- Planets in Transit: Life Cycles for Living. Whitford Press. 1976. ISBN 978-0-914918-24-0.
- Planets in Youth: Patterns of Early Development. Para Research. 1977. ISBN 978-0-914918-26-4.
- Horoscope Symbols. Para Research. 1981. ISBN 978-0-914918-16-5.
- Essays on Astrology. Schiffer Publishing. 1982. ISBN 978-0-914918-42-4.

Contributions

- Hand, Robert (2011). Foreword. Saturn: A New Look at an Old Devil. By Liz Greene. Red Wheel Weiser. ISBN 978-1578635078.

=== Interviews and lectures ===
- Hand, Robert (2005). "Towards a Post-Modern Astrology". Astro.com. Transcript of a talk Hand presented at the Astrological Conference 2005 of the British Astrological Association in York, UK.
- Phillipson, Garry (n.d.). "An Interview with Robert Hand". Skyscript.co.uk.
