= William Andrews (astrologer) =

English astrologer and writer

William Andrews (d. circa. 1713) was an astrologer, known mostly from his almanac. He published the Astrological Physician (1656), to which William Lilly contributed a preface. Among the Ashmolean Museum's manuscripts, there is preserved a letter, dated from Ashdown, Essex, 31 March 1656, in which Andrews thanks Lilly for writing the preface. In 1672 he published Annus Prodigiosus, or the Wonderful Year 1672, and More News from Heaven unto the World, or the Latter Part of the Wonderful Year 1672; being a further Account of the Portents and Signification of the Stars touching the United Netherlands. His almanac first appeared in 1655 as The Caelestiall Observator and appeared under various titles until 1672, when it appeared as News from the Stars, the title it would bear for the remainder of its run. He lived at Radwinter in Essex from 1668. The date of his death is unknown, but his will was proved in Radwinter in 1713.
