= Pellitus =

7th-century astrologer

Pellitus was a Spanish astrologer of the seventh century, who worked for Edwin of Northumbria, in the account given by Geoffrey of Monmouth.

Pellitus was engaged for Edwin's struggle against Cadwallon ap Cadfan. After Pellitus was assassinated by Brian, nephew of Cadwallon, military matters went much worse for Edwin, who was killed at the Battle of Heathfield, in 633.
