= John Goad =

John Goad (1616-1689) was head-master of Merchant Taylors' School in London.

== Life ==
Goad was the son of John Goad of Bishopsgate Street, London, and was born in St. Helen's parish there on 15 February 1616. After a preliminary training in Merchant Taylors' School he was admitted to St John's College, Oxford, in 1632, where he became a Fellow (B.A. 1636, M.A. 1640, B.D. 1647). In 1643 he was presented by his college to the vicarage of St Giles' Church, Oxford, and during the siege of Oxford performed divine service under fire of the parliamentary cannon. On 23 June 1646 he was presented by the university to the vicarage of Yarnton, Oxfordshire, which he held, with some trouble, until the Restoration of 1660. Anthony Wood's brother Christopher went daily to school with Goad in 1649, and Wood himself received instruction from him.

In 1660 he accepted the head-mastership of Tonbridge School in Kent, but was appointed head-master of Merchant Taylors' School on 12 July 1661. He was very successful in this position until the agitation at the time of the alleged Popish Plot. He was charged in March 1681 with certain passages that 'savoured strongly of popery' in a 'Comment on the Church of England Catechism,' written for the use of his scholars. The grand jury of London presented a complaint to the Merchant Taylors' Company respecting the religious doctrines taught in their school. His principal opponent was John Owen, who succeeded in obtaining Goad's place for his nephew, John Hartcliffe. After hearing Goad's defence the company decided on 13 April 1681 that he was 'popishly and erroneously affected.' He was dismissed, but in recognition of his past services they voted him a gratuity. Goad's friends protested against his dismissal as the work of a factious party.

He now took a house in Piccadilly, and opened a private school with many of his previous pupils. This school he continued until shortly before his death. In the beginning of 1686 he openly declared himself a Roman Catholic; Wood stated that he had been reconciled to the Roman communion in December 1660 in Somerset House by a priest in the household of Queen Henrietta Maria. Joseph Gillow argued that the sermons which he published after this date are inconsistent with this story (Dictionary of English Catholics, ii. 501).

Goad died on 28 October 1689, and was buried near the graves of his relations in the church of Great St. Helen's, Bishopsgate Street.

== Works ==
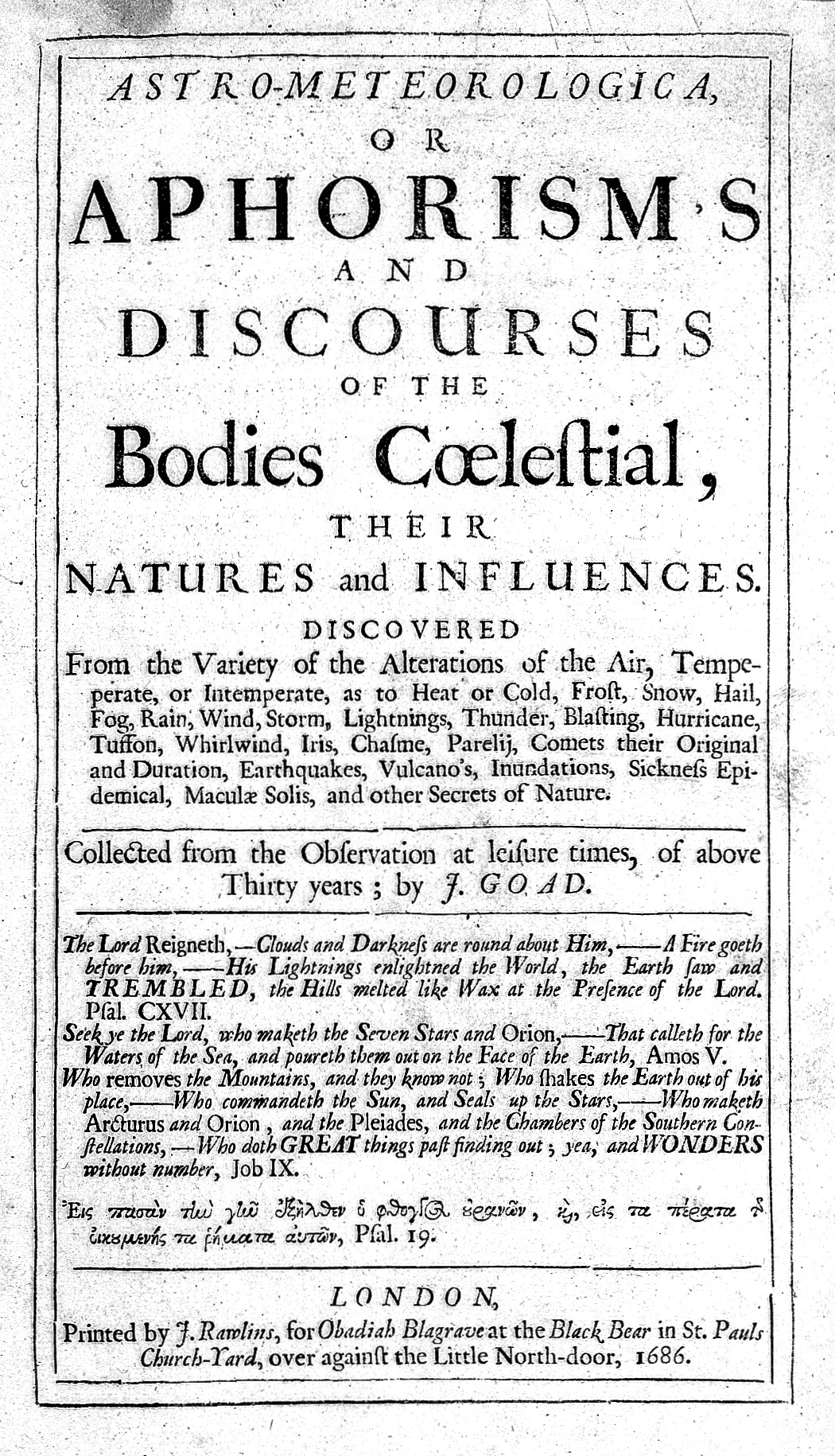
Astro-Meteorologia, 1686. A discourse on astrometeorology

His works are:

- Printed sermons, some of which were preached at St. Paul's.
- 'A Treatise concerning Plagues, their Natures, Numbers, Kinds, &c.,' which was destroyed in the press during the Great Fire of London in 1666.
- 'Genealogicon Latinum. A previous Method of Dictionary of all Latin Words … &c., for the use of the Neophyte in Merchant Taylors' School,' 2nd edition, London, 1676.
- 'Comment on the Church of England Catechism.'
- 'Declamation, whether Monarchy be the best form of Government.' Printed at the end of 'The English Orator or Rhetorical Descants by way of Declamation,' by William Richards of Trinity College, Oxford; London, 1680.
- 'Astro-Meteorologia: or Aphorisms and Discourses of the Bodies Cœlestial, their Natures and Influences, Discovered from the Variety of the Alterations of the Air, temperate or intemperate, as to Heat or Cold, Frost, Snow, Hail, Fog, Rain, Wind, Storm, Lightnings, Thunder, Blasting, Hurricane, &c. Collected from the Observation … of thirty years,' London, 1686. This work gained him great reputation. The subject of it is a kind of astrology, founded for the most part on sacred authority, reason, and experiment.
- 'Diary of the Weather at London from July 1, 1677, to the last of October 1679,' Bodl. Libr. Ashmol. MS. 367.
- 'Astro-Meteorologia sana; sive Principia Physico-Mathematica, quibus Mutationum Aeris, Morborum Epidemicorum, Cometarum, Terræ Motuum, aliorumque insigniorum Naturæ Effectuum Ratio reddi possit. Opus multorum annorum experientia comprobatum,' London, 1690. Anonymously edited after Goad's death by Edward Waple, archdeacon of Taunton and vicar of St. Sepulchre's, London; with portrait of the author, engraved by R. White, prefixed.
- 'Autodidactica: or a Practical Vocabulary, being the best and easiest Method yet extant for young Beginners to attain to the Knowledge of the Latin Tongue,' London, 1690.

== See also ==
- Heliocentric astrology
