= Richard James Morrison =

British astrologer

Richard James Morrison (15 June 1795 – 5 April 1874) was an English astrologer, commonly known by his pen name Zadkiel and best known for the series called Zadkiel's Almanac.

== Early life ==
The son of Richard Caleb Morrison, Morrison joined the Royal Navy in 1806 serving as a first-class volunteer until 1810, as a master's mate until 1815, and resigned due to ill-health with the rank of lieutenant in 1829. He then devoted himself to the study of astrology, which he termed as astro-meteorology. He became a member of the Council of the Meteorological Society in 1840.

== Career ==
In 1831, Morrison issued The Herald of Astrology, which was subsequently known as Zadkiel's Almanac. In this annual pamphlet, he published predictions of the chief events of the coming year. Morrison wrote under the signature Zadkiel Tao-Sze. Morrison wrote articles such as The New Principia, or true system of astronomy, in which the Earth is proved to be the stationary centre of the Solar System (1868), which made him a charlatan in the eyes of scientists. In 1863, he won a libel suite against Admiral Sir Edward Belcher, who wrote in the Daily Telegraph that Morrison was "the crystal globe seer who gulled many of our nobility about the year 1852". He was awarded twenty shillings (one pound) damages, but was deprived of his costs. The Athenaeum (16 May 1874, p. 666) noted that Morrison was “the restorer and Grand Master in this country of Tao-Sze, a secret society intended to be of immense power, and to outshine the Free- masons, but which, most probably, by his death, is reduced to two members, and inanition”.

== Books ==
His works include:

- Handbook of Astrology
- Introduction to Astrology (1835) – a re-edition of William Lilly's Christian Astrology.
- The Horoscope
- The Grammar of Astrology
- Astronomy in a Nutshell.
