= Guido Bonatti =

13th-century Italian astrologer and astronomer

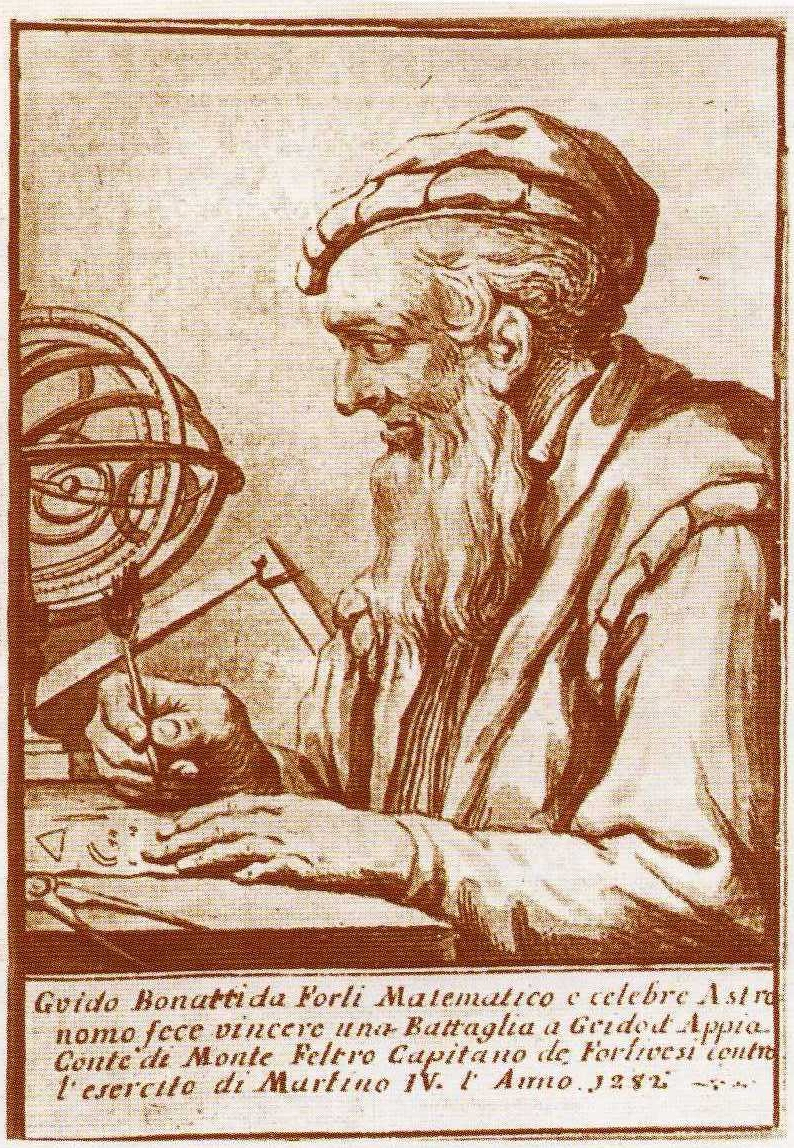
Guido Bonatti, anonymous 18th-century engraving.

Guido Bonatti (died between 1296 and 1300) was an Italian mathematician, astronomer and astrologer, who was the most celebrated astrologer of the 13th century. Bonatti was advisor of Frederick II, Holy Roman Emperor, Ezzelino da Romano III, Guido Novello da Polenta and Guido I da Montefeltro. He also served the communal governments of Florence, Siena and Forlì. His employers were all Ghibellines (supporters of the Holy Roman Emperor), who were in conflict with the Guelphs (supporters of the Pope), and all were excommunicated at some time or another. Bonatti's astrological reputation was also criticised in Dante's Divine Comedy, where he is depicted as residing in hell as punishment for his astrology.

His most famous work was his Liber Astronomiae or 'Book of Astronomy', written around 1277. This remained a classic astrology textbook for two centuries.

== Biography ==
Bonatti's dates of birth and death are unknown, the latter probably occurring between 1296 and 1300. In 1233, he is known as the winner of a dispute in Bologna with the friar Giovanni Schio from Vicenza, who maintained the non-scientific basis of astrology.

He is probably the first astrologer to have used the midpoints in astrology. He used it to refine the timing for the military campaigns for the Count of Montefeltro Bonati announced to the count that he would repulse the enemy but would be wounded in the fray. The event transpired as Bonati had predicted, and the count, who had taken with him the necessary materials to staunch his wound in case the prophecy came true, became a devout adherent of astrology.

There is a tradition that Bonatti, towards the end of his life, took the friar's habit of the Franciscan Order. This has been contested, as Bonatti expressed great disdain for Franciscans in his early period. However, the Franciscan Order, in the 1924 inaugural issue of its annual publication, Franciscan Studies, lays claim to Fra Guido Bonatti:

The celebrated physicist, astronomer and astrologer, Guido Bonatti (d. 1296), a Friar Minor, drew scholars to his professional chair from all parts of Europe. He wrote Theoria Planetarum (printed at Venice, 1506) and Liber Astronomicus.

According to the uncorroborated account of the Italian historian Ludovico Antonio Muratori, Bonatti was murdered by robbers whilst returning from a study trip to Paris and other Italian cities, being set upon in or near Casena, with his body left upon the road. Evidence from various accounts establishes that Bonatti was in his eighties when he died.
