= Derek Parker =

British writer and broadcaster (1932–2025)

Derek Parker (27 May 1932 – 2 January 2025) was a British writer and broadcaster. He was the author of numerous works on literature, ballet, and opera, and with his wife Julia of several books about astrology.

== Biography ==
Parker was born in Looe, Cornwall on 27 May 1932. He was educated at Fowey Grammar School (1941–49). Parker worked as reporter with The Cornishman (Penzance) (1949–55) then as drama critic with The Western Morning News (Plymouth) (1956–58). In 1958 he worked as an interviewer and announcer at TWW Cardiff, and subsequently for forty years as a freelance radio broadcaster, compiling and introducing many programmes both for domestic radio and for the BBC World Service. He was editor of The Poetry Review (1966–70) and of The Author (1984-2002). He was a Fellow of the Society of Authors.

In 2003, Parker and his wife moved to Sydney, before returning to the United Kingdom in 2022. He died from a short illness on 2 January 2025, at the age of 92.

== Hoax ==
In the early 1980s, "William Blatchford" claimed to have located the Memoirs of Cora Pearl, which he said had been published in 1890, after Pearl's death. Supposedly an earlier version of the book published in 1886, this volume purported to date back to an earlier date, perhaps even as early 1873. Decidedly more frank and sexually explicit than the 1886 memoirs, their idiomatic English – expressive of a provincial, unsophisticated use of the language – convinced many of the work's authenticity when the memoirs were published by Granada under the title Grand Horizontal, The Erotic Memoirs of a Passionate Life. However, Blatchford turned out to be a pseudonym adopted by the real author of the 'memoirs', Derek Parker, a former chairman of the Society of Authors, who later admitted that he had hoaxed Granada.

== Publications ==
=== As sole author ===
- The Fall of Phaethon (1954)
- Beyond Wisdom (verse play, 1957)
- Byron and his World (1968)
- The Twelfth Rose (ballet libretto, 1969)
- The Question of Astrology (1970)
- The Westcountry (1973)
- John Donne and his World (1975)
- Familiar to All: William Lilly and 17th century astrology (1975)
- Radio: the great years (1977)
- The Westcountry and the Sea (1980)
- Pearl, Cora (1983), Blatchford, William (ed.), Grand Horizontal: The Erotic Memoirs of a Passionate Lady, Stein and Day, ISBN 9780812829174 (fiction, as William Blatchford)
- The Eros Series of 15 erotic novels, published anonymously (1988–94)
- God of the Dance: Vaslav Nijinsky (1988)
- The Trade of Angels (1988, fiction)
- The Royal Academy of Dancing: the first 75 years (1995)
- Writing Erotic Fiction (1995)
- Nell Gwyn (2000)
- Roman Murder Mystery: the true story of Pompilia (2001)
- Casanova (2002)
- Cellini (2004)
- Voltaire (2005)
- The Trampled Wife: the scandalous life of Mary Eleanor Bowes (2006)
- Outback: the discovery of Australia's interior (2007)
- Banjo Paterson: the man who wrote Waltzing Matilda (2009)
- Arthur Phillip: Australia's first Governor (2010)
- Governor Macquarie: his life, times and revolutionary vision for Australia (2010)

=== As joint author ===
In collaboration with Paul Casimir

- Company of Two (1955)

In collaboration with Julia Parker

- The Compleat Astrologer (1971)
- The Compleat Lover (1972)
- Derek and Julia Parker's Love Signs (1973)
- The Compleat Astrologers' Love Signs (1974)
- The Immortals (1976)
- The Story and the Song: British musical comedy, (1979)
- How do you Know Who you Are? (1980)
- Do It Yourself Health (1982)
- A History of Astrology (1983)
- The New Compleat Astrologer (1984)
- Dreaming (1985)
- Life Signs (1986)
- A Traveller's Guide to Egypt (1986)
- The Future Now (1988)
- A Traveller's Guide to Cyprus (1989)
- A World Atlas of the Supernatural (1990)
- The Secret World of your Dreams (1990)
- Parkers' Astrology (1991)
- The Power of Magic (1992)
- The Sun and Moon Signs Library (1992)
- Face Facts (1993)
- The Complete Book of Dreams (1995)
- Love Signs (1996)
- Parkers' Astrology Pack (1997)
- Parkers' Prediction Pack (1998)
- The KISS Guide to Astrology (2000)
- The Companion Guide to Astrology (2008)
- Parkers' Encyclopedia of Astrology (2010)
- Building Sydney's History (2011)

=== As editor ===
- Poetry Review (1966–70)
- Selected Letters of Edith Sitwell (1970, with John Lehmann)
- The Author (1974–2002)
- Sacheverell Sitwell: a symposium (1975)
- An Anthology of Erotic Verse (1980)
- An Anthology of Erotic Prose (1981)
- Love Confessed (1983)
- The Kings of England (1995)
