= Mulugu Ramalingeswara Varaprasad Siddhanti =

Indian astrologer (1957–2022)

- Born: 1957; Guntur
- Died: 23 January 2022; Hyderabad
- Occupation: Astrologer
- Notable work: Subhatithi Panchangam Subhatithi Calendar
- Honours: Sri Kalahastiswara Asthana Jyotisha Pandita Jyotisha Brahma Jyotisha Vignana Vidya Visarada

Mulugu Ramalingeswara Varaprasad Siddhanti (1957 – 23 January 2022), also known as Mulugu Siddhanti, was an astrologer from Hyderabad, India. He was known for narrating weekly horoscopes, astrology, and panchangam on various Telugu language TV channels in Telangana and Andhra Pradesh, India.

== Life and work ==
He was born in 1957 in Guntur. His grandfather Mulugu Naga Lingaiah, who was an astrologer himself, is said to have established “Shaiva Peetham” in Guntur in 1889 which was later managed by Mulugu’s father, Mulugu Viswanatham. After Mulugu Siddhanti's death, his only daughter Smt. Mulugu Sivajyothi took on the reins of the management of Peetham.

Mulugu's astrology on TV was widely viewed by Telugu speakers across the world. Because of his successful zodiac-based predictions, he had a good following in politics, business and the film industry.

Vellampalli Srinivas, Endowments Minister said: "Through the astrology of noted astrologer Mulugu Ramalingeswara Varaprasad many people have prospered." L V Subramanyam, Ex-Andhra Pradesh Chief Secretary, said that with vast astrological knowledge, Mulugu Siddhanti was working for the benefit of the community. Mulugu was honored with the title Jyothishya Sastra Vignana Visarada.

== Death ==
Mulugu died on 23 January 2022. The Chief Minister of Andhra Pradesh, Y S Jagan Mohan Reddy, expressed condolences regarding his death.

== Books ==
Books written by him include the following:

- Angara Kudu
- Rahu Kethu Samstha Prabhavalu
- Sarpa Grahalu
