= William Parron =

Italian astrologer

William Parron (b. c. 1460, fl. 1500) was an Italian astrologer, who worked for Henry VII of England from 1498 to 1503. An author of almanacs and prognostications, he produced the De astrorum vi fatali in 1499 as a private printed prediction for Henry. He also engaged in investigative work on the background of Perkin Warbeck.

His publishers were Wynkyn de Worde and Richard Pynson, and the almanac is said to be the first printed in English. The almanac for the year 1500 survives to this day. However, Parron's prediction that Henry's queen would live to age 80 backfired, as she died young. Parron subsequently left the court.
