= Margaret Hone =

Margaret Ethelwyn Hone (2 October 1892 – 14 October 1969) was an influential mid–20th century astrologer and astrological author. She is known for reviving the Equal House system in her popular courses of instruction. She was also known as "Peg Hone".

She was born at Studley, Warwickshire, England.

Margaret Hone's best known book was "The Modern Text Book of Astrology" which was adopted as the official textbook for the FAS (Faculty of Astrological Studies) of the United Kingdom for many years. Charles Carter, who wrote the preface to the book, expressed sentiment that Hone's work was a step forward in the teaching of astrology.

She co-founded (with Charles Carter and others) the "Faculty of Astrological Studies". Carter became the first principal, Margaret Hone the second. She also helped to found the UK Astrological Association in 1958.

Under her 15-year tenure as Principal, the Faculty of Astrological Studies became financially profitable and gained worldwide recognition.

Her contributions to astrological education extended far beyond the Faculty's own students. She was eulogized by colleague Roy Allin as the "Mother" of modern astrology, a title complementing Alan Leo's status as its "Father". To honor her legacy, the Margaret Hone Award was established to recognize the best candidate in the Diploma Interpretation Examination.

== Books ==
- Hone, Margaret: "Applied Astrology"
- Hone, Margaret: "The Modern Text Book of Astrology"
