= Roy C. Firebrace =

British astrologer

Roy Charles Whitworth George Firebrace
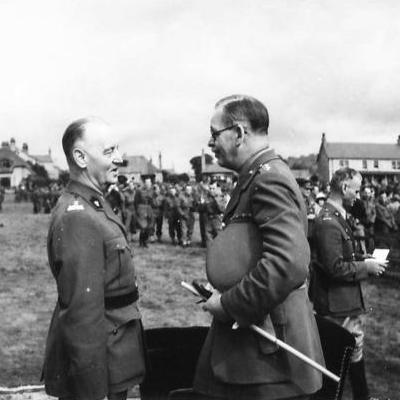
- Colonel Firebrace (right) with General Władysław Sikorski in 1940.
- Born: 16 August 1889; Halifax, Nova Scotia
- Died: 10 November 1974 (aged 85)
- Military career
- Allegiance: United Kingdom
- Branch: British Army
- Rank: Brigadier

Brigadier Roy Charles Whitworth George Firebrace (16 August 1889 – 10 November 1974) was a British Army officer, who served as head of the British Military Mission in Moscow during the Second World War. He was also a sidereal astrologer, founder and editor of the journal Spica, and a co-founder of the Astrological Association of Great Britain.

== Early life ==
According to data reported by him in Spica (January 1973), Firebrace was born on 16 August 1889 at 5:00 p.m. AST, in Halifax, Nova Scotia, where his English father had an army post. He was second son of Lieutenant-Colonel George Firebrace, of the Royal Artillery, of a branch of the family from which also came the Firebrace baronets, and Agnes Adela, daughter of Henry Aylmer Porter, of Cranborne Court, Windsor Forest, Berkshire. His elder brother was Aylmer Firebrace.

== Military career ==
Firebrace was commissioned into the Royal Artillery in 1908. He was promoted lieutenant-colonel in 1936, colonel in 1937, and retired as a brigadier in 1946. He was the British military attaché in Riga before the beginning of the Second World War and later in Moscow until 1940 as Head of the British Military Mission in Moscow. He acted as an observer and interpreter for Winston Churchill at the Potsdam and Yalta conferences and when Molotov visited London in 1942 and ran the War Office Russian Liaison Group.

Nikolai Tolstoy recounts some of Firebrace's military views and experiences in his 1977 book, Victims of Yalta. Firebrace is also mentioned in Nicholas Bethell's 1974 book, The Last Secret.

During his service in military intelligence, Firebrace was involved (in 1944) in the affair surrounding the arrest and prosecution of Helen Duncan, a famous British spiritualist medium, under the Witchcraft Act 1735 (9 Geo. 2. c. 5) (repealed by a private member's bill in 1951).

== Astrology ==
The Brigadier became interested in astrology relatively early in life but it was not until after the war that he became really active in astrological circles. At first his interest extended to psychic studies and for many years he was president of the College of Psychic Studies in London.

A big-framed man, known affectionately as "the Brig", Firebrace worked closely with the eminent siderealist Cyril Fagan (1896–1970) and gained a lifelong interest in sidereal astrology.

Firebrace co-founded the Astrological Association of Great Britain with John Addey in 1958 and was its first president. His enthusiasm for sidereal astrology was resisted by other members; in March 1961 he resigned to found Spica, the quarterly journal he published until October 1974. This publication was a major driving force behind the western siderealist movement in the second half of the 20th century.

== Works ==
Firebrace wrote a series of books called the "Astrology Moray series" and contributed to American Astrology magazine.

Astrology Moray series

- Primer of Sidereal Astrology. Astrology Moray series. Vol. 1.
- Wars in the Sidereal. Astrology Moray series. Vol. 2. 1959.
- New Directions in Astrology. Astrology Moray series. Vol. 3. 1959.
- Tertiary Directions. Astrology Moray series. Vol. 4. 1960.

Current editions

- Fagan, Cyril; Firebrace, Brigadier R. C. (2008). Primer of Sidereal Astrology. American Federation of Astrologers. ISBN 978-0866904278.

== Personal life ==
In 1916, Firebrace married Esme, eldest daughter of Henry Claud Lyall, of The Hurst, Headley, Surrey, of a landed gentry family. They had a son, Anthony, and a daughter, linguist Margaret Anne ("Margot"), who respectively married a daughter and a son (Richard John Boileau Walker, curator of the Government Art Collection), of Commander Kenneth Ralph Walker, RN, of Scotnish, Lochgilphead, Argyllshire and the Dower House, Crawley, Hampshire.
