= Klingsor =

Klingsor (also Klinschor) is a magician in the Middle High German epic poem Parzival (c. 1200).

Named for Klingsor:

- Klingsohr, character in Heinrich von Ofterdingen by Novalis (1802)
- Klingsor, magician in Richard Wagner's opera Parsifal (1882)
- Tristan Klingsor, pen name (c. 1895) of French poet Léon Leclère (1874—1966)
- Klingsor, painter and protagonist of Klingsor's Last Summer by Hermann Hesse (1919), again mentioned in Die Morgenlandfahrt (1932)
- Klingsor by Friedrich Schnack (1922)
- character in Der Graf von Saint-Germain by Alexander Lernet-Holenia (1948)
- 9511 Klingsor, a Main-belt Asteroid (1977)
- Herr Klingsor by Otfried Preußler (1987)
- Klingsor, code name of a Nazi scientist in Jorge Volpi's novel "In Search of Klingsor" (En busca de Klingsor, 1999)
