= John Addey (astrologer) =

English astrologer (1920–1982)

John Michael Addey (15 June 1920 – 27 March 1982) was an English astrologer.

== Biography ==
John Addey was born in Barnsley, Yorkshire in the UK on 15 June 1920 at 8.15 am and died at the Royal Homeopathic Hospital, London at 5.17 pm on 27 March 1982.

He attended Ackworth School (in Pontefract, Yorkshire): Ackworth was a Quaker School, although the Addey family were not Quakers themselves, and Addey was much influenced by the spirit of Quakerism – he was a conscientious objector during the second world war – and was later to marry a Quaker. During his time at Ackworth he showed some talent for poetry, but more so for sports: he was captain of most of the various sports teams organised by the school. He was head boy before leaving in 1939 and going on to Cambridge where he read English literature.

He left university and joined the Friends Ambulance Unit. While working there, he was struck down by severe Ankylosing Spondylitis, and was unable to walk without the aid of a stick for the rest of his life. Initial treatment required an 18-month stay in hospital, and it was during this enforced period of immobility that his energies turned inwards towards the two areas of study which were to occupy him for the rest of his life: philosophy and astrology (he had been interested in both from his mid-teens). He studied with the Faculty of Astrological Studies and was awarded his Diploma in the early 1950s.

He rapidly came under the influence of Charles E O Carter, who guided Addey's explorations in both philosophy and astrology. In philosophy this meant an acknowledgement of the worth of all the great world religions and philosophies, but an especial interest in the Platonic tradition; in astrology Carter (who was for some time the President of the Astrological Lodge of the Theosophical Society) encouraged Addey's mystical leanings. Central to Addey's later work on the Harmonic theory of astrology was the conviction that the mystical and the scientific were not mutually exclusive and that neither was complete without the other.

After leaving the Amubulance Unit (where he had met Betty Poole, whom he married in 1946), Addey worked for a time as a private tutor in Wiltshire before taking up a teaching post at Queen Mary's Hospital for Children, where for many years he taught young polio patients who often were hospitalised for long periods.

John Addey had three children, Etain Addey (author, A Silent Joy), Tim Addey (author, The Seven Myths of the Soul, the Unfolding Wings – the Way of Perfection in the Platonic Tradition, and Beyond the Shadows – the Metaphysics of the Platonic Tradition) and Jane Addey (who is a long time Waldorf handwork teacher).

== Astrological work ==
According to Addey, astrology was not considered a scientific discipline because of the prejudices of orthodoxy, and a disinclination of astrologers to use the empiric and rational tools being refined by post-enlightenment scientists of all kinds. For this reason, Addey helped found the Astrological Association of Great Britain in 1958. He was the Association's first Secretary, and, on the resignation of its President Brigadier Roy Firebrace in 1961, became its second President, holding the office until 1973, at which point he became the Association's Patron. He edited the organisation's magazine, The Astrological Journal from 1962 to 1972, and was the prime mover in establishing the Association's annual conferences. He founded the Urania Trust as a registered education charity in 1970.

=== Theory of "Harmonics" ===
Addey's most important contribution to modern astrology was the Harmonic theory, which sought to put the understanding of astrological effects on a clear and rational footing. Starting from the great Platonic statement (Timaeus, 37d) that "Time is an image of eternity flowing according to number", Addey identified astrology as "the study of effects in the world of flux and change" in a 1958 article, 'The Search for a Scientific Starting Point'; and later articulated the fundamental law – "all astrological effects can be understood in terms of the harmonics of cosmic periods". In other words, the temporal world is only truly understood when it is seen as making manifest the great eternal ideas – Platonic Forms – in ordered cosmic periods.

Reception of Addey's theory of Harmonics

James Holden, in his History of Horoscopic Astrology, writes that Addey's theory of Harmonics "excited some enthusiasm when it was first announced, but it has not found favor with most astrologers", adding however that most horoscope programs can calculate harmonics if desired.

Astrology Critics, reviewing Addey's Harmonics in Astrology (1976), writes that the book starts from the fact that even basic issues such as "which is the best system (Eastern or Western) in astrology, what is the correct house system, where is the cusp of a house, the delineations in 'good' and 'bad' aspects or 'good" and 'bad' signs." The review suggests that harmonics could throw a new light on such questions, but concludes that "what John Addey wrote is only the seed. The theory of harmonics in astrology needs more research and development in order to see how can be better applied in practice. Unfortunately it didn't made much progress since 1976".

=== Critique of traditional astrology ===
Addey's view was that constructs such as the twelvefold zodiac and house systems were unable to evaluate many of the effects of cosmic periods. Twelvefold systems allow patterns of 2, 3, 4, 6 and 12 to be easily analyzed, but not cycles of 5, 7, 8, 9, 10, ll or greater than 12. The tools of astrology would have to be improved. He wrote, "We are all engaged upon the building of a science – a science which of course has practical application as an art. But what are the 'stones' with which this Science is to be built? This is an important question, for before any science can be truly unfolded, so as to realize its full potentialities, it must first be reduced to its fundamental concepts".

These fundamental concepts, he thought, were at their simplest the qualities of number manifesting in time. The search for some way of understanding these lead to the formulation of his theory of harmonics. His harmonic techniques presented a far more subtle and refined way of studying the complex pattern of the numerous cycles that make up the world in which we live. It broke out of the limitations of the twelvefold system of astrology.

The practical development of harmonics was facilitated by Addey's use of computers. Nevertheless, the initial vision of a basis for a rational astrology arose from a vantage point of Platonic and Pythagorean contemplation. For Addey, the value of astrology was as a way of seeing the great order of time as expressive of eternal forms and numbers. The value of the natal chart was that it was, in his words, "a diagram of the soul's contract with time and space"[9]. He was influenced by Plato's myth of Er described in The Republic, in which Plato suggests that the soul continually incarnates having made a positive choice to take on the opportunities and challenges of a particular terrestrial life, lived at a particular time, in a particular place.

== Cited research ==
Addey's astrological research methods have been cited in mainstream publications. One source cites Addey's work on astrological time twins (people who are born at the same moment and should therefore have similar traits) as "perhaps the most extensive survey of time twins made by an astrologer." The authors describe their own independent study that considered Addey's criteria of timing between time twins.

Another source, a standard college textbook on the philosophy of science, provides a chapter with descriptions and graphic illustrations from one of Addey's studies as an example of astrological research. The study extended the statistical research of Michel Gauquelin by applying harmonic analysis to the data. "Addey found that, as the planetary position at birth changed, the personality traits (determined from biographies) varied smoothly as in a spectrum... The spectrum repeats itself every quadrant." However, "As Addey points out, planets with variable meanings are quite contrary to what astrology predicts." The authors regret that "sadly, this intriguing work was cut short by Addey's untimely death."

== Writings ==
Addey wrote numerous articles – mainly for the Astrological Journal, many of which are now available in his Harmonic Anthology (1976, new edition, AFA, 2011) and Selected Writings (AFA, 1976); his main work was Harmonics in Astrology (1975, latest edition, Eyebright Books, 2010). He was some way through a further book, A New Study of Astrology when he was taken ill in the winter of 1982 – this was completed by Charles Harvey and Tim Addey some years later (Urania Trust, 1996). The latter work included as appendices two small monographs – Astrology Reborn (originally published in 1972) and The Discrimination of Birthtypes (1974).
