= Deborah Houlding =

British astrologer

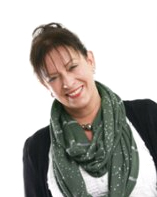
- Deborah Houlding
- Born: 14 May 1962; Mansfield, United Kingdom
- Occupation: Astrologer
- Awards: Astrological Associations of Great Britain, Romania, Perugia, Italy.
- Website: skyscript.co.uk/deb/index.html

Deborah Houlding (born 14 May 1962 in Mansfield) is an English author researcher, educator, and publisher who specializes in astrology. She has been referred to as "one of the UK's top astrologers". She wrote The Houses: Temples of the Sky. (Ascella, 1996) and created the Skyscript website. Houlding has been awarded by the Astrological Associations of Great Britain, Romania, and others.

Houlding's views about such subjects as the twin Gemini stars have been commented on in journals such as the Mountain Astrologer. She has written about the development of the zodiac as well as the cycles of Venus. She was editor of The Traditional Astrologer magazine and is principal of the STA School of Traditional Horary Astrology, and has spoken at conferences on astrological topics.
