= Sumanadasa Abeygunawardena =

Sri Lankan astrologer

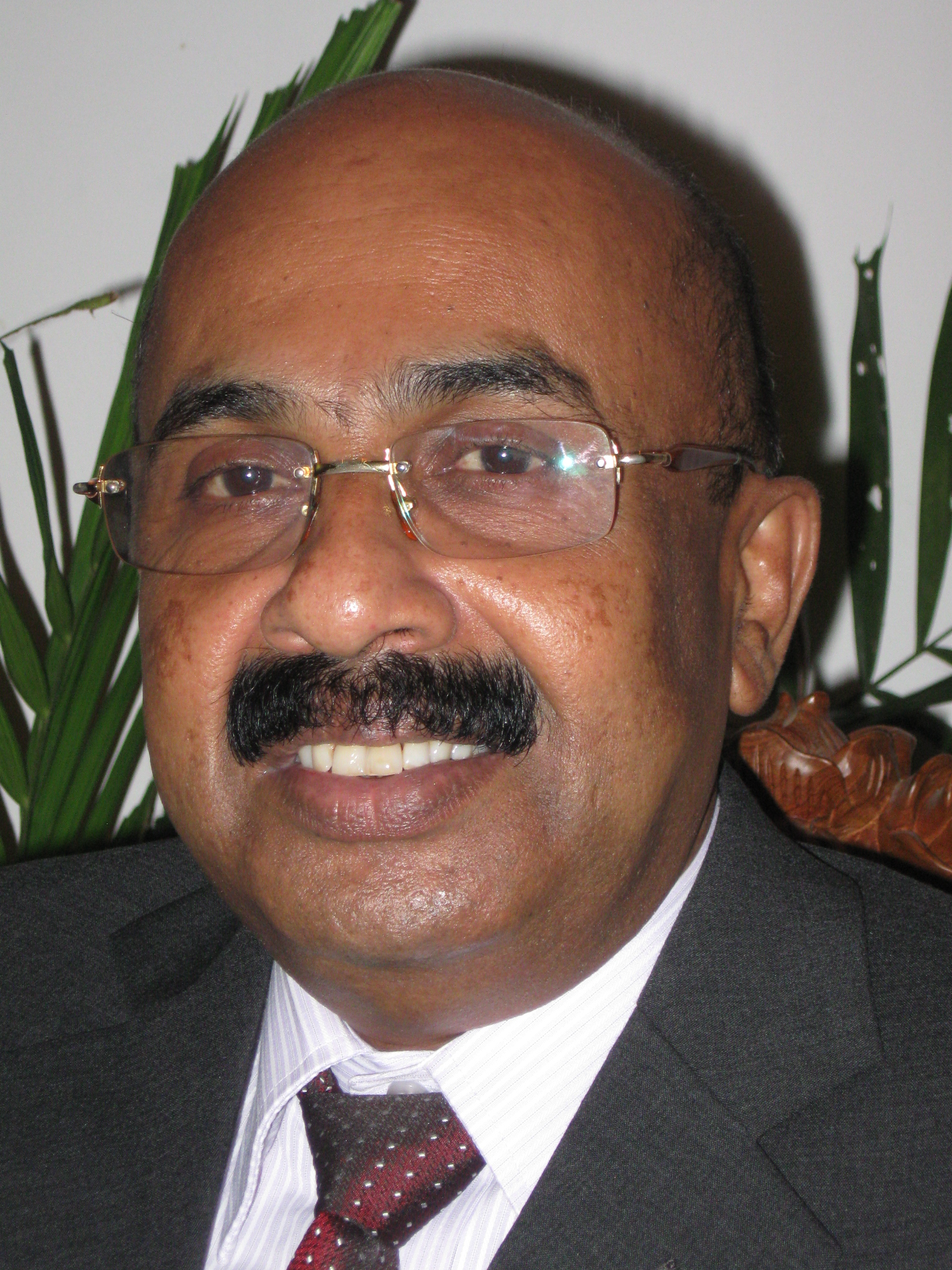
- Born: 28 June 1953; Deniyaya, Sri Lanka
- Education: Morawaka Central College
- Occupation: Astrologer
- Known for: Defeat of Mahinda Rajapaksa
- Opponents: Maithripala Sirisena; Ranil Wickremesinghe
- Spouse: Meepage Chandra Girlie
- Children: Hansini Ruvanthika, Thilanka Sandamalie
- Website: Official Website

Sumanadasa Tilak Abeygunawardena (known as Sumanadasa Abeygunawardena) is a Sri Lankan astrologer, author and commentator on radio and television news. He also served as the working Director for the National Savings Bank.

== Astrological career ==
Abeygunawardena was the self-proclaimed "Royal Astrologer" to the former Sri Lankan President Mahinda Rajapaksa, and his main work was identifying auspicious timing for the president's political acts. Before calling presidential elections two years ahead of schedule, Rajapaksa consulted Abeygunawardena, who foresaw a "big victory" not just for a third but also a fourth term in office due to Rajapaksa's "great inborn power". However, Rajapaksa lost the election to his main opponent Maithripala Sirisena. Abeygunawardena initially declined to comment on this wrong prediction and avoided the media, but later said that "even Nostradamus got things wrong."

== Personal life ==
He was born on 28 June 1953 to a family in Deniyaya Matara District. He is the seventh son of Don Siyadoris Abeygunawardena and Jasin Korale Arachchige Somawathie. Don Siyadoris Abeygunawardena was a village committee Chairman of Morawaka. Sumanadasa Abeygunawardena has three elder sisters, three elder brothers & another two sisters younger to him. He was educated at Morawaka Central College in Deniyaya.

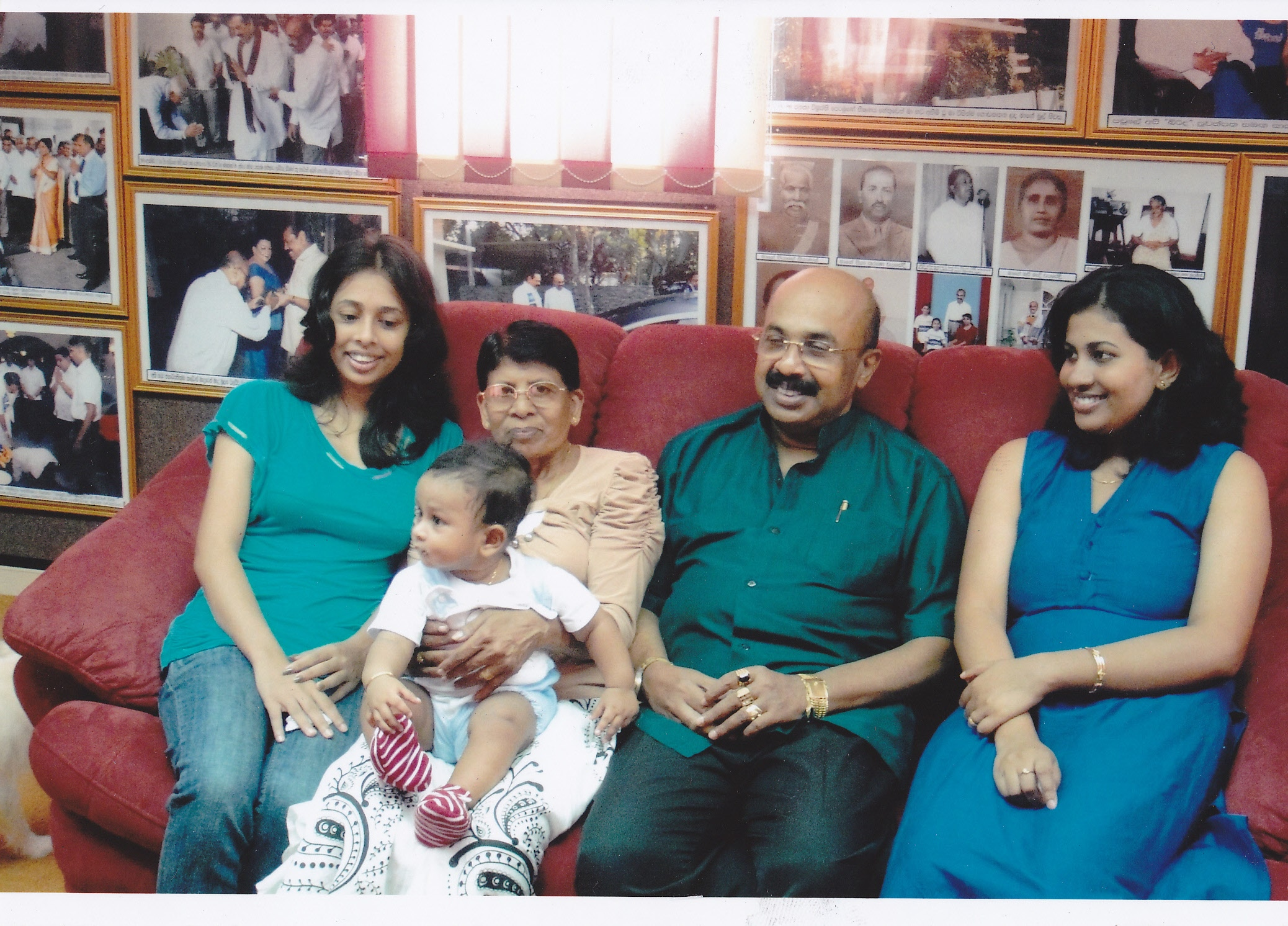
Mr.Sumanadasa Abeygunawardena's Family
