= John of Eschenden =

Astrologer of the fourteenth century

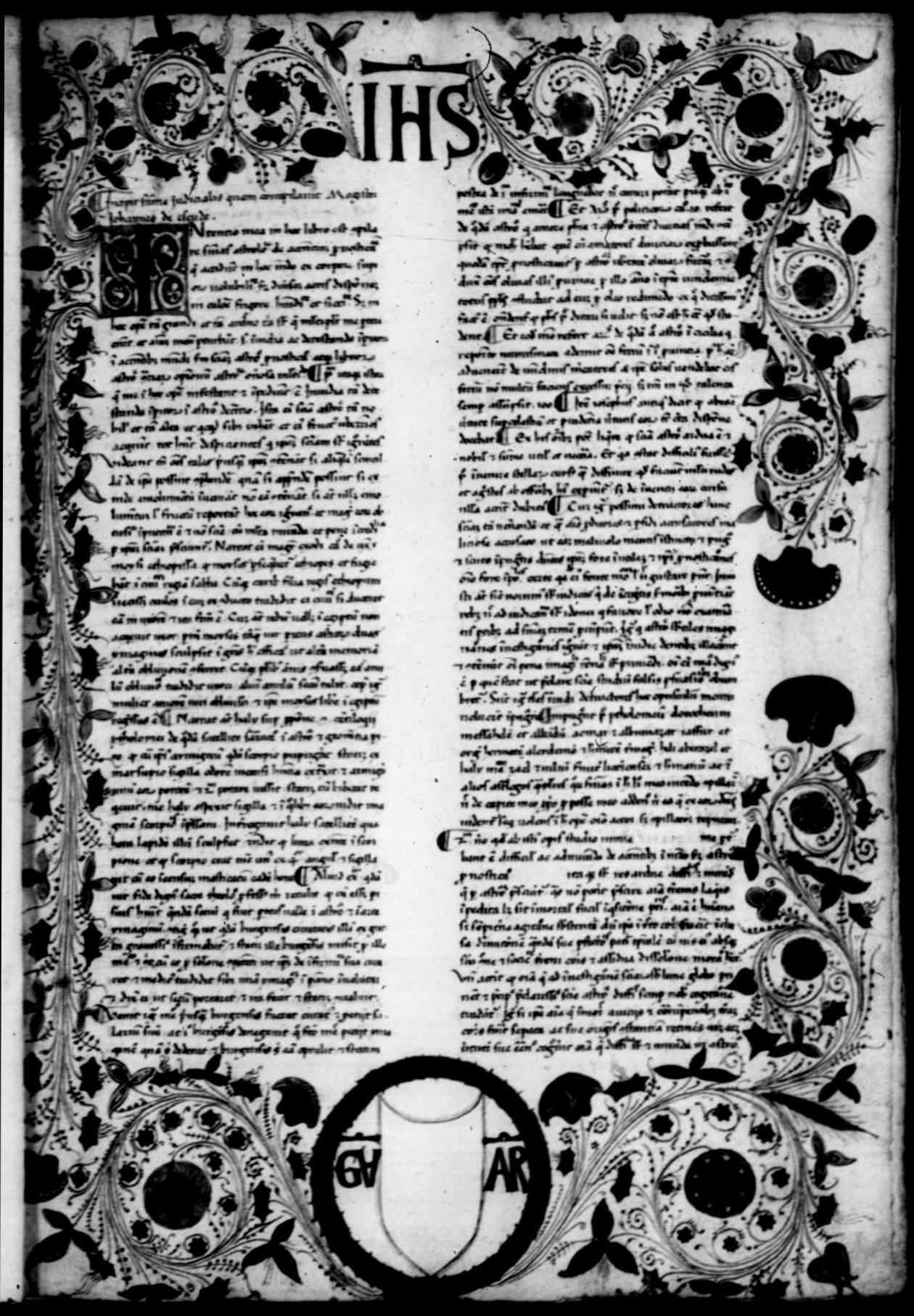
De accidentibus mundi summa iudicialis, 15th-century manuscript. Milan, Biblioteca Ambrosiana, Fondo manoscritti, ms. A 201 inf. - 15th century - ff. 129

John of Eschenden was a fourteenth-century English astrologer. He was supposed to have predicted the onset of the Black Death. He also was one of those applying astrological techniques to the Apocalypse. Eschenden's reputation was assured by the 1489 publication of the Summa astrologiae judicialis (Summa Anglicana), attributed to him.
