= Chandramauli Upadhyay =

Indian astrologer (born 1955)

- Born: November 1955 (age 70); Varanasi, Uttar Pradesh, India
- Occupation: Educationist

Chandra Mauli Upadhyay is an Indian astrologer and head of Jyotish department, Banaras Hindu University.

== Early life and career ==
He was born in the year 1955 in the holy city of Varanasi, India. Upadhyay is Head of the Department of Jyotish center at Banaras Hindu University, Varanasi. He is a Ph.D holder in astrology from Banaras Hindu University, Varanasi and teaches Jyotishi (astrology) in SVDV, BHU as Professor. Upadhyay has been teaching astrology since 1989. He started learning astrology in childhood from his father Pandit Prof. Rajmohan Upadhyay, former dean of Jyotish Department, Banaras Hindu University and Chief Editor of Vishwa Panchangam. His father was also an astrologer. He has been honored by Shri Kashi Vishwanath Mandir Trust for his contributions in the field of astrology and by many other societies and organizations like Ganga Seva Nidhi, Rotary Club etc. for his contributions. Apart from being an educationist, Upadhyay is associated with institutions such as Sri Kashi Vishwanath Temple, Varanasi (One of the Twelve Jyotirlingas) as Trustee.

== Positions held ==
- Head of the Department Jyotish, Banaras Hindu University
- Professor, Banaras Hindu University
- Trustee, Shri Kashi Vishwanath Temple, Varanasi
- Founder Member, Saarvbhaum Pandit Mahasabha, Varanasi
- Treasurer, Jyotish Vigyan Samiti, Varanasi
- Executive Manager, Shri Kashi Vishwanath Temple, Banaras Hindu University Varanasi
- Trustee of Mundeshwari Temple in Bihar
- Member of Academic council Jammu Central University

== Publications ==
Books

1. Daivajnabharnam
2. Vastuprabandha
3. Sarvijaytantram
4. Samudrik Jyotish
5. Kuja Dosha Parihar
6. Gol Vimarsha
7. Prashna Vimarsha
