= William of Marseille =

13th-century medical astrologer

William of Marseille was a thirteenth-century English academic, teaching in France. He is known for the medical-astrological treatise De urina non visa. The method is to use a horoscope to deduce properties of the urine of a patient for diagnosis, when the urine itself cannot be obtained. This book was still used at the University of Bologna in 1405.

== Works ==
From Liste lateinischer Autoren und anonymer Werke des 13. Jahrhunderts (ca. 1170-1320)

- Astrologia
- De urina non visa (1219)
- Tabula de stellis fixis
- Tractatus de meteoris (c. 1230)
