= Reinhold Ebertin =

German astrologer and physician

Reinhold Ebertin (February 16, 1901 – March 14, 1988) was a German school teacher, publisher and astrologer.

== Life and work ==
Ebertin utilized the research on astrological midpoints of Hamburg School surveyor and astrologer Alfred Witte first published in 1928 in Witte's Regelwerk für Planetenbilder. Shortly after Witte's death in 1941, Ebertin used Witte's extensive research on astrological midpoints, and a 4th-harmonic "90° dial" developed by the Hamburg School of Astrology as the foundations of his School of Cosmobiology. Ebertin continued to promote astrological research, including medical applications of astrology while non-compliant Hamburg School astrologers were interned by the Third Reich, their books and publications banned.

Reinhold Ebertin's main reference text on Cosmobiology entitled The Combination of Stellar Influences, sometimes referred to as the 'CSI' or the 'COSI', was inspired by Alfred Witte's Rulebook of Planetary Pictures . Ebertin's book was first published in 1940 and the most recent updates in the English translation were added in 1972. Ebertin's greatest and most truly original contribution was his research in the field of medical astrology and his addition of more psychological correlations. Ebertin worked with the "Anatomical Correspondences of the Zodiac Degrees" as presented in the "Organuhr der anatomischen Entsprechungen" of Fritz Brandau.

Due to Ebertin's work, he is sometimes considered the founder of modern Cosmobiology as the term is generally used today (working largely with the midpoint/dial paradigms of Witte), although the term 'Kosmobiologie' had been previously used by Dr Friedrich Feerhow and Swiss statistician Karl Krafft in a more general sense "to designate that branch of astrology working on scientific foundations and keyed to the natural sciences".

== Family ==
Ebertin's mother, Elsbeth Ebertin, was also an astrologer. His son, Dr. Baldur Ebertin, is "a psychologist, philosopher, esoteric, alternative healer, reincarnation-therapist, psychoanalyst, astrologer, and author".

== List of published works ==
- The Combination of Stellar Influences
- Cosmic Marriage
- Transits: What Days Favor You?
- Rapid & Reliable Analysis
- Fixed Stars & Their Interpretation
- Auxiliary Tables for the Calculation of the Stellar Positions
- an English translation of his book Astrological Healing was published in 1989
