= Alfred Witte =

German astrologer

Alfred Witte (2 March 1878 in Hamburg, Germany – 4 August 1941 in Hamburg, Germany), was a German surveyor, astrologer, an amateur astronomer, and the founder of the Hamburg School of Astrology. Witte revived and further developed the use of astrological midpoints (a+b)/2 for precision in astrological analysis and prediction. Alfred Witte was found dead at 9:45 a.m. on 4 August 1941, in Hamburg.

== Writings ==
In his early writings between 1919 and 1925 (his first was 1913), he experimented with numerous historical astrology techniques, including the astrological houses, planetary formulae a+b-c = c similar to Arabic parts, and for a brief period a new scheme of planetary rulerships. His approach to astrology was to verify assumptions by current reality checks rather than historical validation. He sought to approach astrology as a science, and the controversy over his assertion of the existence of Trans-Neptunian objects other than Pluto led to widespread ridicule and rejection during his later years.

== Trans-Neptunian hypothesis ==
In Witte's times, many astronomers proposed hypothetical Trans-Neptunian objects. So Witte proposed the existence of several hypothetical Trans-Neptunian objects, too. While modern technology has verified the existence of thousands of Trans-Neptunian objects, the specific Trans-Neptunian objects that are used by the Hamburg School and Uranian astrology have not yet been validated or disproven as of September 2011. Some members of the Hamburg School have for a number of years asserted that some of Witte's Trans-Neptunians may actually be the barycenters of clusters of Trans-Neptunian objects, and shun both the labels "planet" and "object" for this reason. Witte did however describe the colors of two of his inner Transneptunians, Cupido and Hades, in articles in the anthology Der Mensch - Eine Empfangsstation kosmischer Suggestionen.

Witte was prohibited by the Third Reich from recording his observations during the last years of his life.

== Persecution and death ==
Witte was considered an enemy of the German Third Reich (Nazi Germany) and his main book, the Regelwerk für Planetenbilder (Rulebook for Planetary Pictures) was banned on 2 October 1936 and later burned by the Nazis. Astrologers were interned in June 1941, including Rudolph. Witte was not interned but he was under police observation by the GeStaPo.

Worried about his state pension, he committed suicide in 1941. Witte was found dead at 9:45 a.m. on 4 August 1941, in Hamburg. He was 63. After 1945 when the war ended, his work was resurrected by his students, among whom was Ludwig Rudolph who survived incarceration.

== U.S. publication ==
The American Richard Svehla, owner of the Phoenix Bookshop, Cleveland, Ohio, was in the early 1930s one of the first who introduced Witte Astrology in the USA. He received the authorization for the translation of the "Rules for Planetary Pictures". It was published under the subtitle "Uranian System of Astrology - Hamburg School by Alfred Witte" in 1939.

In the mid 20th century, a collection of Witte's observations and techniques came to be described in the English speaking world as Uranian astrology.

== Groups of Alfred Witte's Astrology ("Uranians") ==
- Astrologenverein "Hamburger Schule", Hamburg, est. 1925
- "Witte-Studiengemeinschaft Düsseldorf", Düsseldorf, est. 1932
- "Astrologische Studiengesellschaft (Hamburger Schule)", Hamburg, est. 1947
- The "Uranian Circle", Chicago, USA, est. 1965
- The "Bangkok Astrological School", Bangkok, Thailand, est. 1972
- The "Uranian Society", New York City, USA, est. 1985
- "Uranian Astrologers Club Thailand" (UACT), Bangkok, Thailand, est. 2001
- The "International Uranian Fellowship", The Hague, Netherlands, est. 2007

== See also ==
- Cosmobiology
- Hamburg School of Astrology
