= John Gadbury =

English astrologer (1627–1704)

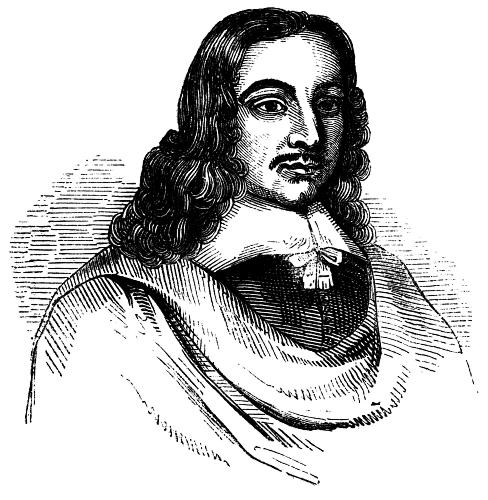
John Gadbury.

John Gadbury (1627–1704) was an English astrologer, and a prolific writer of almanacs and on other related topics. Initially a follower or disciple, and a defender in the 1650s, of William Lilly, he eventually turned against Lilly and denounced him in 1675 as fraudulent.

His 1652 work Philastrogus Knavery Epitomized was a reply to Lillies Ape Whipt by the pseudonymous Philastrogus, defending Lilly, Nicholas Culpeper and others.

His father William was an estate worker for Sir John Curson of Waterperry House near Wheatley, Oxfordshire, who eloped with Frances, a daughter of the house, a year before John's birth. However, John Gadbury persuaded his grandfather Sir John to put him through Oxford, before his astrological training.

He became a High Tory and Catholic convert. He had a number of brushes with the authorities: imprisonment (wrongful) at the time of the Popish Plot and suspicion later of plotting against William III of England; also trouble for omitting Guy Fawkes Day from his almanacs. He feuded with fellow astrologer John Partridge, a supporter of the Whigs.

== See also ==
- Heliocentric astrology

== Sources ==
Concise Dictionary of National Biography
