= Andrews (surname) =

Andrews is a patronymic surname of English, Scottish, and Norse origin. At the time of the 1881 British Census, its relative frequency was highest in Dorset (3.6 times the British average), followed by Wiltshire, Huntingdonshire, Worcestershire, Hampshire, Suffolk, Cambridgeshire, Devon and Somerset.

The surname Andrews was first found in Caithness, North Scotland. Historically, the Andrews clan were closely associated with Clan Ross. The Andrews of Scotland dispersed during the 17th, 18th, and 19th centuries and are now found worldwide in America, Canada, and Australia. Many Andrews also moved to Northern Ireland and England.

== A ==
- A. W. Andrews (1868–1959), British pioneer rock-climber
- Abraham D. Andrews (1830–1885), American politician
- Al Andrews (born 1945), US American footballer
- Albert Andrews (1881–1960), Canadian politician
- Albert LeRoy Andrews (1878–1961), American professor of Germanic philology and avocational bryologist
- Allan Andrews (disambiguation), multiple people
- Alicia Andrews (born 1966 or 1967), American politician
- Andy Andrews (tennis) (born 1959), American tennis player
- Annie Dale Biddle Andrews, American who was the first woman to earn a Ph.D. in mathematics from Berkeley
- Anthony Andrews (born 1948), British actor (Under the Volcano)
- Arlan Andrews (born 1940), American mechanical engineer and writer
- Arthur Andrews (disambiguation), multiple people

== B ==
- Barbara Andrews (novelist), American novelist
- Barry Andrews (disambiguation), multiple people
- Ben Andrews (actor) (1942–1981), American television actor
- Ben Andrews (mathematician), Australian mathematician
- Bill Andrews (disambiguation), multiple people
- Billy Andrews (footballer) (1886-?), Irish footballer
- Billy Andrews (born 1945), US American footballer
- Blake Andrews (born 1968), American photographer
- Bob Andrews (keyboardist) (1949–2025), English keyboardist with Brinsley Schwarz
- Bob Andrews (guitarist) (born 1959), English musician with Generation X
- Bobby Andrews (born 1976), Filipino film actor
- Brian Andrews (actor), American actor
- Brian Andrews (doctor) (born 1955), Canadian-American neurosurgeon
- Brittany Andrews (born 1973), American porn actress
- Bruce Andrews (born 1948), American poet
- Bryan Andrews (cricketer) (born 1945), New Zealand cricketer
- Bryan Andrews (storyboard artist), American storyboard artist and writer
- Bunny Andrews, US American footballer

== C ==
- Carl Andrews (politician), American politician
- Charles Andrews (disambiguation), multiple people
- Chris Andrews (disambiguation), multiple people
- Christopher Columbus Andrews (1829–1922), American brigadier general
- Clayton Andrews (baseball, born 1997), American professional baseball player
- Clifford Andrews (1912–1973), English cricketer
- T. Coleman Andrews (1899–1983), American presidential candidate

== D ==
- Daisy Andrews (c. 1934 or 1935–2015), Australian painter
- Damon Andrews (born 1971), New Zealand actor and director
- Dana Andrews (1909–1992), American actor and President of the Screen Actors Guild
- Daniel Andrews (born 1972), Australian politician
- Danny Andrews, American Paralympic athlete
- Darren Andrews (born 1995), American football player
- David Andrews (disambiguation), multiple people
- Dean Andrews (born 1963), British actor
- Dean Andrews Jr. (1922–1981), American attorney involved in the JFK assassination investigation
- Del Andrews (1894–1942), American director and screenwriter (The Racket, All Quiet on the Western Front)
- Denise Andrews (born 1959), American politician
- Deno Andrews (born 1971), American billiards player
- Don Andrews (born 1942 as Vilim Zlomislić), Canadian white-supremacist
- Donald Andrews (born 1955), Canadian economist
- Donna Andrews (golfer) (born 1967), American golfer
- Donna Andrews (writer), American writer
- Duane Andrews (born 1972), Canadian guitarist and composer
- Dylan Andrews (born 1979), New Zealand mixed martial artist

== E ==
- Eamonn Andrews (1922–1987), Irish television presenter
- Ed Andrews (1859–1934), American baseball player
- Eddie Andrews (rugby union) (born 1977), South African rugby union footballer
- Edgar Andrews (born 1932), English physicist and engineer
- Edith Alice Andrews (1873–1958), British artist
- Edith Lovell Andrews (1886–1980), British artist
- Edmund L. Andrews, American journalist and writer, The New York Times economics reporter
- Edmund Andrews (surgeon) (1824–1904), American surgeon
- Edward Andrews (1914–1985), American actor
- Edward Gayer Andrews (1825–1907), Bishop of the Methodist Episcopal Church
- Elisha Benjamin Andrews (1844–1917), American economist
- Elizabeth Andrews (1882–1960), Labour Party organiser in Wales
- Elizabeth B. Andrews (1911–2002), U.S. congresswoman from Alabama
- Emily Augusta Patmore (née Andrews) (1824–1862), British author, Pre-Raphaelite muse, inspiration for the poem The Angel in the House
- Eric Andrews (1933–2001), Australian historian
- Erica Andrews (1969–2013), stage name of Erica Salazar, Mexican-American performer
- Erin Andrews (born 1978), American sportscaster
- Ernie Andrews (1927–2022), American jazz, blues, and pop singer
- Esao Andrews (born 1978), American painter

== F ==
- Finn Andrews (born 1983), English musician
- Florence Andrews (1912–1996), New Zealand fencer
- Francis Andrews (1718–1774), Irish politician
- Frank Andrews (disambiguation), multiple people
- Fred Andrews (disambiguation), multiple people

== G ==
- Gareth Andrews (born 1946), Australian rules footballer from Victoria
- Garry Andrews (born 1957), Australian artist
- George Andrews (disambiguation), multiple people
- Georgina Andrews, Australian actress
- Gerald Smedley Andrews (1903–2005), Canadian surveyor
- Geraldine Andrews (born 1959), judge of the High Court of England and Wales
- Giuseppe Andrews (born 1975), American actor and director

== H ==
- Harold Andrews (disambiguation), multiple people
- Harris Andrews (born 1996), Australian rules footballer
- Harry Andrews (1911–1989), British actor (The Ruling Class)
- Harvey Andrews (born 1943), British folk musician
- Helena Andrews (born 1980), American author, journalist and critic
- Henry Andrews (mathematician) (1744–1820), British mathematician and astronomer
- Henry Andrews (cricketer) (1821–1865), English cricketer
- Henry Cranke Andrews (fl. 1794–1830), English botanist, botanical artist and engraver
- Henry John Andrews (1871–1919), British Army officer
- Herbert Kennedy Andrews (1904–1965), British composer and organist
- Hub Andrews (1922–2012), American baseball player

== I ==
- Ian Andrews (born 1964), English footballer
- Ike Franklin Andrews (1925–2010), American politician
- Inez Andrews (1929–2012), American gospel singer
- Irene Osgood Andrews (1879–?), American writer
- Isobel Andrews (1905–1990), New Zealand playwright, novelist, short-story writer and poet

== J ==
- Jack Andrews (1898–1974), English footballer
- Jack Andrews (1903–1986), Northern Ireland politician, son of J. M. Andrews
- Jake Andrews (disambiguation), multiple people
- James Andrews (botanical artist) (1801–1876), English botanical artist
- Sir James Andrews, 1st Baronet (1877–1951), member of Privy Council of Northern Ireland
- James Andrews (physician) (born 1942), American orthopedic surgeon
- James J. Andrews (1829–1862), Unionist spy during the American Civil War
- James J. Andrews (mathematician) (1930–1998), American mathematician
- James Pettit Andrews (c. 1737–1797), English historian
- Jane Andrews (author) (1833–1887), American author of children's books
- Jane Andrews (born 1967), English former Royal dresser and convicted murderer of Tom Cressman
- Jessica Andrews (born 1983), American country singer
- Jessie Andrews (born 1992), American porn actress
- Jim Andrews (1865–1907), American baseball player
- Jimmy Andrews (1927–2012), Scottish footballer
- Jim Wynorski, goes by Jay Andrews, American film director
- Joely Andrews (born 2002), Northern Irish footballer
- John Andrews (disambiguation), multiple people
- John Bertram Andrews (1880–1943), American economist
- J. M. Andrews (1871–1956), Northern Ireland politician, 2nd Prime Minister of Northern Ireland
- John Nevins Andrews (1829–1883), American Seventh-day Adventist Church missionary
- Joseph Andrews (disambiguation), multiple people
- Josh Andrews (born 1991), American football player
- Judith Walker Andrews (1826–1914), American philanthropist and social reformer
- Julie Andrews (born 1935), British actress

== K ==
- Kaare Andrews (born 1975), Canadian comic book artist and filmmaker
- Karen Andrews (born 1960), Australian politician
- Kay Andrews, Baroness Andrews (born 1943), British Labour politician
- Keith Andrews (disambiguation), multiple people
- Kelly Andrews (disambiguation), multiple people
- Ken Andrews (born 1967), American musician
- Kenneth R. Andrews (1916–2005), American academic and a 'father' of Corporate Strategy
- Kenneth Andrews (sociologist), American sociologist
- Kerri Andrews (fl. 2025), British writer and editor
- Kevin Andrews (disambiguation), multiple people

== L ==
- LaVerne Andrews (1911–1967), American singer with the Andrews Sisters
- Lee Andrews (born 1984), English footballer
- Lee Andrews & the Hearts lead singer Lee Andrews (1936–2016), American singer
- LeRoy Andrews (1896–1978), US American football player and coach
- Lilian Andrews (1878–c.1962), English artist
- Linda Andrews (singer) (born 1973), Faroese singer
- Lloyd Andrews (ice hockey) (1894–1974), Canadian ice-hockey player
- Lloyd J. Andrews (1920–2014), American politician and businessman
- Lois Andrews (1924–1968), American actress
- Lori Andrews, American law professor

== M ==
- Mahala Andrews (1939–1997), British vertebrae palaeontologist
- Maidie Andrews (1893–1986), British actress
- Major Andre Andrews (1792–1834), American politician
- Malcolm Andrews (1944–2018), Australian author and journalist
- Marie Louise Andrews (1849–1891), American writer
- Mark Andrews (disambiguation), multiple people
- Marvin Andrews (born 1975), footballer from Trinidad and Tobago
- Mary Andrews (disambiguation), multiple people
- Matthew Andrews, electrical engineer
- Maxene Andrews (1916–1995), American singer with the Andrews Sisters
- Michael Andrews (disambiguation), multiple people
- Michelle Andrews (born 1971), Australian field hockey midfielder

== N ==
- Nate Andrews (1913–1991), American baseball pitcher
- Naveen Andrews (born 1969), British actor
- Niall Andrews (1937–2006), Irish politician
- Nigel Andrews, British journalist
- Noel Andrews (1932–2011), Irish radio and television commentator and disc jockey
- Norman Andrews (1899–1971), English cricketer

== O ==
- Olive Andrews (1818-?), twenty-third wife of Brigham Young
- Orianna Andrews (1834–1883), American medical doctor
- Oscar Andrews (1876–1956), Irish cricketer and field hockey player

== P ==
- Patrick Franklin Andrews (born 1980), American criminal and serial killer
- Patty Andrews (1918–2013), American singer with the Andrews Sisters
- Paul Andrews (disambiguation), multiple people
- Peter Andrews (disambiguation), multiple people
- Phil Andrews (disambiguation), multiple people

== Q ==
- Quinton Andrews (born 1987), US American football player

== R ==
- Richard Andrews (disambiguation), multiple people
- Ricky Andrews (born 1966), Samoan who played American and Canadian football
- Robert Andrews (disambiguation), multiple people
- Romel Andrews (born 1963), American player of gridiron football
- Ron Andrews (born 1955), Australian rules footballer from Victoria
- Roy Chapman Andrews (1884–1960), American explorer, adventurer and naturalist
- Ruby Star Andrews (born 2004), New Zealand freestyle skier

== S ==
- Samuel Andrews (disambiguation), multiple people
- Sarah Andrews (author), American geologist and author
- Sarah Andrews (cricketer) (born 1981), Australian cricketer
- Sasha Andrews (born 1983), Canadian football (soccer) defender
- Scott Andrews (racing driver) (born 1990), Australian racing driver
- Shane Andrews (born 1971), American baseball player
- Shawn Andrews (American football) (born 1982), US American football player
- Shelley Andrews (born 1953), Canadian field hockey player
- Simon Andrews (disambiguation), multiple people
- Solomon Andrews (inventor) (1806–1872), U.S. politician and inventor of a dirigible aircraft
- Solomon Andrews (businessman) (1835–1908), English entrepreneur in Wales
- Stephen Andrews (born 1956), Canadian Anglican bishop
- Stephen Andrews (artist) (born 1956), Canadian artist
- Stephen Pearl Andrews (1812–1886), American anarchist
- Steve Andrews aka "The Bard of Ely" (born 1953), Welsh singer-songwriter, writer and journalist
- Susan Andrews (born 1971), Australian (Tasmanian) athlete
- Sybil Andrews (1898–1992), English artist
- Sydnee Andrews (born 2002), New Zealand judoka

== T ==
- Tara Andrews (born 1994), Australian (soccer) footballer
- Ted Andrews (1952–2009), American author
- Thea Andrews (born 1973), Canadian journalist, sports and entertainment television personality
- Theresa Andrews (born 1962), American backstroke swimmer
- Thomas Andrews (1873–1912), British businessman and shipbuilder, architect of RMS Titanic
- Thomas Andrews (disambiguation), multiple people
- Todd Andrews (1901–1985), Irish Republican political activist, Fianna Fáil founder
- Tommie Lee Andrews, American, first person to be convicted as a result of DNA evidence
- Tracie Andrews (born 1969), Englishwomen convicted of murdering her fiancé
- Tyson Andrews (born 1990), Australian Rugby League player

== V ==
- V. C. Andrews (1923–1986), American novelist

== W ==
- Wally Andrews (1859–1940), American baseball catcher
- Wayne Andrews (disambiguation), multiple people
- William Andrews (disambiguation), multiple people

== Y ==
- Yvette Borup Andrews (1891–1959), American photographer

== Fictional characters ==
- Archie Andrews (comics), fictional character from the Archie Comics
- Archie Andrews (puppet), character of British ventriloquist Peter Brough
- Jessica Andrews, character in The Karate Kid Part III
- Pamela Andrews, character from Pamela, or Virtue Rewarded
- Paul Andrews, a character in the 1989 American science-fiction drama movie Beyond the Stars
- Sydney Andrews, character from Melrose Place

== See also ==
- Andrew
- Andrews (disambiguation)
- Andrew § Andrew-surname, other similar surnames
- S. W. Erdnase Some card magic historians theorize this may be a pseudonym for an anonymous writer named Andrews; i.e., "E. S. Andrews" spelled backward.
