= Andrewe =

Andrewe is a surname. Notable people with the surname include:

- Laurence Andrewe (fl. 1510–1537), French translator and printer
- Thomas Andrewe (fl. 1604), English poet

== See also ==
- Andrewes
- Andrew (surname)
- Andrews (surname)
