= Henry Andrews =

Henry Andrews may refer to:

- Henry Andrews (mathematician) (1744–1820), British mathematician and astronomer
- Henry Cranke Andrews (fl. 1794–1830), English botanist
- Henry John Andrews (1871–1919), English recipient of the Victoria Cross
- Henry Andrews (cricketer) (1821–1865), English cricketer
- Henry Nathaniel Andrews (1910–2002), American paleobotanist

== Fictional characters ==
- Henry Andrews (CSI), television series fictional character

== See also ==
- Harry Andrews (1911–1989), English actor
