= William Andrews =

William or Willie Andrews may refer to:

== Politics and law ==
- William Drennan Andrews (1832–1924), Irish judge
- William Henry Andrews (1846–1919), American politician
- William E. Andrews (1854–1942), U.S. congressman from Nebraska
- William Shankland Andrews (1858–1936), American lawyer, judge, and politician
- William L. Andrews (1865–1936), American politician in the Virginia Senate
- William H. Andrews (unionist) (1870–1950), English politician in South Africa
- William N. Andrews (1876–1937), U.S. congressman from Maryland
- William T. Andrews (1898–1984), American politician in the New York State Assembly
- William C. Andrews (1934–2021), American politician in the Florida House of Representatives
- William F. Andrews (politician) (born 1946), American politician in the Florida House of Representatives
- William Andrews III (born 1952), American politician in the Mississippi House of Representatives

== Religion ==
- William Andrews (priest) (fl. 1702–1736), Irish Anglican priest and educationalist
- William Eusebius Andrews (1773–1837), English religious journalist
- William Watson Andrews (1810–1897), American clergyman of the Catholic Apostolic Church
- William Buckton Andrews (1829–1918), Anglican clergyman in South Australia, a.k.a. "Canon Andrews"

== Science and medicine ==
- William Andrews (naturalist) (1802–1880), English naturalist
- William Symes Andrews (1847–1929), English electrical engineer
- William H. Andrews (biologist) (born 1951), American telomere biologist

== Sports ==
- Curley Andrews (William Andrews, fl. 1940s), American baseball player
- William Andrews (American football) (born 1955), American football player
- Willie Andrews (born 1983), American football player

== Others ==
- William Andrews (astrologer) (fl. 1656–1683), astrologer
- William Andrews (factory manager) (1835–1914), English diarist and factory manager for Cash's of Coventry
- William Andrews (Australian actor) (1836–1878), Australian stage actor and comedian
- William F. Andrews (businessman) (born c. 1933), American businessman
- William Leake Andrews (born 1946), American academic
- William Andrews (comedian) (born 1977), British actor and comedian
- William C. Andrews (art director) (1901–1986), British film set designer
- William Loring Andrews (1837–1920), American rare book collector, publisher, and librarian
- William Andrews, African American laborer lynched in 1897, see lynching of William Andrews

== See also ==
- Billy Andrews (born 1945), American football player
- Billy Andrews (footballer) (1886–?), Irish-American footballer
- Bill Andrews (disambiguation)
