= Walter Andrews =

Walter Andrews may refer to:

- Walter Boyd Andrews (1792–1847), early settler and, briefly, politician of Western Australia
- Walter G. Andrews (1889–1949), U.S. representative from New York
- Walter Andrews (cricketer) (1865–1908), English cricketer
- Walter Andrews (cyclist) (1881–1954), Canadian Olympic cyclist
- Walter Simon Andrews (1847–1899), British policeman
- Walter Andrews (bishop) (1852–1932), Anglican bishop in Japan

== See also ==
- Wally Andrews (William Walter Andrews, 1859–1940), American baseball player
