= Thomas Andrews (disambiguation) =

Thomas Andrews (1873–1912) was the shipbuilder of the RMS Titanic.

Thomas, Tom or Tommy Andrews may also refer to:

== Politics ==
- Thomas Andrews (MP for Dover) (born before 1540), English MP
- Thomas Andrews (MP for Sudbury) (died 1585), MP for Sudbury (UK Parliament constituency)
- Tom Andrews (Australian politician) (1900–1974), Australian politician from Victoria
- Tom Andrews (American politician) (born 1953), American politician from Maine; non-profit executive; and United Nations Special Rapporteur on the Myanmar human rights situation
- T. Coleman Andrews (1899–1983), accountant and independent candidate for president of the United States
- T. Coleman Andrews Jr. (1925–1989), his son, American businessman and politician
- W. Thomas Andrews (1941–2009), Pennsylvania politician

== Sports ==
- Tommy Andrews (cricketer) (1890–1970), Australian cricketer
- Tom Andrews (sprinter) (born 1954), American track and field athlete
- Tom Andrews (American football) (born 1962), American NFL football player
- Tom Andrews (cricketer) (born 1994), Australian cricketer

== Other ==
- Thomas Andrewes (died 1659), English financier who supported the parliament cause during the English Civil War
- Thomas Andrews (metallurgist) (1811–1871), British metallurgist of international renown
- Thomas Andrews (scientist) (1813–1885), Irish chemist and physicist
- Thomas Andrews (ironmaster) (1847–1907), English ironmaker and Fellow of the Royal Society
- Tom Andrews (poet) (1961–2001), American poet and critic
- Thomas G. Andrews (historian), American historian
- Thomas G. Andrews (judge) (1892–1942), American attorney and justice of the Oklahoma Supreme Court
- T. Bill Andrews, American abstract impressionist painter, author and lawyer

== See also ==
- Andrews (surname)
- Thomas Andrew (disambiguation)
