= Thomas Andrew =

Thomas Andrew may refer to:

- Thomas Andrew (cricketer) (1843–1927), Scottish-born New Zealand cricketer
- Thomas Andrew (photographer) (1855–1939), New Zealand photographer
- Thomas Andrew (MP) (died 1517), English MP for Exeter
- Thomas Andrew (choreographer) (1932–1984), né Edward Thomas Andrulewicz and a son of Teddy Andrulewicz
- Thomas Andrew (sprinter), winner of the 1977 NCAA Division I Men's 4 × 100 m

== See also ==
- Thomas Andrewe, poet
- Thomas Andrews (disambiguation)
