= Bill Andrews =

Bill Andrews may refer to:

- William H. Andrews (unionist) (1870–1950), South African trade union leader and politician
- Bill Andrews (cricketer) (1908–1989), English cricketer
- Bill Andrews (photographer) (1944–2017), American surfer, documentary photographer, and archivist
- Bill Andrews (drummer) (born 1966), American musician
- T. Bill Andrews (born 1958), American abstract painter and writer
- William C. Andrews (art director) (1901–1986), British production designer

== See also ==
- Billy Andrews (born 1945), American football player
- Billy Andrews (footballer) (1886–?), Irish-American footballer
- William Andrews (disambiguation)
