= Arthur Andrews =

Arthur Andrews may refer to:

- Arthur Andrews (cricketer) (1856–1943), English cricketer
- Arthur Andrews (footballer, born 1891) (1891–1964), English footballer with Southampton
- Arthur Andrews (footballer, born 1903) (1903–1971), English footballer with Durham City and Sunderland
- Arthur F. Andrews (1876–1930), American cyclist
- Arthur Glenn Andrews (1909–2008), American politician
- Arthur Irving Andrews (1878–1967), American college professor
- Arthur L. Andrews (1934–1996), Chief Master Sergeant of the U.S. Air Force
- A. W. Andrews (1868–1959), British geographer, poet and mountaineer
- Arthur Andrews (This Country), fictional character

== See also ==
- Arthur Andrew (disambiguation)
