= The School and Society =

Book by John Dewey

The School and Society: Being Three Lectures (1899) was John Dewey's first published work of length on education. A highly influential publication in its own right, it would also lay the foundation for his later work. In the lectures included in the initial publication, Dewey proposes a psychological, social, and political framework for progressive education. Notably, this includes collaborative practical experimentation as the central element of school work. He argues that the progressive approach is both an inevitable product of the Industrial Revolution and a natural fit with the psychology of children. A final chapter details some of the experiments done at the University of Chicago Laboratory Schools.

Articles in the 1915 edition extended his argument with reprints of Dewey's work published in the Elementary School Record.

== Background ==
Experimentation in education was widespread in the 19th century, and much of late 19th century experimentation involved the introduction of "hands on" activities into the classroom. Louisa Parsons Stone Hopkins captured the spirit of the time in her speech to the 1890 Boston Mechanic's Fair:

It has been difficult to escape from the traditions of an exclusively book education. The grammar schools, as their name indicates, have tied the child to the dead past, and confined him to the medieval form of brain activity and thought expression, until his connective tissues have ceased to be sensitive to the environment of nature, and he forgets the material and laws that touch him on every side : he observes nothing; he discovers nothing; he constructs nothing.

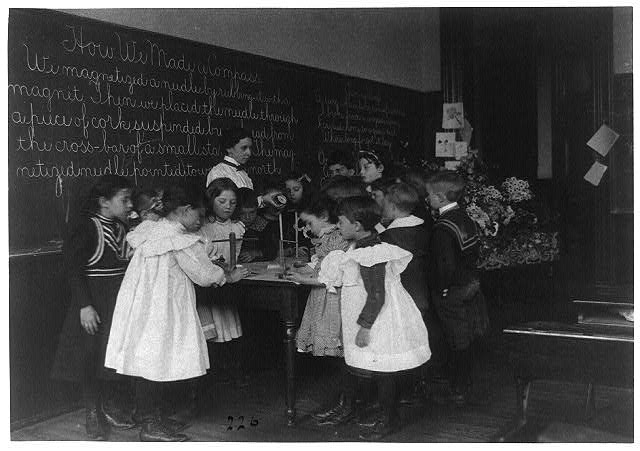
There were many experiments with experiential learning at the time Dewey delivered his lectures. Here young children learn how a compass works by making one in a Washington D. C. school in 1899.

While the introduction of manual tasks in classroom was underway well before The School and Society's publication, Dewey's work helped to lay a coherent theoretical foundation for progressive experimentation in education.

The three lectures that comprise the bulk of the 1899 and 1900 editions were initially given as a fundraising lecture series in support of the Laboratory School. From these lectures, Dewey raised $350 for the school.

The lectures proceed in a pattern, the first dealing with the relation of the school to social progress, the second with the relation of the school to the psychology of the child, and the third with the organization of the school as an institution in accomplishing these aims.

== Synopsis ==
=== The School and Social Progress ===
The first lecture examines the relationship of education and social progress. Dewey argues that, with the coming of the industrial age, many traditional educative processes had been lost. In a pre-industrial society, children learned beside their parents, pairing learning with application and industry. Dewey explains that such work built character, fostering independence and initiative, but that "concentration of industry and division of labor" has eroded the possibility of such meaningful, practical learning opportunities in the childhood home.

In this environment, a "New Education" that is "part and parcel of the whole social evolution" is needed. Fundamentally, education must follow larger shifts in society rather than implement isolated ideas which are "arbitrary inventions" made by "the over-ingenious minds of pedagogues" to deal with their specific challenges. Such ideas constitute "at the worst transitory fads, and at the best merely improvements in certain details." Where the learning opportunities in the home have disappeared, modern schools must now adapt to fill the gap. The school must become the new "child's habitat, where he learns through directed living."

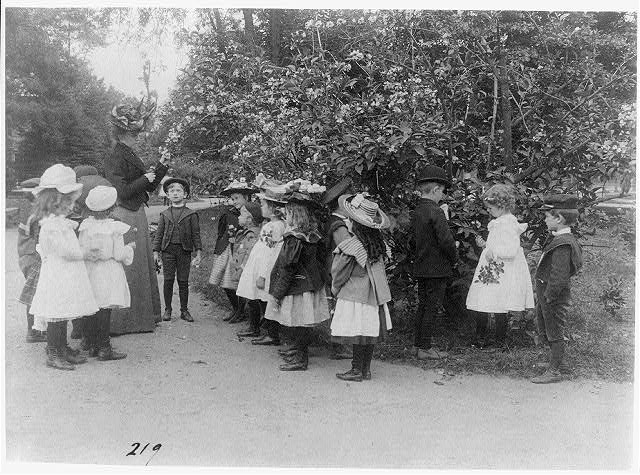
Students participate in a botany class in Washington D. C., 1899. By Frances Benjamin Johnston.

An important part of such an education is "manual training," which includes wood- and metalworking as well as household chores, such as cooking. Dewey tells an extended story of children engaged in sewing at his laboratory school. To do the fiber work they must create raw material from cotton and wool, but in so doing they learn a multitude of lessons in history, geography, engineering, and science. Dewey concludes the story:

I need not speak of the science involved in this — the study of the fibres, of geographical features, the conditions under which raw materials are grown, the great centres of manufacture and distribution, the physics involved in the machinery of production; nor, again, of the historical side — the influence which these inventions have had upon humanity. You can concentrate the history of all mankind into the evolution of the flax, cotton, and wool fibres into clothing.

Dewey makes a plea that theory and practice not be separated, arguing that if we truly want to provide for a cultured populace that we must introduce into the educational process those activities "which appeal to those whose dominant interest is to do and to make." Since knowledge is moving "in all currents of society" we have no choice but to find ways to reach all students.

=== The School and the Life of the Child ===
In the second lecture, the relation between schooling and the child is examined. Here Dewey proposes a student-centered curriculum. Authentic learning is valued, and must be centered on the natural interests of children: their desire to communicate with others, to build things, to inquire about things, and to express themselves artistically.

Dewey begins by talking about the physical bias of the classroom. Student desks are small, crowded together. They have room to hold a book, room for studying, but no room to create. Rather than being a space to work, the classroom is designed as a place to listen and to read. Both are modes of passive absorption. In addition, students are required not only to listen passively, but to listen "en masse".

This "passivity of attitude" and "mechanical massing of children" are due to the rigid curriculum and method, which are still rooted in a "mediæval conception of learning". When the core of a curriculum is listening en masse, then everybody can be tested on the same thing at given intervals. The child in this system is an afterthought; education is structured in a certain way, and the child must bend to it.

Dewey proposes a different "center of gravity" for the instruction: the child him- or herself. This, Dewey claims, is how children are educated in an ideal home setting. Children naturally incline to activity, to conversation, creation, and inquiry. The nature of education must be to take that inclination and direct it toward valuable ends for society. As an example, he describes a cooking class which, through a series of questions by the teacher and students, ultimately leads to lessons in organic chemistry and experiments regarding the effects of heat on the protein in eggs.

The impulses of the children are described. They wish to communicate with others. They want to know the nature of things. They enjoy artistic expression and like to make things.

After describing a number of other activities from the laboratory school he comes to what he sees as the largest "stumbling block" that traditionalists have with these approaches: Stimulating inquiry and interest is fine, they say, but "how, upon this basis, shall the child get the needed information; how shall he undergo the required discipline?"

Dewey's short answer to that question is that the "needed information" and "required discipline" comes about in such settings—that inquiry for its own sake and the requirements of education are not at odds.

Dewey's longer answer (and his conclusion to the lecture) is that we are mistaken to think of the imagination of the child as a separate faculty. Imagination and learning cannot be at odds, because "Unless culture be a superficial polish, a veneering of mahogany over common wood, it surely is this -- the growth of the imagination in flexibility, in scope, and in sympathy, till the life which the individual lives is informed with the life of nature and of society."

=== Waste in Education ===
In the third lecture, Dewey takes on the issue of "waste in education" in a somewhat unusual mode. For Dewey, the primary waste in education is a waste of effort on the part of the school and time and effort on the part of the children. This waste, Dewey claims, is a result of isolation:

All waste is due to isolation. Organization is nothing but getting things into connection with one another, so that they work easily, flexibly, and fully. Therefore in speaking of this question of waste in education I desire to call your attention to the isolation of the various parts of the school system, to the lack of unity in the aims of education, to the lack of coherence in its studies and methods.

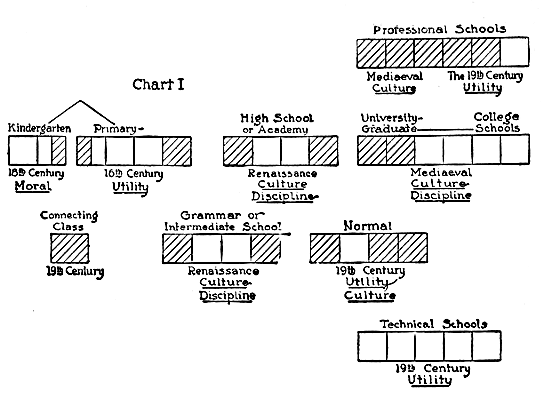
Dewey's chart of the development of education in history. From The School and Society, 1900.

The first isolation Dewey examines is the lack of connections between the stages of a child's school career. Kindergarten, he argues, comes out of Froebel's synthesis of observation of children's play with the early 19th century idealist symbolism of Schelling. It then becomes difficult to move students from kindergarten into the primary grades, which are organized around the practical concerns of the 16th century: reading and mathematics for commerce. From the primary school to the intermediate school there is another gap, with the intermediate school influenced by the grammar school of the Renaissance, an introduction into culture—at that time Latin and Greek, although in the 19th century other culture as well. Another gap exists between the intermediate school and the high school, which is largely a preparatory academy for entry into universities developed to meet medieval needs around professional study and cultural expansion.

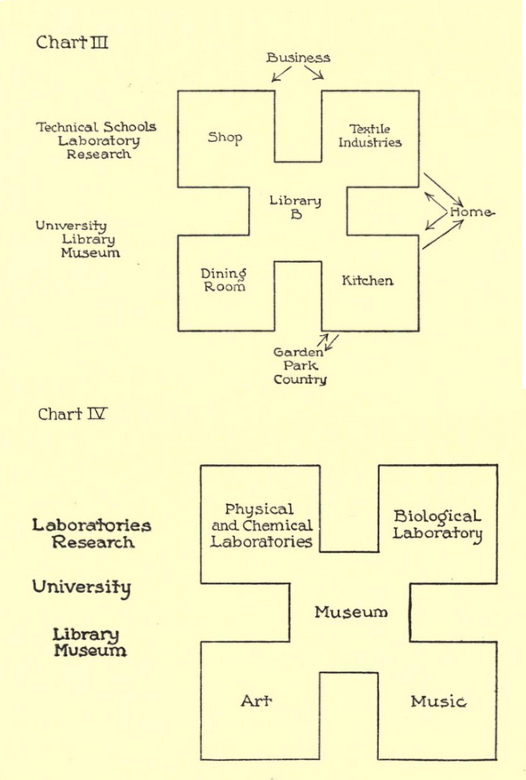
Dewey's conceptual design for a unified school.

While Dewey is careful to emphasize that these institutions have evolved over time, he notes that the patchwork nature of the sequence remains. The solution, according to Dewey, is to unify the sequence by connecting every part of the sequence to the world outside the school.

Dewey argues that the only way to unify the curriculum is to increase its connection to the world outside the classroom. Just as home and industry are not separate from the laboratories and research centers of the world, so the curriculum that finds its inspiration in the outside world can also be unified.

To illustrate this he provides a detailed description of a school building designed around the principle of these relationships. On the first floor the four corners represent practice, the machine shop, the textile industries, the dining room, and the kitchen. These are arrayed around the central library, illustrating always that the meaning of these activities are not the activities themselves, but the "theory of practical activities" which these activities help explicate. These activities are meaningful in the realm of the home and commerce to the individual, but they gain their social meaning from the collective knowledge of the center.

The second floor is similar, but more academic in focus. Arrayed around a central museum the art and music studios and the different libraries relate to one another, but also to the practical pursuits of the first floor. The textile needs of the first floor, for example, relate to the biological research of the second.

By relating school as a whole to life as a whole the various aims of the phases of education—the utility of the primary school, versus the culture and professional study of the high school—cease to pull in different directions. The growth of the child in "social capacity and service, his larger and more vital union with life, becomes the unifying aim" and the progression through disciplines merely phases of that growth.

== Additional chapters ==
The 1899 and 1900 editions included a fourth chapter on the activities of the Laboratory School, whereas the 1915 edition contained a number of articles that had been published in the Educational Record around the time of School and Society's release.

=== Three Years of the University Elementary School ===
A short report on the expenses and structure of the Laboratory School at the University of Chicago, originally a transcription of a talk given by Dewey at the Parent's Association of the school in February 1899. In it Dewey goes over everything from the expenses of the school to the organization of the grades.

Of particular note is Dewey's insistence that the school was not formed to test ready-made ideas, rather

the educational conduct of the school, as well as its administration, the selection of subject-matter, and the working out of the course of study, as well as actual instruction of children, have been almost entirely in the hands of the teachers of the school; and that there has been a gradual development of the educational principles and methods involved, not a fixed equipment. The teachers started with question marks, rather than with fixed rules, and if any answers have been reached, it is the teachers in the school who have supplied them.

He then details some of the questions they set out to address—mainly how the academic and symbolic disciplines should be conveyed to the child and how they can be made relevant to the home and community life of the child. After three years, he claims, the school is still a work in progress, yet "some of our original questions have secured affirmative answers."

=== The Psychology of Elementary Education ===
Dewey describes the way in which changes in our understanding of psychology should alter educational practice. He outlines some of the changes he has seen in psychology that should impact teaching practice:

- Newer psychology sees mental representation as socially constructed.
- Newer psychology sees cognition as activity-directed.
- Newer psychology sees the child's mind as different from the adult mind.

Dewey then details various ways that curriculum has come in line with these newer understandings, and in some cases anticipated them.

=== Froebel's Educational Principles ===
Dewey outlines Froebel's educational principles, explaining the places where the Laboratory School is in sympathy with Froebel's approach, but also critiquing Froebel's approach where they differ.

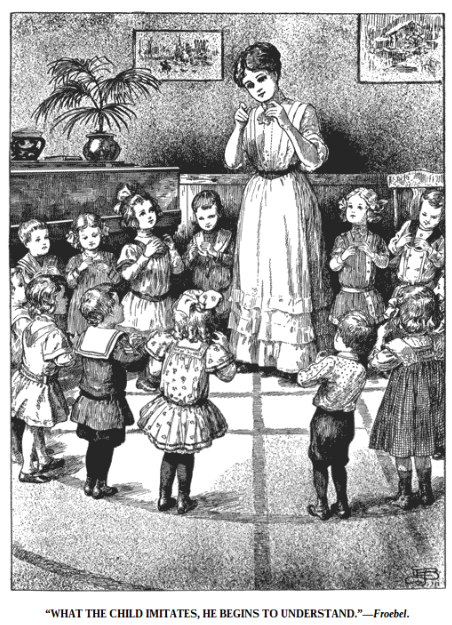
Drawing of Teacher Leading Children in "Finger Plays", one of the methods of imitation and abstraction preferred by Froebel.

His first critique is not so much of Froebel, but of those who follow Froebel as a system:

So far as occupations, games, etc., simply perpetuate those of Froebel and his earlier disciples, it may fairly be said that in many respects the presumption is against them...that in the worship of the external doings discussed by Froebel we have ceased to be loyal to his principle.

For Dewey, the teacher is a skilled professional who must always look to the particulars of the child and the environment when designing instruction; formulas cannot suffice.

His second critique is of Froebel's use of symbolism. This overreliance on symbolism as a guiding principle came about, says Dewey, because Froebel was operating without a scientific psychology, and because the nature of German culture of the time required to keep the culture of the Kindergarten apart from the rigid culture of the surrounding society. For Dewey, this emphasis on symbolism misunderstands the true imagination of the child which suffers from the abstraction and too-quick variety of Froebel's method.

A final critique is that of motivation. Dewey argues that while imitation is a powerful tool in education, it cannot be the sole motive of the child's learning. The child, if she is to learn anything, must have and own a conception of the why of the activity as well as the how. He concludes with a plea that the gap between methodologies in kindergarten and primary school be bridged, in the interest of a more productive and pedagogically consistent path for the child.

=== The Aim of History in Elementary Education ===
Originally published in Elementary School Record No. 8. Argues that "whatever history may be for the scientific historian, for the educator it must be an indirect sociology." By understanding the "motors" of history the child comes to understand the forces and organizations of her own time.

Dewey also details the methods in use in the laboratory school at the time. Key to the method is letting the students "live in the times", comprehending the challenges the people of that time faced, and endeavoring to discover solutions. As they compare their solutions with the solutions of the past, they understand the past a model for problem-solving in the present. Primary sources are privileged, and textbooks avoided. Above all, history is a tool of "social inquiry".

== Reception ==
The 1900 edition was warmly received and widely translated and published. The book had almost immediate popularity and influence, with three printings within its first year, comprising 7,500 copies between them.

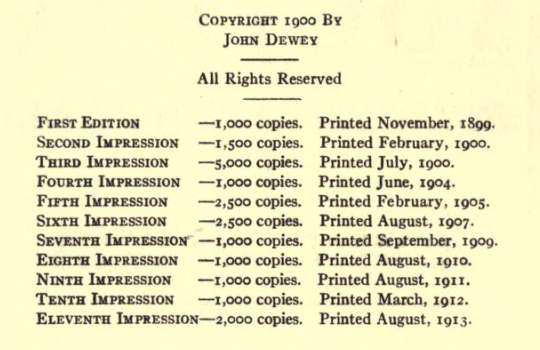
Impressions history from copyright page of late impression of 1900 edition.

By the time of the 1915 edition, the Elementary School Record went so far as to say:

It is given only to a few men to write educational classics. Since Spencer wrote his essays there has not been a more important contribution to educational reform than Dewey's School and Society.

== International influence ==
The School and Society was republished in Britain almost immediately, in 1900. Global influence followed; the book was read by proponents of progressive education worldwide.

The work was cited by Édouard Claparède who helped shape a progressive éducation nouvelle in Geneva, Switzerland, in the years leading up to the first world war. By 1920, Dewey and The School and Society were seen as "the authority for child development" by Claparède.

In Germany, the first chapter, on "School and Social Progress" was published in a journal in 1903. A German translation of the entire work followed in 1905. However, Dewey's work was distrusted by the elites in the monarchic and authoritarian German Empire, as it "built on interaction and cooperation, and therefore on democracy." Some ideas from The School and Society were embraced by monarchist educational reformers but stripped of all underlying democratic ideals because these reformers merely sought to tap into "the reserve of talents of the working class in order to serve the monarchy."

The work was translated into Russian, and may have influenced Pavel Blonsky and a young Lev Vygotsky. Dewey's ideas outlined in The School and Society appealed to the designers of early Soviet curricula but were generally denounced as incompatible with Soviet ideology, which saw schools as beholden to political goals, by the second half of the 1920s.

There is some disagreement on what language the book was first translated into. Thomas Popekewitz states the first translation was into Czech in 1904. Bonoso claims a Spanish version, translated by Domingo Barnés Salinas, appeared in Latin America as early as 1900. Hickman also credits Barnes with the first Spanish translation, but dates it at 1915, and gives Japan the distinction of having the first translation in 1901.

All in all, the book was translated into a dozen languages.
