= The Seven Little Sisters Who Live on the Round Ball That Floats in the Air =

1861 book for children by Jane Andrews

- Author: Jane Andrews
- Language: English
- Subject: social geography
- Genre: children's literature
- Publisher: Ticknor and Fields, Ginn and Company
- Publication date: 1861
- Publication place: Boston
- Followed by: Each and All: Seven Little Sisters Prove Their Sisterhood

The Seven Little Sisters Who Live on the Round Ball That Floats in the Air (1861) is the first book by the American writer Jane Andrews (1833–1887). It is a book of stories about girls living in different countries, and was intended to teach children about geography. There were editions across 63 years, from 1861 to the 1920s.

== Publication ==
The book was published by Ticknor and Fields in 1861. New editions were published into the 1920s, and the book was recommended into the 1930s. It is said to have "paid royalties for ninety years".

== Contents ==
The book was described by its British publisher as "Illustrat[ing] the Manners, Customs and Child-life of the Seven Races of Mankind".

The book's chapters are:

- The Ball Itself
- The Little Brown Baby Agoonack
- The Esquimau Sister
- How Agoonack Lives through the Long Summer
- Gemila, the Child of the Desert
- The Little Mountain Maiden (Switzerland)
- The Story of Pen-Se (China)
- The Little Dark Girl (Africa)
- Louise, the Child of the Beautiful River Rhine
- Louise, the Child of the Western Forest (the Western United States)
- The Seven Little Sisters

Andrews imagines that the child to whom she is telling the story objects: '"How can they be sisters when some are black, some brown, and some white; when one lives in the warm country and another in the cold, and Louise upon the shores of the Rhine? Sallie and I are sisters, because we have the same father and live here together in the same house by the seaside; but as for those seven children, I can't believe them to be sisters at all"'. Andrews replies that all the children have the same father, God the Father: "Don't you see that they must all be his children, and so all sisters, and that he is your Father, too, who makes the mayflowers bloom, and the violets cover the hills, and turns the white blossoms into black, sweet berries in the autumn? It is your dear and kind Father who does all this for his children. He has very many children; some of them live in houses and some in tents, some in little huts and some under the trees, in the warm countries and in the cold. And he loves them all; they are his children, and they are brothers and sisters. Shall they not love each other?".

Andrews published a sequel, Each and All: Seven Little Sisters Prove Their Sisterhood, in 1877.

Later editions of The Seven Little Sisters had an introduction about Andrews by her friend Louisa Parsons Hopkins, written in 1887. Hopkins quotes Andrews saying that the children taught and to whom she told the stories '"seemed to care so much for them, that I thought if they were put into a book other children might care for them too, and they might possibly do some good in the world"'. The friends to whom she read the manuscript were critical of the length of the title, but Andrews "wish[ed] to get the idea of the unity of the world into it as the main idea of the book".

== Reception ==
The book was used in the Boston Kindergarten as a textbook.

On publication, The Christian World magazine wrote of the book "It has only one illustration; but is a highly romantic story, and is well calculated to engender loving sentiments towards all mankind". The British Standard said of it that "The volume is full of ingenuity, incident, life, and beauty. There is no inconsiderable genius displayed in mapping the work as well as in filling it up. The book cannot fail to be very popular". The North American Review said that "The little book was conceived in a happy hour ; its pictures are so real and so graphic, so warm and so human, that the most literal and the most imaginative of children must find in them, not only something to charm, but also to mould pleasant associations for maturer years".

Thomas Wentworth Higginson, writing in the Ladies' Home Journal in 1894, chose the book as one of ten that should be given to girls as the basis of a library. The Journal of Education, reflecting on Higginson's list, called it "a book which has for the first time brought it home to multitudes of young people that they are the citizens, not merely of a nation, but of a planet". In 1896, Seven Little Sisters was the book selected by the South Dakota Reading Circle as its third grade read. In 1896, it was recommended in The Intelligence, an education journal, as a book every primary geography teacher should own and read.

In 1931, Seven Little Sisters was described in the Shrewsbury Chronicle as "that charming little book ... In it you will find stories of how the little girls from other countries spend their happy days. You will see pictures of the little Swiss girl, the Norwegian [there is no Norwegian child in the book], the Southern child, the little Esquimaux, like round bundles of fur, and other attractive little girls, which make seven in all. You will learn how they play, what kind of houses they live in, what their mothers cook for their dinners and so on."

The book was identified in 1973 as being negative about the physical appearance of the African children, the "Little Dark Girl" and her brother and sister. Laureen Tedesco, writing in 2024, says that "Although Andrews's racial essentializing seems glaringly obvious to present-day readers, European-descended teachers and writers of her day found her approach - shaped by a geography pedagogy that communicated only big-picture contrasts to the youngest readers - progressive". Tedesco notes that the picture of the "Little Brown Baby" in the 1861 edition shows a darker skin than the 1902 edition.
