= Eric Delson =

American paleoanthropologist (born 1945)

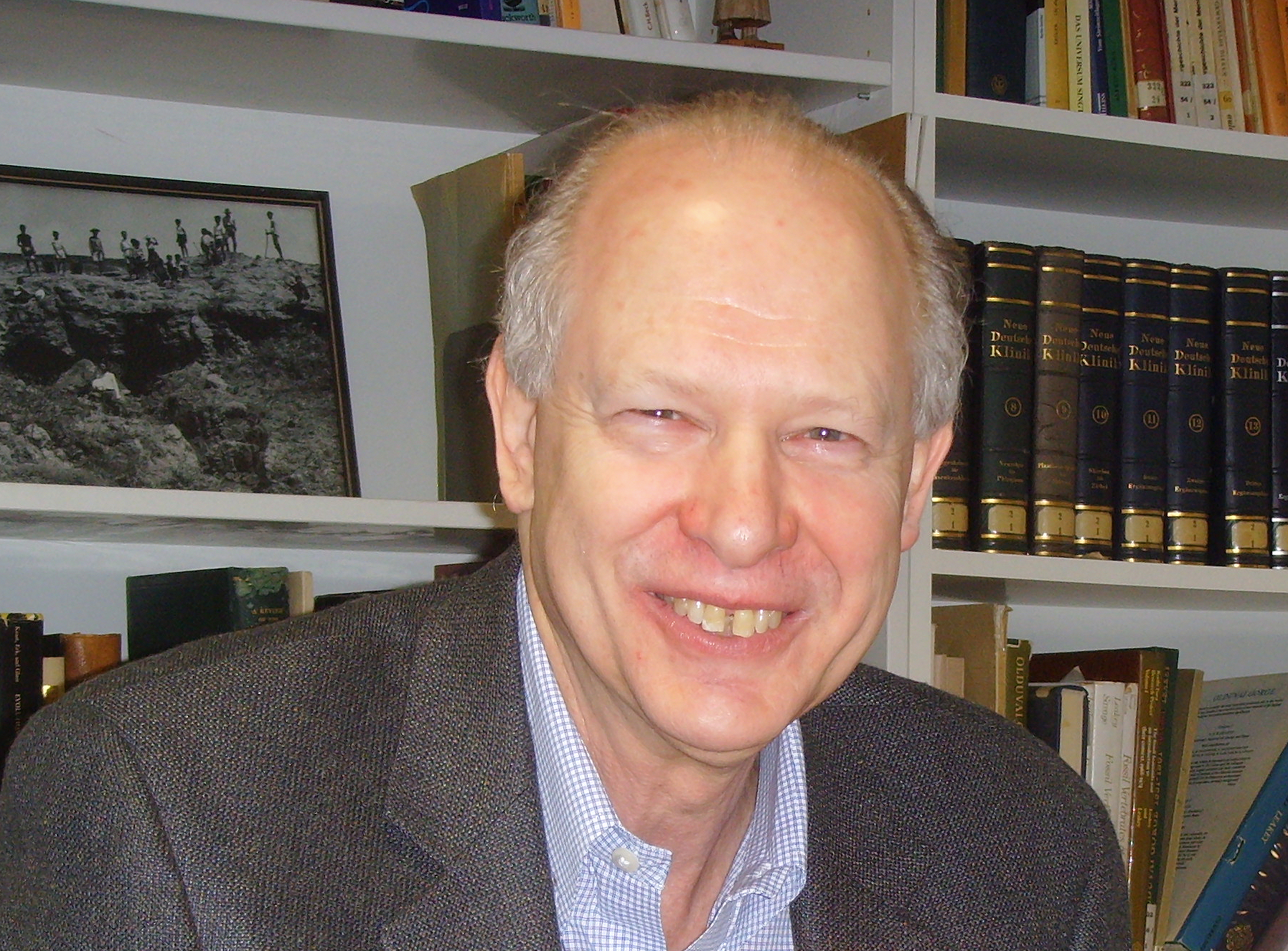
- Eric Delson in 2011
- Born: 1945 (age 80–81); New York City, U.S.
- Education: Harvard College; Columbia University
- Known for: Research on primate evolution and human evolutionary history
- Scientific career
- Fields: Paleoanthropology, vertebrate paleontology, evolutionary biology
- Workplaces: Lehman College, City University of New York, American Museum of Natural History
- Thesis: Fossil colobine monkeys of the Circum-Mediterranean region and the evolutionary history of the Cercopithecidae (Primates, Mammalia) (1973)
- Doctoral advisor: Malcolm McKenna

Eric Delson (born 1945) is an American geologist and paleoanthropologist whose research focuses particularly on the evolution of Old World monkeys, especially the Cercopithecidae, and on human evolution. He became a professor of anthropology at Lehman College of the City University of New York (CUNY) in 1980. In the early 21st century, Delson became a leading researcher in the development of computer-assisted methods for the three-dimensional analysis, reconstruction, and visualization of hominin fossils.

== Education and academic career ==
Delson received a bachelor's degree in physics from Harvard College in 1966 and a doctorate in vertebrate paleontology from Columbia University in 1973. During 1972–1973, he held a teaching appointment in anthropology at the University of Pittsburgh. In 1973, he joined Lehman College and the CUNY Graduate School as a lecturer in anthropology, becoming a professor in 1980. From 1975, he also worked in the vertebrate paleontology department of the American Museum of Natural History in New York City.

== Research ==
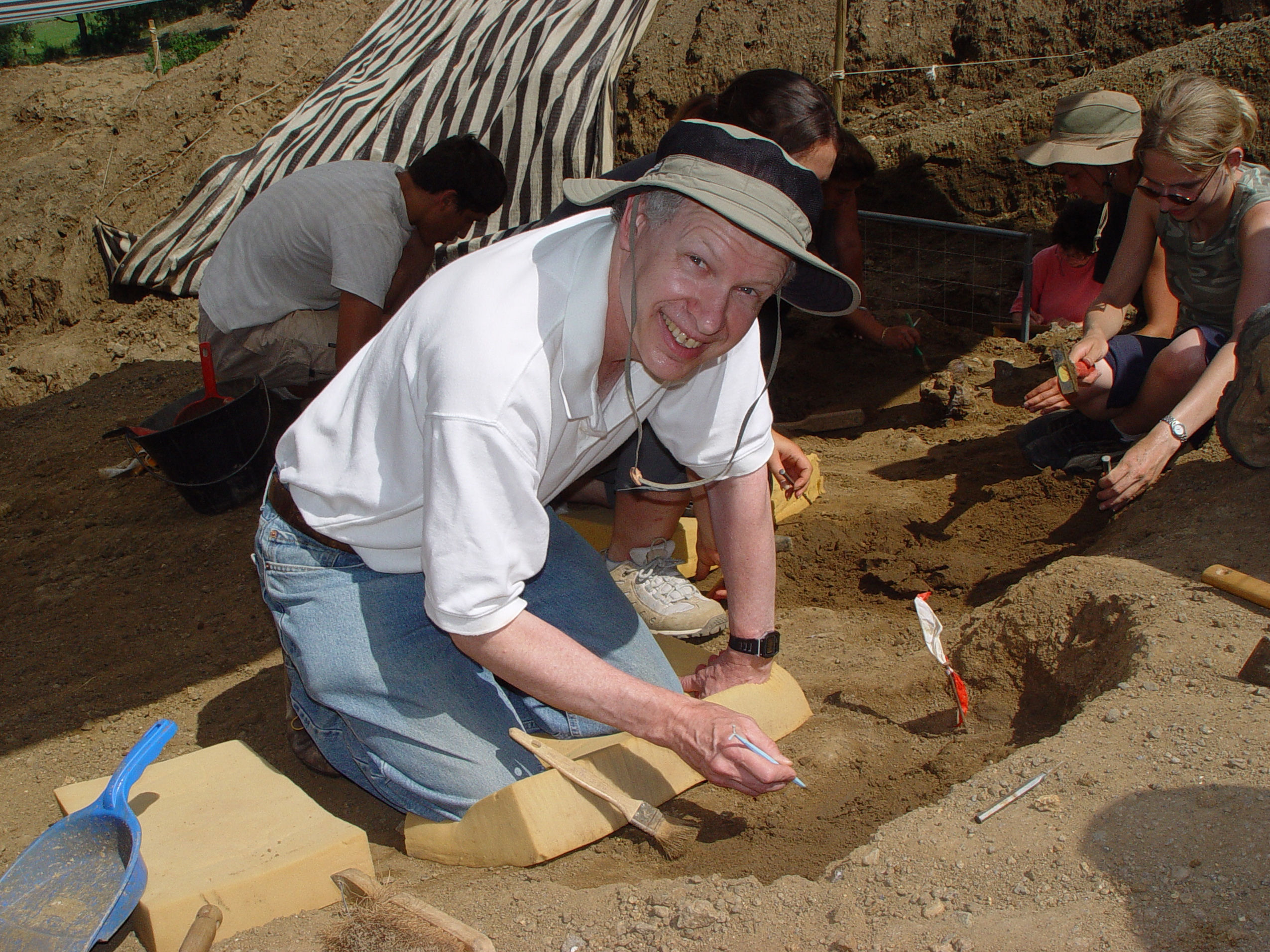
Delson at excavations in Senèze, July 2006

Delson studied the evolutionary relationships of fossil and living Old World monkeys in his doctoral dissertation, Fossil colobine monkeys of the Circum-Mediterranean region and the evolutionary history of the Cercopithecidae (Primates, Mammalia), completed at Columbia University in 1973. This research contributed to his 1979 book with Frederick S. Szalay, Evolutionary History of the Primates. A 1980 review described the book as the most extensive overview of primate fossils available at the time. In 2011, Delson's publications on primate evolutionary history were described as works that continued to be regarded as standard references.

In 1984, Delson helped organize a scientific symposium and the public exhibition Ancestors: Four Million Years of Humanity in New York City. The exhibition brought together original fossils of early Hominini for direct comparison, making a broad collection of significant specimens accessible in one place. The symposium proceedings were published in 1985 in the volume Ancestors: The Hard Evidence.

Another major reference work associated with Delson is the Encyclopedia of Human Evolution and Prehistory, first published in 1988 and later revised. Delson co-edited the second edition with Ian Tattersall and other contributors, published in 1999. The encyclopedia brought together research on human evolution, Paleolithic archaeology, Cenozoic geology, geochronology, and paleontology. In 2004, Delson and Ross MacPhee established the Springer book series Vertebrate Paleobiology and Paleoanthropology.

From 2000 to 2007, Delson worked with French colleagues on excavations at Senèze, a fossil site near Brioude in the Haute-Loire department of France. The site is known for its Pliocene mammal fossils and had been recognized since 1892, but its fossil deposits had not been dated using modern methods before the renewed investigations. The project sought to obtain new specimens and improve understanding of the site's age, paleoenvironment, and fossil fauna.

Delson also collaborated with researchers at the University of California, Davis and Stony Brook University to develop methods for analyzing the three-dimensional morphology of fossil primates. These methods use morphometric data to reconstruct skull shapes computationally and investigate the possible morphology of evolutionary intermediates. Delson helped develop PRIMO (PRImate Morphometrics Online), an online database of primate morphometric data collected by his research groups and collaborators.

From 1986 to 1989, Delson co-edited the Journal of Human Evolution with Peter Andrews. During this period, the journal became a leading publication in paleoanthropology. Delson was a founding member of the Paleoanthropology Society and served as its secretary from 1999 through 2013. He became a fellow of the American Association for the Advancement of Science in 2002.

Delson has been associated with a number of scientific organizations, including the American Association of Physical Anthropologists (now the American Association of Biological Anthropologists), the Paleontological Society, the Society for the Study of Mammalian Evolution, the Society for the Study of Evolution, the American Anthropological Association, the Society of Vertebrate Paleontology, the Society for Systematic Biology, the American Association for Zoological Nomenclature, and Sigma Xi.

== Taxonomic work ==
Delson was the author of the original description of Prohylobates simonsi and a co-author of the original description of Dryopithecus wuduensis.

== Selected publications ==
- Evolutionary History of the Primates (with Frederick S. Szalay, 1979).
- Ancestors: The Hard Evidence (editor, 1985).
- Encyclopedia of Human Evolution and Prehistory (co-editor, second edition, 1999).
