= Paul Andrew =

Paul Andrew may refer to:

- Paul Andrew (rugby union) (born 1989), Cornish rugby union player
- Paul Andrew (designer) (fl. 1990s–2010s), English fashion designer

== See also ==
- Paul Andreu (1938–2018), French architect
- Paul Andrews (disambiguation)
