= Morissette =

Morissette may refer to:

- Morissette (singer) (born 1996), a Filipina singer, songwriter, and actress
  - Morissette (album), the debut album by Morissette
- Morissette (surname), people with the name
  - Alanis Morissette (born 1974), a Canadian and American singer-songwriter, producer and actress
- Morissette v. United States, a 1952 U.S. Supreme Court case concerning criminal intent

== See also ==
- Morisset (disambiguation)
- Morrissette (disambiguation)
- Chateau Morrisette Winery, a winery in Virginia, United States
