= Fred Andrews =

Fred Andrews may refer to:

- Fred Andrews (rugby union) (1864–1929), Welsh rugby union player
- Fred Henry Andrews (1866–1957), British artist and scholar
- Fred Andrews (baseball) (1952–2021), American baseball player
- Frederick Cyrus Andrews (1902–1988), British writer on and for radio
- Frederick Andrews (cricketer) (1905–1983), New Zealand cricketer
- Fred Andrews (Archie Comics), a fictional character in Archie Comics

== See also ==
- Frederick Andrew (1940–2007), British biathlete
- Sir Frederick William Andrewes (1859–1932), English physician, pathologist, and bacteriologist
