= Joseph Andrew =

Joseph or Joe Andrew may refer to:

- Joe Andrew (born 1960), American politician and lawyer, national chairman of the Democratic National Committee
- Joe Andrew (academic) (born 1948), Keele University professor
- Joe Andrew (footballer) (1889–1982), Australian rules footballer

== See also ==
- Joseph Andrews (disambiguation)
- Joey Andrews, American politician from Michigan
