= Francis Andrews (disambiguation) =

Francis Andrews may refer to:

- Francis Andrews (1718–1774), Irish politician
- Sir Francis Andrews, 4th Baronet (died 1759) of the Andrews baronets
- Francis Andrews (settler), see History of Hartford, Connecticut
- Francis Andrews, character in the novel The Man Within

== See also ==
- Frank Andrews (disambiguation)
