= Andrew Keith =

Andrew Keith may refer to:

- J. Andrew Keith (1958–1999), American author and games developer
- Andrew Keith, Lord Dingwall (died 1606), Scottish landowner, soldier, and diplomat
- Andrew Keith (courtier) (fl. 1613), Scottish courtier
- A. Paul Keith (1875–1918), American theater owner

== See also ==
- Keith Andrews (disambiguation)
