= Charles Andrews =

Charles Andrews may refer to:

- Charles Andrews (Maine politician) (1814–1852), U.S. representative from Maine
- Charles Andrews (New York judge) (1827–1918), chief judge of the NY Court of Appeals 1881–1882 and 1893–1897 and mayor of Syracuse, New York
- Charles Andrews (organist), British organist
- Charles B. Andrews (1834–1902), governor of Connecticut
- Charles Freer Andrews (1871–1940), English priest who worked with Mohandas Gandhi
- Charles McLean Andrews (1863–1943), American historian
- Charles O. Andrews (1877–1946), U.S. senator from Florida
- Charles O. Andrews Jr. (1910–1969), his son, American politician and judge in Florida
- Charles William Andrews (1866–1924), British palaeontologist
- Charles Andrews (Victorian politician) (1834–1895), Australian member of Victorian Parliament between 1880 and 1894
- Charles Leonard Andrews (1861–1914), Australian member of Victorian Parliament between 1900 and 1904
- Charles Sperry Andrews III (1917–2005), American landscape painter and educator

== See also ==
- Charles Andrew (1793–1855), English cricketer
- Charlie Andrew (born 1980), British record producer
- Charlie Andrews (Heroes), fictional character in TV program, Heroes
