= Morrissette =

Morrissette may refer to:

- Brian Morrissette (born 1956), United States Virgin Islands athlete
- Gabriel Morrissette (born 1959), Canadian illustrator
- Richard Morrissette (1956–2025), American politician

== See also ==
- Morissette (disambiguation)
- Morisset (disambiguation)
- Chateau Morrisette Winery, a winery in Virginia, United States
