= Morissette (surname) =

Morissette is a surname. Notable people with the surname include:

- Alanis Morissette (born 1974), a Canadian singer-songwriter
- Catherine Morissette (born 1979), a Canadian politician and lawyer
- Claire Morissette (1950–2007), a Canadian cycling advocate
- Cody Morissette (born 2000), an American baseball player
- Dave Morissette (born 1971), a Canadian professional ice hockey forward
- Émilien Morissette (1927–?), a Canadian politician
- Guillaume Morissette (born 1984), a Canadian fiction writer and poet
- Jean-Guy Morissette (1937–2011), a Canadian professional ice hockey goaltender
- Pierre Morissette (born 1944), a Canadian Roman Catholic bishop

== See also ==
- Morisset (disambiguation)
- Bill Morrisette (1931–2025), an American politician from Oregon
- Bill Morrisette (baseball) (1894–1966), an American baseball pitcher
- Bill Morrisette, an American guitarist with the band Dillinger Four
- Gabriel Morrissette (born 1959), a Canadian illustrator
