= Mary Andrews =

Mary Andrews may refer to:

- Mary Andrews (geologist) (1854–1914), Northern Irish geologist
- Mary Raymond Shipman Andrews (1860–1936), American writer
- Mary Andrews (politician), American politician from Maine
- Mary Kay Andrews (born 1954), author based in Atlanta
- Mary Garard Andrews (1852–1936), Universalist minister
- Mary Maria Andrews (1915–1996), Anglican deaconess, missionary and church leader
- Mary Andrews, fictional character in the comic strip Archie's Gang
