= Sydney Mary Thompson =

Irish geologist, scientific illustrator, photographer and author

- Born: 1847; Whitehouse, County Antrim, Ireland
- Died: 16 July 1923 (aged 75–76); Llandudno, Wales
- Other names: Madame Christen
- Known for: Geology, botany, art
- Spouse: Rodolphe Christen (m. 1900)

Sydney Mary Thompson (also known as Madame Christen; 1847 – 16 July 1923) was an Irish geologist, botanist and artist.

== Background and family life ==
Thompson was born in Whitehouse, County Antrim, the daughter of James Thompson, a Belfast linen merchant. Her uncle was the naturalist William Thompson. She described her childhood as "amphibious"; her family home was at Macedon Point and she frequently explored the coastline with her brother in a small boat. She spent three years in Dresden, Germany, then studied art at the Belfast Government School of Art, beginning in 1870, and later in London.

In 1900, she married Swiss artist Rodolphe Christen. The couple later moved to Scotland.

== Geology ==
An active member of the Belfast Naturalists' Club, Thompson organised lectures and practicals, showing a particular interest in stratigraphy and petrography. Her original fieldwork mostly concerned sources of material in the glacial deposits of northern Ireland.

She was a friend and collaborator of northern Irish geologist Mary Andrews, and together they worked on glacial erratics, collecting samples, mapping and naming erratics with the aim of finding out the direction of ice flow in Ulster. As the secretary of the Belfast Field Club, her reports were published in the club's Proceedings.

In 1894, Thompson was elected to the Glacialists' Association.

Some time between 1907 and 1910, Thompson discovered a piece of Ailsa Craig microgranite at Moys, near Limavady, County Londonderry. The granite erratic showed the westernmost extent of the Irish Sea Glacier, as it had been carried south by the glacier from Scotland and its incorporation into glacial sediments allowed the route of the glacier to be mapped. Thompson's discovery placed the western limit of the glacier 20 miles (32 km) further west than its previous designation.

== Art ==
Thompson won many prizes for her art, and was a member of the Belfast Ramblers' Sketching Club and the Belfast Art Society, of which she became patron in 1921.

== Death ==
Madame Christen passed of heart failure at Llandudno in July, 1923.

== Bibliography ==
SM Thompson

- "A Plea for Irish Glaciology", Irish Naturalist, vol. iii, 1894, p 30.
- "The Belfast Field Club Donegal", Irish Naturalist, vol iii, 1894, p 226.
- "Geology (of Co. Galway)", Irish Naturalist, vol iv, 1895, p 225.
- "Glacial Geology of Kerry" (note on): Irish Naturalist, vol viii, 1899, p 61.
- "The Supposed Occurrence of White Lias at Macedon Pt.", Irish Naturalist, vol ix, 1900, p 154.

Madame Christen

- "Investigations into the Glacial Drifts of the Northeast of Ireland", Irish Naturalist, vol xi, 1902, p 275.
- "A summary of the [BNF] Club's recent Glacial Work", Irish Naturalist, vol xv, 1906, p 80.
