= Andrewes =

Andrewes is a surname, and may refer to:

- Antony Andrewes (1910–1990), British classical scholar and historian
- Sir Christopher Andrewes (1896–1988), British virologist
- Sir Frederick William Andrewes (1859–1932), British physician and bacteriologist
- Gerrard Andrewes (1750–1825), English churchman, Dean of Canterbury from 1809
- Herbert Edward Andrewes (1863–1950), British entomologist
- Lancelot Andrewes (1555–1626), English bishop and theologian
- Philip Andrewes (born 1941), Canadian politician
- Roger Andrewes (1574–1635), English clergyman and scholar, brother of Lancelot
- Sir Thomas Andrewes (died 1659), London financier who supported the parliamentary cause during the English Civil Wars
- Sir William Andrewes (1899–1974), British admiral

== See also ==
- Andrewe
- Andrews (disambiguation)
