= Phil Andrews =

Phil or Philip Andrews may refer to:

- Phil Andrews (racing driver) (born 1966), British racing driver
- Phil Andrews (footballer) (born 1976), English footballer
- Phil Andrews (politician) (born 1959), member of Montgomery County Council, Maryland
- Philip Andrews (economist) (1914–1971), British industrial economist
- Philip Andrews (admiral) (1866–1935), United States Navy officer
