= Morrissey (disambiguation) =

Morrissey, born Steven Patrick Morrissey, English singer-songwriter and former lead singer of The Smiths

Morrissey may also refer to:

- Morrissey (surname)

== Other uses ==
- Morrissey–Mullen, British jazz-rock fusion band
- Effie M. Morrissey, 1890s American schooner
- Morrissey Hearing, legal proceeding, much less formal than a trial, used in the United States to handle parole violations
- Morrissey Hall (University of Notre Dame)
- Morrissey Provincial Park, British Columbia

== See also ==
- Morisset (disambiguation)
