= David Andrews =

David Andrews may refer to:

== Entertainment ==
- David Andrews (actor) (born 1952), American actor
- David Andrews (director) (1935–2026), British actor and television director
- David Andrews, Jr. (born 1966), Irish comedian known by the pseudonym David McSavage
- Dave Andrews (activist) (born 1951), Australian Christian author and speaker
- Dave Andrews (musician) (born 1972), English musician and composer of film music

== Sports ==
- David Andrews (American football) (born 1992), American center for the New England Patriots
- David Andrews (ice hockey) (born 1948), former president and CEO, American Hockey League
- David Andrews (racing driver) (born 1939), British former racing driver

== Other ==
- A. David Andrews (born 1933), English astronomer
- David Andrews (diplomat) (born 1952), Australian diplomat and writer under the pseudonym David Morriset
- David Andrews (politician) (1935–2026), Irish Fianna Fáil politician and barrister
- David L. Andrews (born 1952), British scientist and former president of SPIE
- David W. Andrews, American academic and president of National University

== See also ==
- David Andrew (1867–1928), Australian politician
