= Arthur Andrew (disambiguation) =

Arthur Andrew (1915–1994) is a Canadian diplomat.

Arthur Andrew may also refer to:

- Arthur Lynch fitz Andrew, Mayor of Galway

== See also ==
- Arthur Andrews (disambiguation)
