= Morisset (disambiguation) =

Morisset is a commercial centre and suburb of the City of Lake Macquarie in New South Wales, Australia.

Morisset may also refer to:

- Alfred Morisset (1874–1952), Canadian politician
- David Morisset (disambiguation)
- Edric Norfolk Vaux Morisset (1830–1887), colonial police officer
- James Morisset (1780–1852), penal administrator
- Jean-Marie Morisset (born 1947), French politician
- Pierre Morisset (born 1943), Canadian surgeon
- Renée Morisset, (1928–2009), Canadian pianist

== See also ==
- Prix Gérard-Morisset
- Morrissette (disambiguation)
- Morissette (disambiguation)
- Morrissey (disambiguation)
