= David Morisset =

David Morisset may refer to:

- David Morisset (ice hockey) (born 1981), former NHL player
- The pen name of David Andrews
