= Thomas Andrews (scientist) =

Irish chemist and physicist (1813–1885)

Thomas Andrews FRS FRSE
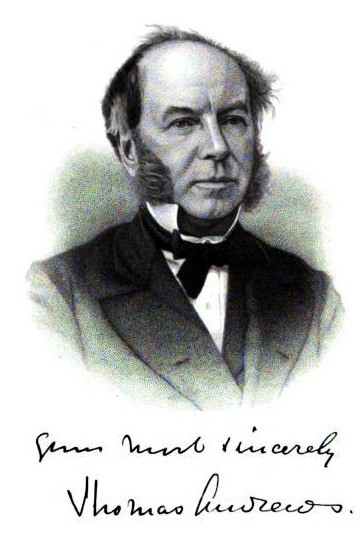
- Born: 19 December 1813; Belfast, Ireland
- Died: 26 November 1885 (aged 71); Belfast, Ireland
- Education: University of Glasgow
- Known for: Phase transitions
- Awards: Royal Medal (1844)
- Scientific career
- Fields: Chemistry; Physics

Thomas Andrews FRS FRSE (19 December 1813 – 26 November 1885) was an Irish chemist and physicist who did important work on phase transitions between gases and liquids. He was a longtime professor of chemistry at Queen's University of Belfast.

== Life ==
Andrews was born in Belfast, Ireland, where his father was a linen merchant. He attended the Belfast Academy and the Royal Belfast Academical Institution, where at the latter of which he studied mathematics under James Thomson. In 1828 he went to the University of Glasgow to study chemistry under Professor Thomas Thomson, then studied at Trinity College, Dublin, where he gained distinction in classics as well as in science. Finally, at University of Edinburgh in 1835, he was awarded a doctorate in medicine.

Andrews began a successful medical practice in his native Belfast in 1835, also giving instruction in chemistry at the Academical Institution. In 1845 he was appointed vice-president of the newly established Queen's University of Belfast, and professor of chemistry there. He held these two offices until his retirement in 1879 at age 66. He died in 1885, and was buried in the Borough Cemetery in Belfast.

In 1842, Andrews married Jane Hardie Walker (1818–1899). They had six children, including the geologist Mary Andrews.

== Work ==
Andrews first became known as a scientific investigator with his work on the heat developed in chemical actions, for which the Royal Society awarded him a Royal Medal in 1844. Another important investigation, undertaken in collaboration with Peter Guthrie Tait, was devoted to ozone.

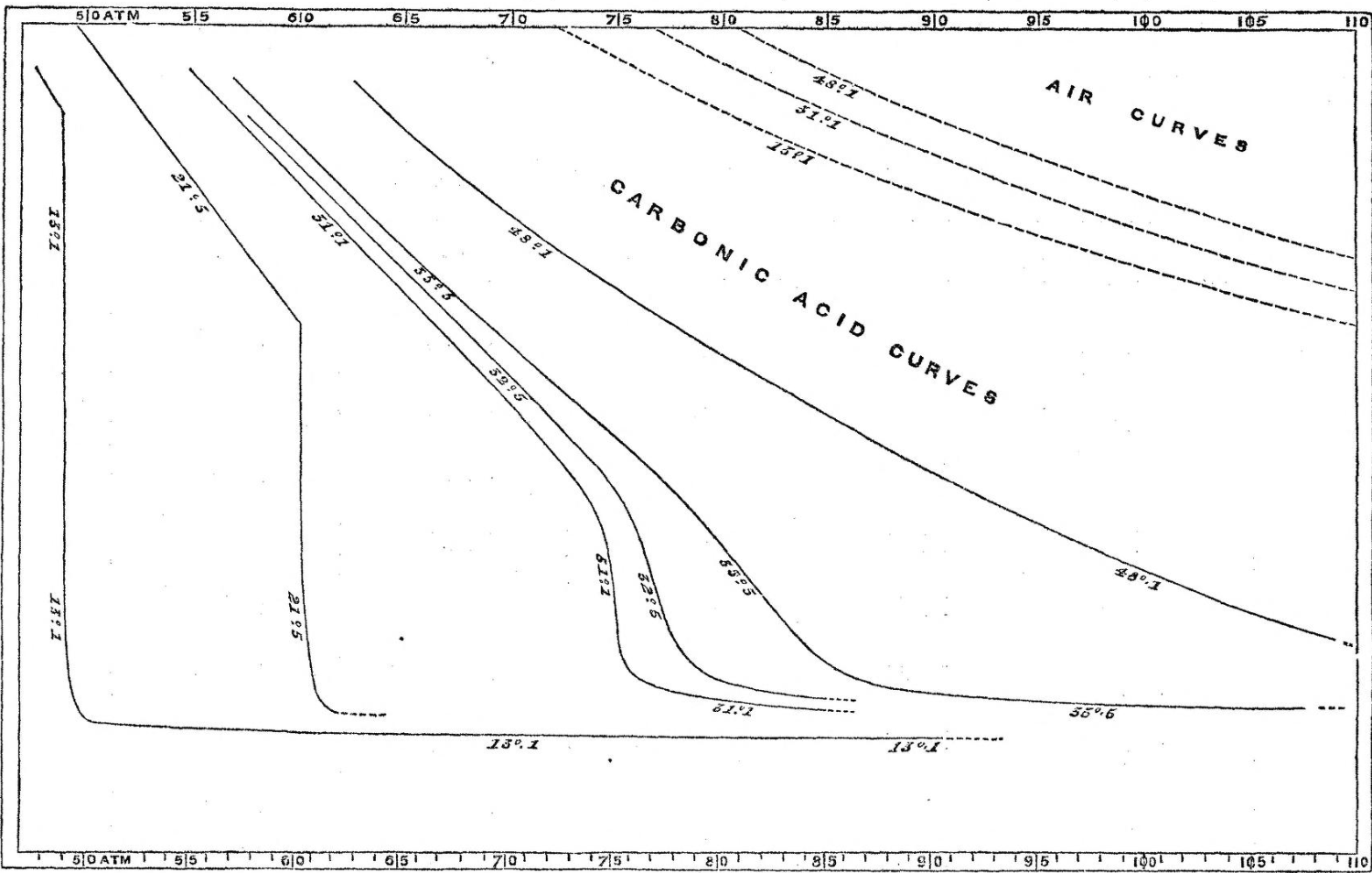
The pV diagram of carbon dioxide. Andrews estimated that the critical point of carbon dioxide is around 30.92 C (modern value is 30.98 C). Note that unlike modern conventions, this diagram shows pressure on the x-axis and volume on the y-axis.

His reputation mainly rests on his work with liquefaction of gases. In the 1860s he carried out a very complete inquiry into the gas laws—expressing the relations of pressure, temperature, and volume in carbon dioxide. In particular, he established the concepts of critical temperature and critical pressure, showing that a substance passes from vapor to liquid state without any breach of continuity. He concluded that

... the gaseous and liquid states are only distant stages of the same condition of matter, and are capable of passing into one another by a process of continuous change.

In Andrews' experiments on phase transitions, he showed that carbon dioxide may be carried from any of the states we usually call liquid to any of those we usually call gas, without losing homogeneity. The mathematical physicist Willard Gibbs cited these results in support of the Gibbs free energy equation. They also set off a race among researchers to liquify various other gases. In 1877-78 Louis Paul Cailletet was the first to liquefy oxygen.

== Selected writings ==
- Thomas Andrews, "The Bakerian Lecture: On the Continuity of the Gaseous and Liquid States of Matter", Philosophical Transactions of the Royal Society of London, vol. 159 (1869), pp. 575–590.
- Tait, P. G.; Crum Brown, A. (1889). The Scientific Papers of the Late Thomas Andrews. London and New York: Macmillan and Company. - Contains a biographical memoir of Andrews by Tait and Crum Brown
