= Frederick Andrews (cricketer) =

New Zealand cricketer

Personal information
- Full name: Frederick Maxwell Andrews
- Born: 10 July 1905; Auckland, New Zealand
- Died: 10 August 1983 (aged 78); Auckland, New Zealand
- Batting: Right-handed
- Bowling: Right-arm medium

Domestic team information
- Years: Team
- 1935/36–1940/41: Auckland
- 1941/42: Wellington
- Source: ESPNcricinfo, 1 June 2016

Frederick Maxwell Andrews (10 July 1905 – 10 August 1983) was a New Zealand cricketer. He played first-class cricket for Auckland and Wellington between 1935 and 1943.
