= Phil Andrews (footballer) =

English footballer (born 1976)

Personal information
- Full name: Philip Donald Andrews
- Date of birth: 14 September 1976 (age 50)
- Place of birth: Andover, England
- Height: 5 ft 11 in (1.80 m)
- Position: Forward

Youth career
- Basingstoke Town
- Fleet Town
- 1993–1994: Brighton & Hove Albion

Senior career*
Years	Team	Apps	(Gls)
1994–1997	Brighton & Hove Albion	25	(1)
1997–2001	Bashley		
2001–200?	Dorchester Town		
200?–2003	Weymouth		
200?–2008	Andover		
2008–20??	Amesbury Town		
- * Club domestic league appearances and goals

Philip Donald Andrews (born 14 September 1976) is an English former professional footballer who played as a forward in the Football League for Brighton & Hove Albion.

== Life and career ==
Andrews was born in Andover, Hampshire, in 1976. He played youth football for Basingstoke Town and Fleet Town before joining Brighton & Hove Albion as a trainee in 1993. He made his senior debut in April 1994 in a Second Division match away to Cambridge United. He turned professional a year later, but never established himself as a first-team player. Of his 36 appearances, all but 5 were as a substitute. He was released at the end of the 1996–97 season, and signed for Bashley of the Southern League, where he spent four years. He later played for clubs including Dorchester Town, Weymouth, Andover and Amesbury Town.
