= Oscar Andrews =

Irish cricketer and field hockey player

Cricket information
- Batting: Right-handed
- Bowling: Right-arm medium

International information
- National side: Ireland

Career statistics
Competition	First-class
Matches	6
Runs scored	94
Batting average	10.44
100s/50s	0/0
Top score	29*
Balls bowled	168
Wickets	4
Bowling average	23.50
5 wickets in innings	0
10 wickets in match	0
Best bowling	2/8
Catches/stumpings	6/–
- Source: Cricket Archive, 27 May 2021

Oscar Andrews (24 July 1876 – 30 October 1956) was an Irish cricket and field hockey player. When playing cricket he was a right-handed batsman and a right-arm medium pace bowler.

He made his debut for Irish cricket team in their first first-class match against London County in May 1902, and went on to play for them seven times, his last game coming against Philadelphia in September 1909. His cousin also played for Ireland.

Whilst he did not again feature for the Irish national side, he was seen to play for an Ulster side against the touring Indian cricket team in 1911 and for a North of Ireland side against Wales in 1924. He also played for the Ireland national field hockey team in 1899. His field hockey career was marked by playing in the first club match in Ulster in November 1896 in which he scored six goals.
