= Kelly Andrews =

Kelly Andrews may refer to:

- Kelly Andrews (politician), co-chair of the Green Party in Northern Ireland 2005–2009
- Kelly Andrews (The Young and the Restless), fictional character on the CBS daytime soap opera The Young and the Restless, 2013–2015
