= Garry Andrews =

Australian artist

Garry Andrews (born 1957) is an Australian contemporary artist.

== Life and work ==
Andrews was born in Sydney. He was awarded his Master of Arts in Visual Arts from Griffith University in 2005. Andrews' work is primarily expressionist in style and his large paintings, mixed-media drawings and prints are represented in private, public and corporate collections in Australia and overseas. Collections include National Gallery of Australia, Faber-Castell International Collection, Griffith University, James Cook University and Perc Tucker Regional Gallery, Townsville; Andrews also has achieved a national profile for public art and murals which include the ABC Greentrain:Finding Common Ground of 1991, Harbourside Marketplace murals and Oceania fountain sculpture, Ultimo, Sydney when working with Public Art Squad 1986–1988, and the controversial mural depicting a tropical version of Michelangelo's David sculpture which Andrews painted for the Cairns Regional Gallery. Garry Andrews taught at the Cairns Tafe College (now TNQIT) in the ATSI program from 1983 to 1986 and 1990. He was responsible for writing the innovative screenprinting curriculum for the ATSI Art course.

His Greentrain mural: was the subject of an ABC Television documentary "Greentrain Art" produced by Henry Prokopf, ABC Television, 1991. Also in 1991 Andrews coordinated the painting of the Brisbane ferry "Koopa" with an environmental design for the launch of the First Festival Fringe held at the Brisbane Jazz Club.

Founder and the first chairman of Kickarts inc.(now Kickarts Contemporary Arts), Garry Andrews' work was included in the ground-breaking, satirically entitled exhibition "The Fish That John West Regrets", curated by Chris Downie the exhibition heralded a paradigm shift in regional Queensland arts practice when it opened at the Cairns Regional Gallery on 6 August 1993. Tim Morrell, who was the curator of Contemporary Australian Art for the Queensland Art Gallery described the exhibition as "-a sensational show, it's one of the best regional art exhibitions I've ever seen".

== Paintings ==
Art needs to be something that is more than sheer technical bravado or dexterity. It is a matter of total intellectual/emotional response to one's environment.

- Andrews quoted in 1993.

Professor Pat Hoffie wrote in 2004 that "Garry Andrews' paintings draw from a particularly Queensland tradition of figurative expressionism that has enjoyed a long and popular heritage. Artists who are a part of this heritage include Jon Molvig, Ian Smith and Ann Thomson. Andrews' drafting skills are made evident in his painterly gestures, and his references are both literary and poetic."

Various commentators have written about Andrews' including Ann Saint Martin who in her article "Tyranny of Distance" wrote in 1993 that: "Garry Andrews, Cairns artist and painter of enduring vitality, has created important pictures for almost 15 years. He is widely acknowledged to have a "gift", and to be a draftsman of genius with a beautiful brush stroke that expresses both impulsive energy and reflective thought encompassing the mask, myth and totems".

Arts writer Peter Anderson commented on Andrews' paintings in the Courier Mail article "Exploring a Modernist Tropical Garden": "Garry Andrews-whose exhibition "The Landscape Ghost" is at Gilchrist Galleries, has spent most of the past two decades painting and exhibiting in Far North Queensland and it shows. While he's clearly been influenced by abstract expressionists such as Pollock and Arshile Gorky, his years in the north, (both Townsville and Cairns are also clearly in evidence)". Anderson elaborates..."In a rich palette of deep blues, greens and oranges, Andrews manipulates a set relatively simple motifs to create works that seem to mimic the play of light and shadow, positive and negative space, that one often finds deep in the rainforest." Anderson summarises that: " While it is possible to describe Andrews as a landscape painter...his way of working seems to be more about capturing an underlying essence, rather than any particular scene".

In 1982 and 1986 Andrews studied at the McGregor Summer School, USQ Toowoomba, under Colin Lancely and Andrew Sibley respectively. Garry Andrews was a finalist in the Jupiters Art Awards exhibitions at the Gold Coast Art Gallery in 1997,1998. His work was included in the 2002 Jacaranda Acquisitive Drawing Award Exhibition which toured to many regional centres in 2003.

== Sources ==
- Drury, Nevill: "New Art Seven | Profiles in Contemporary Australian Art", Craftsman House, Roseville, 1992, p. 14
- The Brisbane Courier Mail,"Outrage as David told to cover up".Page 1, 17.February 1995
- Wilson, Katherine:"Kick arse, Kick start, Kick arts". Voice, December 1993
- Adams, Jeanie, Commentary:"The Fish John West Regrets". Art Monthly, October 1993, pp. 27,28,29
- Hoffie, Pat-from the catalogue for the exhibition "No Emergency" Fine Art Honours and MAVA students Queensland College of Arts, Griffith University, 2004.
- Anderson, Peter: "Exploring a Modernist Tropical Garden" The Courier Mail, Arts, 25.11.98 p. 42
- Anderson, Peter: "Tim Morrell | Interviewed by Peter Anderson" QAA Newsletter December 1993, p. 10
- Drury, Nevill: "New Art Seven | Profiles in Contemporary Australian Art", Craftsman House, Roseville, 1992, p. 14
- Saint Martin, Ann : "The Tyranny of Distance" Cairns RAG Newsletter, January 1993, p. 5
- Saint Martin, Ann : "The Tyranny of Distance" Cairns RAG Newsletter, January 1993, p. 5
- Drury, Nevill: "New Art Seven | Profiles in Contemporary Australian Art", Craftsman House, Roseville, 1992, p. 14
