= Norman Andrews =

English cricketer

Personal information
- Full name: Norman Palmer Andrews
- Born: 1 May 1899; Sydenham, London
- Died: 5 November 1971 (aged 72); Westminster School, London
- Batting: Right-handed

Domestic team information
- Years: Team
- 1922–1923: Northants

Career statistics
Competition	First-class
Matches	6
Runs scored	122
Batting average	11.09
100s/50s	0/0
Top score	45*
Catches/stumpings	1/–
- Source: CricketArchive, 12 August 2008

Norman Palmer Andrews (1 May 1899 – 5 November 1971) was an English first-class cricketer who played for Northamptonshire County Cricket Club in six matches in 1922 and 1923. His highest score of 45* came when playing for Northamptonshire in the match against Essex County Cricket Club.
