= Jane Andrews (author) =

American author & educator (1833–1887)

Jane Andrews (December 1, 1833 – July 15, 1887) was an American author and educator.

== Early years and education ==
Andrews was born in Newburyport, Massachusetts, as the third child and daughter of John and Margaret Demmon Rand Andrews. Her grandfather, Reverend John Andrews, was pastor of the Unitarian First Religious Society Church and Parish Hall in Newburyport. She attended the Putnam Free School in Newburyport and was part of a small writing group run by Unitarian minister and author Thomas Wentworth Higginson that also included Harriet Elizabeth Prescott Spofford and Louisa Parsons Stone Hopkins. Andrews began teaching in the winter of 1850 at Higginson's evening school for cotton mill workers. The next spring, she began attending the State Normal School in West Newton, Massachusetts, and graduated as valedictorian in 1853. A particular influence was her geography teacher Lucretia Crocker. She lived in the same boardinghouse as Elizabeth Peabody and through her met Peabody's brother-in-law, the educator Horace Mann. Mann encouraged Andrews to enroll at his new school, Antioch College in Ohio, and she became the first student to register there. Her stay at Antioch was brief because in the middle of her first year at the school, a neurological disorder described as a "spinal affliction" forced her to return to Newburyport, where she remained as an invalid for six years.

== Career ==
In 1860, she was able to open a small primary school in her home, where her students included author Ethel Parton, suffragist Alice Stone Blackwell, and chemist J. Lewis Howe. Influenced by Mann's theories, her teaching was advanced for its day, with its emphasis on student experimentation and observation, involvement in the learning process, and societal responsibility. After 25 years, her health forced her to close the school in 1885.

Out of her lessons grew a series of popular children's books. Her first book was The Seven Little Sisters Who Live on the Round Ball That Floats in the Air (1861), a collection of stories about seven young girls who live in different countries. The book was immensely popular; it sold nearly half a million copies over the next century and was translated into Chinese, German, and Japanese. It was followed by a sequel, Each and All: Seven Little Sisters Prove Their Sisterhood (1877), and a similar book about boys in different historical time periods, Ten Boys Who Lived on the Road From Long Ago to Now (1886). She also wrote the books Geographical Plays for Young Folks at Home and School (1880) The Child's Health Primer (1885), Only A Year and What It Brought (1888), The Stories Mother Nature Told Her Children (1889), and The Stories of My Four Friends (1900). Andrews' works continued to be used in elementary schools a half-century after her death.

Andrews died of meningitis at the age of 53.
