= Arthur Andrews (footballer, born 1903) =

English footballer

Arthur Andrews (12 January 1903 – 1971) was an English footballer who played for Sunderland as a defender.

Having started out at Durham City, he made his debut for Sunderland on 9 December 1922 against Everton in a 1–1 draw at Goodison Park. Andrews played for Sunderland from 1922 to 1931 and made a total of 227 league appearances scoring two goals.

He subsequently played for Blyth Spartans.
