= Malcolm Andrews =

Australian author and journalist (1944–2018)

Malcolm Andrews (1944 – 10 October 2018) was an Australian author and journalist. In his 45-year career, he worked for such media organisations as The Australian, the Daily Telegraph (Sydney), the Daily Express (London) and the Nine Network's current affairs program, Today. In the early 1970s, he spent five years in Munich working for the US State Department at Radio Free Europe/Radio Liberty, which broadcast news behind the Iron Curtain.

For five years in the 1980s, he was a daily columnist on the Telegraph. His first column, which ran for three years, was 'On The Spot', a half-page look at a particular personality or human interest story. During the other two years, he wrote 'Sydney Diary', a pithy collection of gossip and stories about people making headlines and others vainly trying to keep their names out of them.

As a freelance based on the New South Wales north coast, Andrews wrote extensively on a wide variety of subjects for a whole spectrum of newspapers and magazines. They have included several News Limited capital city newspapers. For many years he also wrote a weekly profile on a newsworthy Australian that was syndicated through several of the larger provincial newspapers. He was Australian correspondent for the British weekly, Rugby Leaguer & League Express, and as such wrote more words annually on Rugby league than any other journalist in the world. For almost 30 years he was also a regular columnist in Turf Monthly magazine and won several awards for his newspaper coverage of horse racing.

Andrews wrote 26 books. They include light-hearted looks at Australian life compiled in tandem with Bill Mitchell when he was cartoonist for The Australian, Great Aussie Stuff-upps, Great Aussie Trivia, Great Aussie Sports Heroes and sequels to the latter two. Others include Encyclopaedia of Australian Sports, Australia at the Olympics, Encyclopaedia of Australian Cricket, and the quaintly titled Another Bloody Sports Book.

He was commissioned to write Tappy, the memoirs of racecaller John Tapp, Quest for Gold, which chronicled the efforts of a group of Aussie medal hopes at the 2000 Olympics, The Fabulous Fairstar, a nostalgic history of the famous cruise liner which sailed into the sunset after 35 years of plying the sea lanes of the world, Bondi Icebergs Club – An Australian Icon, and Kostya – From Russia With Gloves, the ghosted pictorial autobiography of world boxing champion Kostya Tszyu, which made the top five in the non-fiction best-selling lists.

Andrews died in Port Macquarie on 10 October 2018.
