= Lilian Andrews =

British artist

- Born: Lilian Rusbridge; 2 August 1878; Brighton, England
- Died: c.1962
- Education: Brighton School of Art
- Known for: Bird paintings
- Spouse: Douglas Sharpus Andrews

Lilian Andrews (née Lilian Rusbridge; 2 August 1878 – c.1962) was a British artist who specialised in creating paintings of birds and animals.

== Biography ==
Andrews was born in Brighton, where her father was an inventor and engineer, and where she studied at the Brighton School of Art and won a bronze medal for design. Awarded an Art Masters' Teaching Certificate, Andrews was teaching art by the age of twenty-two.

Working in pastels and watercolours Andrews painted landscapes and depicted birds and animals. Andrews had solo exhibitions in Leeds, Bradford, Newcastle upon Tyne and in Bournemouth and Brighton. Between 1912 and 1960 she exhibited some 39 pictures at the Royal Academy in London, the majority of which were bird paintings. She also exhibited with the Royal Scottish Academy during 1954 and 1955 and, in 1952, with the Royal Glasgow Institute of the Fine Arts and at the Paris Salon. For a time Andrews taught at the Brighton College of Art but after her marriage to Douglas Sharpus Andrews in 1910, the principal of Leeds School of Art, she also lived in Leeds, Sheffield, Bath and, latterly, London. The Laing Art Gallery in Newcastle upon Tyne, Leeds Art Gallery and Nottingham Art Gallery all hold examples of Andrews' paintings.
