= Mary Andrews (geologist) =

Irish geologist (1854–1914)

- Born: 5 October 1851/2; Belfast, Ireland
- Died: 14 August 1914; Royat, France

Mary K. Andrews (1851/2–1914) was an Irish geologist, notable as one of the first women to be active in this subject area.

== Life ==
Born in Belfast on 5 October 1851 or 1852, Mary Katherine Andrews was one of six children born to Jane Hardie and the chemist Thomas Andrews. Her first geology paper was The Early History of Magnetism from 1876, published in Nature.

She was Honorary Secretary of the geological section of the Belfast Naturalists' Field Club (BNFC) after its establishment in 1893. A friend and collaborator of Sydney Mary Thompson, Andrews photographed features of special interest for the British Association, and curated the BNFC's local geological specimens.

Andrews was one of twelve women who presented papers at the women's section of the geological congress, as a part of the World's Congress Auxiliary of the World's Columbian Exposition in Chicago, in August 1893. She represented Queen's College, Belfast and the BNFC at the 1907 centenary celebrations of the Geological Society.

Andrews lived with her older sister, Elizabeth (1843-1929), at 12 College Gardens, Belfast. Andrews died on 14 August 1914 in Royat, France. Most of her specimens are now held in the National Museums Northern Ireland.

== Works ==
- (as K.) The Early History of Magnetism, Nature, 27 April 1876.
- 'Denudation at Cultra, County Down' [1892], Irish Naturalist 2 (1893), pp. 16–18; 47-49; Belfast Field Club Reports 3 (1893), pp. 529–32
- 'Dykes in Antrim and Down', Irish Naturalist 3 (1894), pp. 93–6
- 'Erosion at Newcastle', Irish Naturalist, 10, 114
- 'Notes on Moel Tryfaen' [1894], Belfast Field Club Reports 4 (1901), pp. 205–10
