= Joe Andrew (footballer) =

Australian rules footballer (1889–1982)

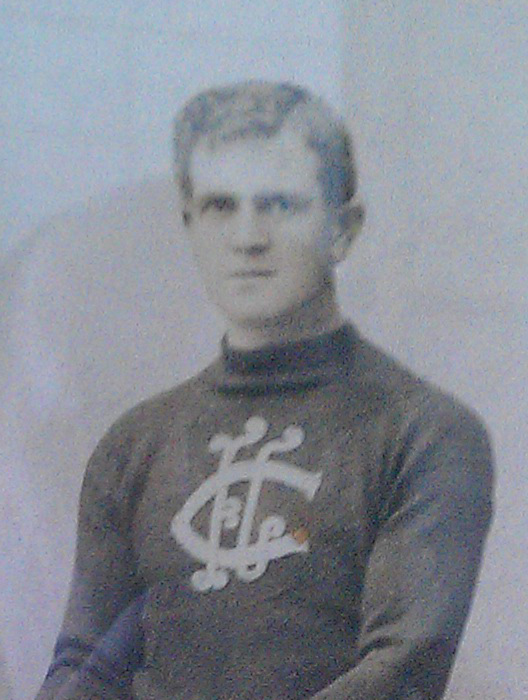
- Andrew in 1914

Personal information
- Full name: Joseph Walter Andrew
- Born: 17 April 1889; Carlton, Victoria
- Died: 21 July 1982 (aged 93)
- Original team: Carlton District

Playing career^{1}
| Years | Club | Games (Goals) |
| 1914 | Carlton | 2 (0) |
- ^{1} Playing statistics correct to the end of 1914.

Joseph Walter Andrew (17 April 1889 – 21 July 1982) was an Australian rules footballer who played with Carlton in the Victorian Football League (VFL).
