= Gerald Smedley Andrews =

Canadian eduacator and soldier (1903–2005)

- Born: December 12, 1903; Winnipeg, Manitoba
- Died: December 5, 2005 (aged 101)
- Occupations: Canadian frontier teacher, land surveyor, and soldier
- Awards: Order of Canada; Order of the British Empire; Order of British Columbia

OBC ribbon

Gerald Smedley Andrews, CM MBE OBC (December 12, 1903 – December 5, 2005) was a Canadian frontier teacher, land surveyor, and soldier.

Born in Winnipeg, Manitoba, he was educated in Vancouver, Toronto, Oxford, and Dresden. From 1922 to 1930, he was a school master at Big Bar Creek and Kelly Lake. In 1930, he became a land surveyor until World War II, specializing in the use of aerial photography applied to forestry. During World War II, he rose to the rank of Lieutenant-Colonel, commanding a section that was responsible for mapping Normandy beaches before D-Day using his aerial photogrammetry experience from British Columbia. From 1946 to 1950, he served as Chief Air Survey Engineer for British Columbia. From 1952 to 1968, he was the Surveyors General of the Province of British Columbia and Director of Mapping and Provincial Boundaries Commissioner.

For his services, during World War II, he was made a Member of the Order of the British Empire. In 1990, he was awarded the Order of British Columbia and was made a Member of the Order of Canada. He died at age 101 in December 2005.
