= Simon Andrews =

Simon Andrews may refer to:

- Simon Andrews (composer) (born 1958), British composer
- Simon Andrews (cricketer) (born 1980), New Zealand cricketer
- Simon Andrews (motorcyclist) (1982–2014), British motorcycle racer
