= Barry Andrews =

Barry Andrews may refer to:

- Barry Andrews (rugby league) (born 1950), Australian rugby league player
- Barry Andrews (musician) (born 1956), English vocalist and keyboardist with XTC and Shriekback
- Barry Andrews (politician) (born 1967), Irish Fianna Fáil politician and former CEO of GOAL
