= Judith Walker Andrews =

American philanthropist and social reformer (1826–1914)

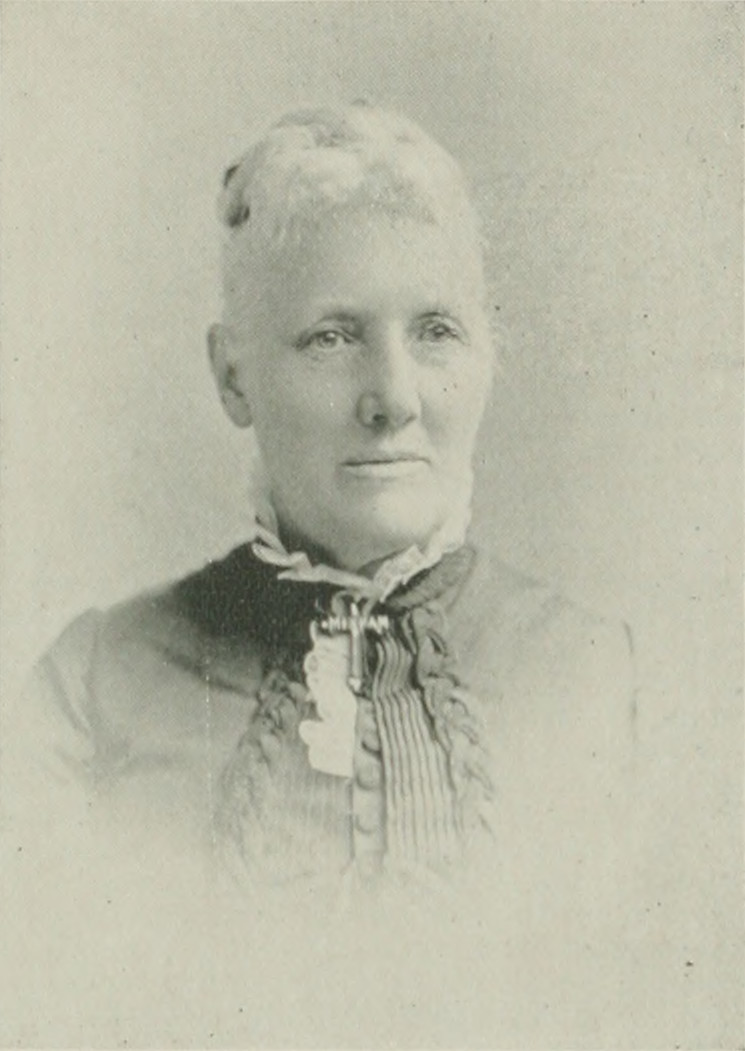
- Judith Walker Andrews, A Woman of the Century
- Born: Judith Walker; April 26, 1826; Fryeburg, Maine, U.S.
- Died: August 29, 1914 (aged 88); Boston, Massachusetts, U.S.
- Resting place: Harmony Grove Cemetery, Salem, Massachusetts, U.S.
- Occupations: Philanthropist; social reformer
- Spouse: Joseph Andrews (m. 1857; died 1869)
- Children: 3

Judith Walker Andrews (April 26, 1826 – August 29, 1914) was an American philanthropist and social reformer. She was the first president of the "National Alliance of Unitarian and Other Liberal Christian Women".

Her brother, Dr. Clement A. Walker, was appointed in charge of the hospital for the insane in Boston, and Andrews joined him there to assist in the work in which she was deeply interested. Her work in this line was of great value. From 1889, she was very much interested in the child-widows of India and formed an association to carry out the plans of Pandita Ramabai. Andrews and her co-workers managed a school at Puna, Gujarat, India.

== Early life and education ==
Judith Walker was born in Fryeburg, Maine, April 26, 1826. Her brother, Dr. Clement A. Walker, was one of the first of the new school of physicians for the insane.

She was educated at Fryeburgh Academy with the intention of becoming a teacher.

== Career ==
After Dr. Clement Walker was appointed to the charge of the newly established hospital for the insane in Boston, his sister joined him there. Although never officially connected with the institution, which had already gained a reputation as a pioneer in improved administration of the work for the insane, Andrews interested herself in the details of that administration, and by her personal attention to the patients endeared herself to them. No better school of training could be found in that day for the activities to which she gave her life.

She was married while in the institution, on January 15, 1857, to Joseph Andrews (died 1869), of Salem, Massachusetts, who gave much time and labor to the improvement of the militia system of the commonwealth, both before and during the American Civil War. They had three children, all boys, and she attended to their education.

Removing to Boston in 1863, she became a member of the South Congregational Church (Unitarian), and in 1876 was elected president of its ladies' organization, the South Friendly Society. Her service of 16 years in that office was only one of five such terms in the history of the society. Under the influence of its pastor, Dr. Edward Everett Hale, the South Congregational Church had wide relations both inside and outside denominational lines, and these relations brought to Andrews opportunities for religious and philanthropic work to which she was always ready to respond.

While most of these, though requiring much work and thought, were of a local character, two lines of her work made her name familiar to a large circle. Elected, in 1886, president of the Women's Auxiliary Conference, she was active in the movement to enlarge its scope and usefulness; and in 1889, when the National Alliance of Unitarian and Other Liberal Christian Women was organized, she became its first president, declining re-election in 1891. From 1889, she was a member of the Council of the National Unitarian Conference.

Having become interested in the child-widows of India, through the eloquence, and later the personal friendship, of Pandita Ramabai, Andrews was largely instrumental in the formation of the Ramabai Association, to carry out the plans of Ramabai and to systematize the work of her friends throughout the country. To the executive committee of that association, of which Andrews was chair from the beginning, was entrusted the oversight of the management of the school for child-widows, the Sharada Sadana at Poona and the settlement of the many delicate questions arising from a work so opposed to the customs though fortunately not to the best traditions, of India.

== Death ==
She died August 29, 1914, in Boston, and was buried at Harmony Grove Cemetery, in Salem.
