= Keith Andrews =

Keith Andrews may refer to:

- Keith Andrews (art historian) (1920–1989), British art historian
- Keith Andrews (racing driver) (1920–1957), American racecar driver
- Keith Andrews (bishop) (born 1954), American Anglican bishop
- Keith Andrews (rugby union) (born 1962), South African rugby union player
- Keith Andrews (footballer) (born 1980), Irish footballer

== See also ==
- Keith Andrew (1929–2010), English cricketer
- Andrew Keith (disambiguation)
