= Lynching of William Andrews =

1897 lynching in Princess Anne, Maryland

- Location: Princess Anne, Maryland, U.S.
- Date: 9 June 1897
- Attack type: Lynching
- Deaths: 1
- Victim: William Andrews
- Perpetrator: White mob
- Motive: Alleged assault of a white woman
- Inquiries: None at the time; posthumous pardon (2021)
- Judge: Henry Page (presiding over the trial)

William Andrews was an African American laborer who was lynched by a white mob in Princess Anne, Maryland on June 9, 1897. Andrews, then 17, was tried, convicted, and hanged all in one day after being accused of assaulting Mrs. Benjamin T. Kelley.

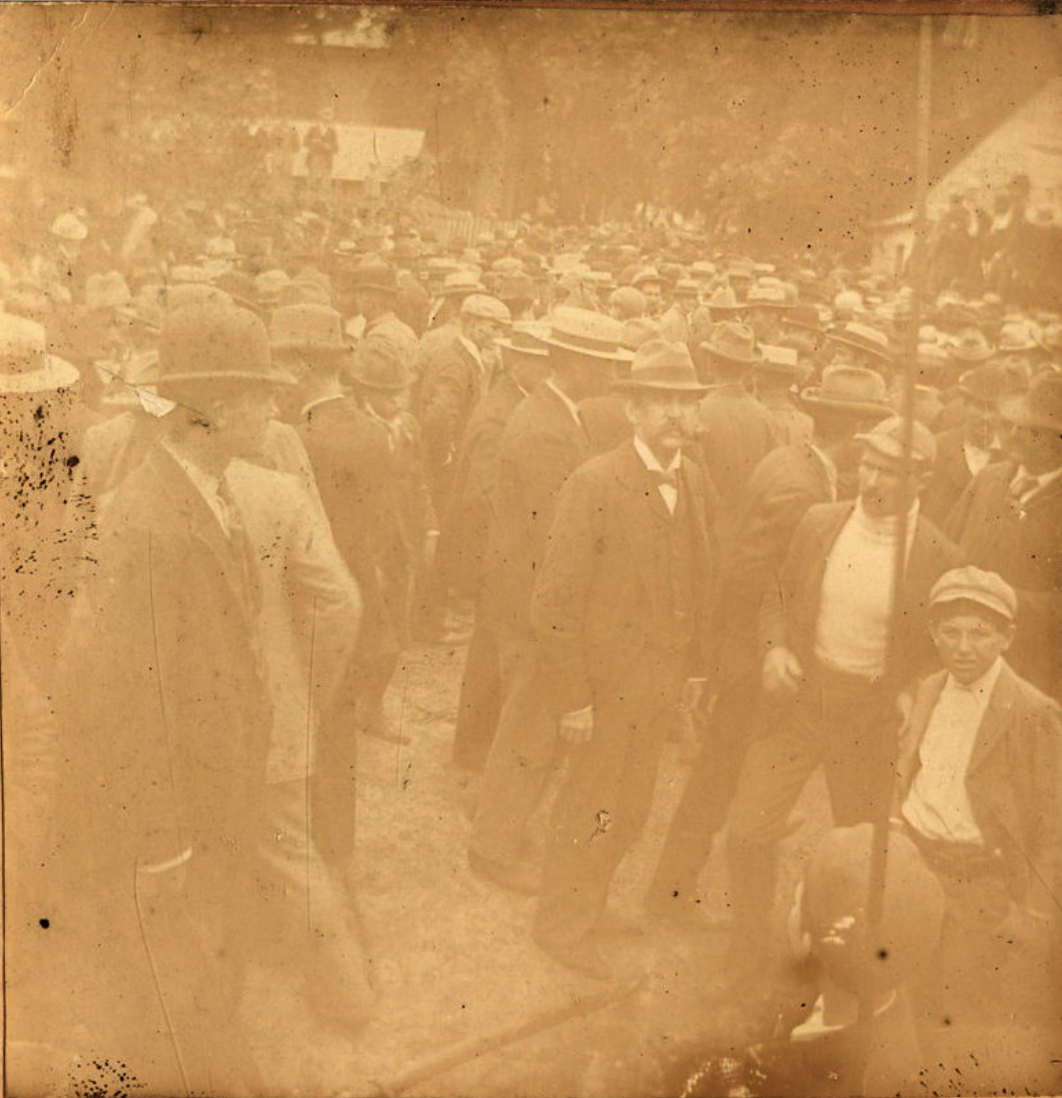
The white mob that killed Andrews.

== Arrest and trial ==
On the afternoon of May 5, 1897, Mrs. Benjamin T. Kelley claimed that local African American laborer William Andrews, aka "Cuba", raped her in Marion, Somerset County. Following these claims, Andrews was immediately arrested for the alleged attack on Kelley. He was moved to Baltimore City jail for protection from "lynch mobs" while awaiting trial. Around 11:00 a.m. on June 9, Andrews was brought to Main Street in Princess Anne, Somerset County where he pleaded guilty. Judge Henry Page sentenced Andrews to death by hanging at the state's request.

== Lynching ==
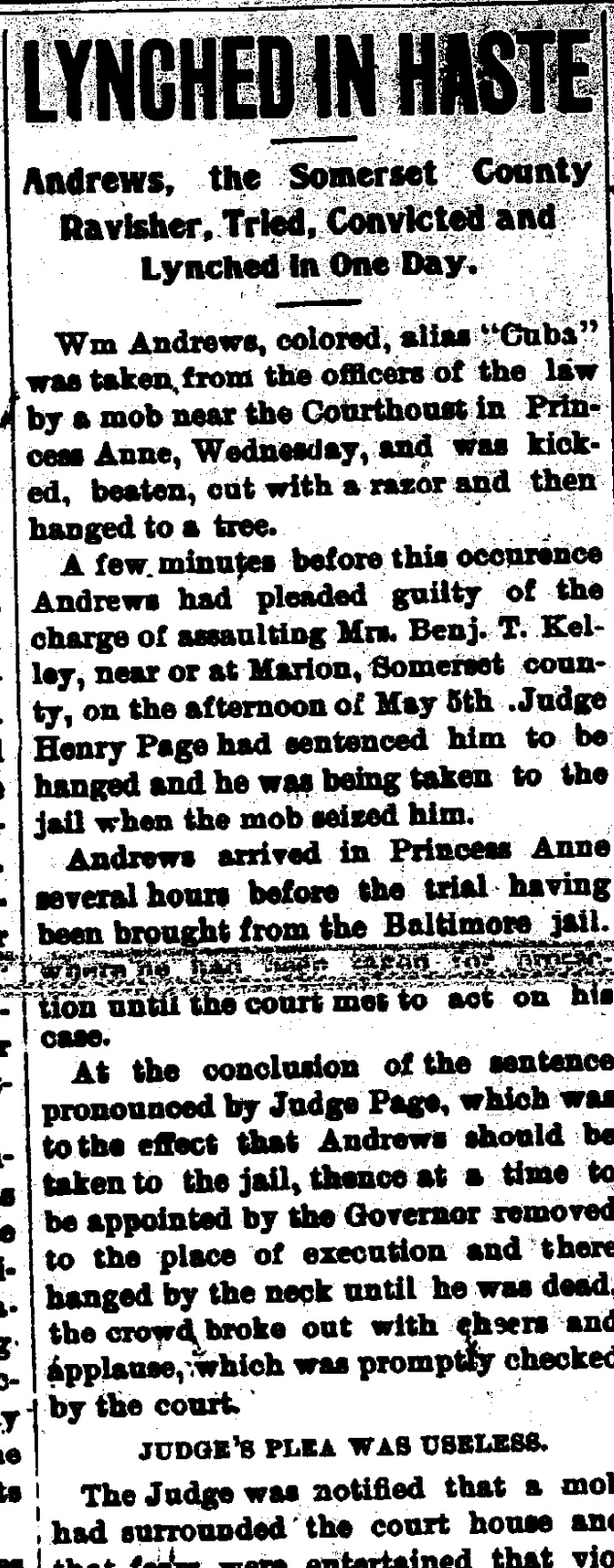
A newspaper article from 1897 regarding the William Andrews Lynching.

Once the court adjourned, a large mob began to grow outside the courthouse making it impossible for the officers to transfer Andrews to the nearby Somerset County jail. While handcuffed, William Andrews was ripped away from the arms of the officers by an infuriated mob that cheered after hearing a guilty verdict. Andrews was brutally kicked, punched, and beaten with all sorts of weapons until the crowd of people were satisfied. After the crowd realized Andrew Williams was still alive they dragged his body to the property of Z. James Doughtery, where he was hanged on a walnut tree until he was finally pronounced dead. His body remained on the walnut tree until around 2:30 p.m. on June 9, 1897.

== Aftermath ==
Andrews and 33 other lynching victims were posthumously pardoned by Larry Hogan in 2021.

== See also ==
- Mass racial violence in the United States
- Lynching of Matthew Williams

== Bibliography ==
- "The Lynching at Maryland". Black Virginia: The Richmond Planet.
- "William Andrews". Archives of Maryland.
- Pitts, Jonathan; Pate, Caroline. "Lynchings in Maryland". The Baltimore Sun.
- "Lynching in Maryland". The New York Times. June 10, 1897.
- "Shameful Past: Lynchings on Delmarva- William Andrews Lynched in Princess Anne in 1897". WBOC. October 21, 2021 [January 30, 2019].
