= Frank Andrews =

Frank Andrews may refer to:

- Frank Andrews (politician) (1854–1924), farmer, educator and political figure in Nova Scotia, Canada
- Frank Andrews (Texas lawyer) (1864–1936), assistant attorney general of Texas
- Frank Andrews (rugby) (1886–1944), Welsh rugby union and rugby league footballer
- Frank Andrews (singer) (born 1985), contestant from Season 2 of New Zealand Idol
- Frank Andrews (actor) (c. 1860–1935), Broadway and silent film actor in The Warrens of Virginia (1924 film)
- Frank Maxwell Andrews (1884–1943), Lieutenant General, Air Corps, U.S. Army
- Frank Mills Andrews (1867–1948), American architect

== See also ==
- Frank Andrews Shimkus (born 1952), often known as Frank Andrews, former journalist and Pennsylvania State Representative
- Francis Andrews (disambiguation)
