= Kevin Andrews =

Kevin Andrews may refer to:

- Kevin Andrews (politician) (1955–2024), Australian politician
- Kevin Andrews (writer) (1924–1989), American writer and archaeologist
