= Richard Andrews =

Richard Andrews may refer to:

- Richard Andrews (industrialist) (1798–1859), industrialist and mayor of Southampton
- Richard Andrews (soldier) (1800–1835), first rebel killed during the Texas Revolution
- Richard Bullock Andrews (1823–1884), South Australian politician and Supreme Court judge
- Richard G. Andrews (born 1955), U.S. District Court judge and former state prosecutor in Delaware
- Richard Snowden Andrews (1830–1903), American architect, Confederate artillery commander and diplomat
