= Matthew Andrews =

Electrical engineer

Matthew Andrews works at Bell Labs in Murray Hill, New Jersey. He was named Fellow of the Institute of Electrical and Electronics Engineers (IEEE) in 2015 for contributions to network design and wireless resource allocation.
