= Cyrus Andrews =

English journalist

Frederick Cyrus Andrews (8 December 1902 – March 1988) was an English journalist who was born in Bushey, Herts.

In 1947, he compiled and edited the Radio Who's Who for Pendulum Publications. This book was updated as Radio and Television Who's Who in 1950 and 1954.

Andrews was educated at Christ's Hospital before working in banking for 25 years. After this, he turned to journalism when he became the radio critic for Sunday Empire News. He was also a radio writer for other publications, including Sound and Band Wagon. In 1949 he adapted The Ghost and Mrs. Muir for radio, and contributed many whodunit plots and scripts for a variety of BBC series over his career.
