= Charles Andrews (organist) =

English organist

Charles Andrews is Liturgical Organist at Temple Church, London, having been Associate Director of Music, All Saints, Margaret Street from 2011 to 2016. He studied organ at the Royal College of Music with David Graham and Sophie-Véronique Cauchefer-Choplin, with the support of a Douglas and Kyra Downie Award.

He was Accompanist to Hertfordshire Chorus from 2011-2018. Prior to his appointment at All Saints, Margaret Street he held posts at St John's, Hyde Park, Chelmsford Cathedral, and the Michael James organ scholarship at Rochester Cathedral.

Engagements in 2012 include the premiere of David Briggs Mosaïque for organ duo, with Roger Sayer.

== Discography ==
- Duruflé Prélude sur l'Introït de l'Épiphanie op 13 and Toccata op 5 from the album Missa Carolae & Songs of the Nativity, A Christmas Album from Rochester Cathedral
- Midas Touch, Roger Sayer and Charles Andrews at the organ of Rochester Cathedral
