= Edmund L. Andrews =

American journalist

Edmund L. Andrews is a former economics reporter for The New York Times who served as a technology reporter in Washington, European economics correspondent and Washington economics correspondent.

Andrews is best known as the author in 2009 of Busted: Life Inside the Great Mortgage Meltdown, an account of his own experience with subprime mortgages during the housing bubble. An extended excerpt from the book appeared in The New York Times Magazine as "My Personal Credit Crisis."

In the book, Andrews described his own mortgage crisis as a case study of recklessness during the housing bubble by home buyers like himself as well as by lenders and Wall Street. "Nobody duped or hypnotized me," he wrote. "Like so many others — borrowers, lenders and the Wall Street dealmakers behind them — I just thought I could beat the odds." In addition to recounting his own fateful decisions, Andrews examined the downfall of two of his major lenders, and the actions of the Wall Street firms that supported them.

The book attracted widespread public attention, as well as controversy. Andrews appeared on CNBC, NPR's All Things Considered, the NewsHour on PBS, The Colbert Report, and other venues to promote his book. Michelle Singletary, personal finance columnist for The Washington Post, wrote that "The president and every member of Congress should read this book."

Andrews was criticized by Megan McArdle, a blogger from The Atlantic, for not mentioning his wife's bankruptcies in the book, and by Andrew Leonard from the Salon magazine for not disclosing his book advance. He responded to the criticism on the PBS website. Later, The New York Times public editor Clark Hoyt acknowledged the controversy but expressed more concern that Times editors were still asking Andrews to cover the financial crisis. Although Andrews "is an excellent reporter who explains complex issues clearly", Hoyt wrote, he is "too close to [the financial crisis] story" and should not cover it." Bradford DeLong, professor of economics at UC Berkeley, analyzed Hoyt's comments and concluded "he should have revealed the second bankruptcy, if only to head off the criticism, but because it shapes how we assess the damage done by the too-easy availability of credit".

Before writing Busted, Andrews wrote prolifically on both economic and non-economic topics. From 1990 to 1996, he covered technology policy, including the evolution of digital television, mobile communications and the overhaul of telecommunications law. From 1996 to 2002, he was the Times' European economics correspondent. After the U.S. invasion of Iraq in 2003, he covered the first several months of U.S. occupation. In 2007, he won an award for project reporting from the Society of American Business Editors and Writers for stories revealing that the Interior Department was failing to collect billions of dollars in oil and gas royalties. In 2009, he and a team of Times reporters were finalists for a Gerald R. Loeb award for breaking-news coverage of the 2008 financial crisis.

In December 2009, Andrews took a buyout from The New York Times. He blogged for Capital Gains and Games and became senior Washington writer for a digital economic news start-up, the Fiscal Times.

Andrews worked as an economics editor and deputy magazine editor at the National Journal in 2010 through late 2011. Andrews is currently an independent writer and consultant in Washington and California; he was written for Greater Good Magazine.
