= William Andrews (priest) =

William Andrews, D.D. was an Anglican priest and educationalist in Ireland.

Andrews was educated at Trinity College, Dublin. He was Head Master of Kilkenny College from 1702 to 1714; and Archdeacon of Ossory from 1713 until 1736.
