= Samuel Andrews =

Samuel Andrews may refer to:

- Sam Andrews (born 1982), English cricketer
- Samuel G. Andrews (1796–1863), American politician
- Samuel James Andrews (1817–1906), American clergyman
- Samuel Andrews (chemist) (1836–1904), English inventor
- Samuel Paull Andrews (1836–1916), New Zealand politician

== See also ==
- Samuel Andrew (1656–1738), American Congregational clergyman and educator
