= Kenneth Andrews (sociologist) =

American sociologist

Kenneth (Andy) Andrews is the Tileston Professor of Arts and Sciences and professor of sociology at Washington University in St. Louis. He received his doctorate in sociology from Stony Brook University in 1997. His bachelor's degree is from Millsaps College. Prior to his position at the University of North Carolina at Chapel Hill, Andrews was a member of the department of sociology at Harvard University and served as a visiting scholar for the Russell Sage Foundation in New York City.

Andrews grew up in Pensacola, Florida.

Andrews's research concerns the outcomes of social movements, especially the U.S. Civil Rights Movement. His book Freedom is a Constant Struggle: The Mississippi Civil Rights Movement and Its Legacy (2004) won the 2005 Distinguished Book Award of the American Sociological Association's Collective Behavior and Social Movements section.
