= Helena Andrews =

American writer

- Born: October 28, 1986 (age 39)
- Education: Columbia University (BA); Northwestern University (MSJ)
- Occupations: Pop cultural critic, author, journalist

Helena Andrews (born October 28, 1980) is an American author, pop culture critic, and journalist at The Washington Post. Her first book, Bitch is the New Black, was published by HarperCollins in June 2010. Bitch is the New Black is a collection of essays chronicling her experiences as a single black female in Washington, D.C. First conceptualized as a daily blog documenting the sad state of dating among educated African Americans, Bitch is the New Black evolved to describe all the influences and impacts on the modern black woman. Andrews is currently writing a screenplay for the movie version of the book. The film rights have been optioned by Grey's Anatomy creator/executive producer Shonda Rhimes, who will serve as executive producer for the project.

In an interview with The Root she discussed the upcoming book:

"Despite the fact that the most visible woman in the United States is black, popular culture still hasn't moved past the only adjective apparently meant to describe us: 'strong'. 'Bitch' will hopefully function as a sort of dictionary (abridged, of course), providing a new vocabulary for black women. Almost automatically I'd describe myself as strong, but I'm also flawed, tired, sexy, depressed, frightened, naïve, hilarious, greedy and, of course, bitchy. In 16 essays, 'Bitch' gives credence to each one of my faces - the secret sides every woman often keeps hidden."

== Career ==
Andrews began work in publishing as an intern at O, the Oprah Magazine in 2002. After leaving O, she worked brief stints at Seventeen, Domino and Rap-Up magazines. After a year pursuing a master's degree from Northwestern University in 2005, Andrews worked as a news assistant in the Washington bureau of The New York Times. In 2006 she became a staff writer for the online political magazine Politico.com where she covered the cultural goings on of Capitol Hill. She has appeared on CNN, Inside Edition, Fox News and XM Radio. Currently, she is a regular contributor to Slate's TheRoot.com and AOL's PoliticsDaily.com In 2015, she was reported to be working as a writer for the Washington Post.

Andrews graduated from Columbia University in 2002 with a Bachelor of Arts in English and Creative Writing. At Columbia, she joined the Rho chapter of Delta Sigma Theta sorority. She earned a master's degree in print journalism from the Medill School of Journalism at Northwestern University in 2005.

== 2015 White House Correspondents Dinner incident ==
At the annual White House Correspondents Dinner in Washington in 2015, Andrews was mistaken by many viewers watching on CNN for First Lady Michelle Obama, when caught on camera using her iPhone during the playing of the national anthem. A still of Andrews from the CNN clip went viral, and was circulated widely, often leading those who viewed it to assume it was the First Lady.

== Bibliography ==
- Bitch is the New Black (2010)
- The Mamas: What I Learned About Kids, Class and Race from Moms Not Like Me (2022)
