= Shelley Andrews =

Canadian field hockey player

Shelley Andrews (born 24 June 1953 in Victoria, British Columbia) is a Canadian former field hockey player who competed in the 1984 Summer Olympics.
