= Eric Andrews =

20th-century Australian historian

E. M. Andrews
- Born: Eric Montgomery Andrews; 1933; London, England
- Died: 2001 (aged 67–68); Newcastle, Australia

Academic background
- Education: University of Oxford; Australian National University
- Thesis: Australian Opinion and the European Crises, 1935–1939 (1965)

Academic work
- Institutions: University of Newcastle
- Main interests: Foreign and defence policy
- Notable works: The Anzac Illusion (1993)

Eric Montgomery Andrews (1933–2001), also known as E. M. Andrews, was an Australian historian, academic and author. He was born in London and gained his first degree at the University of Oxford. He completed a Doctor of Philosophy at the Australian National University and taught history at the University of Newcastle from 1967.

Andrews' book Isolationism and Appeasement in Australia: Reactions to the European Crises, 1935–1939 has been quoted in the Australian Capital Territory Legislative Assembly.

== Bibliography ==
=== Books ===
- — (1970). Isolationism and Appeasement in Australia: Reactions to the European Crises, 1935–1939. Canberra: Australian National University Press. ISBN 0708100295.
- — (1973). Australia and Britain in the Nineteenth Century. Hawthorn, Victoria: Longman. ISBN 0582682347.
- — (1974). Australia in the Modern World. Hawthorn, Victoria: Longman. ISBN 0582681782.
- — (1979). A History of Australian Foreign Policy: From Dependence to Independence. Melbourne: Longman Cheshire Australia. ISBN 0582682533.
- — (1985). Australia and China: The Ambiguous Relationship. Carlton, Victoria: Melbourne University Press. ISBN 0522842968.
  - Also published in Chinese as: Andrews, Eric (1992). 澳中关系史. Xiamen: Xiamen University Press. ISBN 9787561505533.
- — (1987). The Writing on the Wall: The British Commonwealth and Aggression in the East 1931–1935. Sydney: Allen and Unwin. ISBN 9780049090279.
- — (1993). The Anzac Illusion: Anglo-Australian relations during World War I. Melbourne: Cambridge University Press. ISBN 0521459893.
- — (2001). The Department of Defence. The Australian Centenary History of Defence. Vol. 5. Melbourne: Oxford University Press. ISBN 0195541138.
