= Arthur Andrews (cricketer) =

English cricketer

Personal information
- Full name: Arthur Andrews
- Born: 26 August 1856; Southampton, Hampshire, England
- Died: 26 February 1943 (aged 86); Aldershot, Hampshire, England
- Batting: Right-handed
- Bowling: Unknown
- Role: Occasional wicket-keeper

Domestic team information
- Years: Team
- 1880: Hampshire

Career statistics
Competition	First-class
Matches	7
Runs scored	236
Batting average	21.45
100s/50s	–/2
Top score	62*
Balls bowled	24
Wickets	0
Bowling average	–
5 wickets in innings	–
10 wickets in match	–
Best bowling	–
Catches/stumpings	6/2
- Source: Cricinfo, 12 August 2008

Arthur Andrews (26 August 1856 — 26 February 1943) was an English first-class cricketer.

Andrews was born at Southampton in August 1856. A club cricketer in Southampton for St Mary's Cricket Club, he made his debut in first-class cricket for Hampshire against Sussex at Hove in 1880. A gap of two years followed before his next appearance for Hampshire in 1882, against the Marylebone Cricket Club. Two further appearances followed in 1884, against Sussex and Somerset, before making two final first-class appearances in 1885 against Sussex and Derbyshire. With the loss of Hampshire's first-class status following the 1885 season, his first-class career came to an abrupt end; despite this, he continued to play second-class matches for Hampshire until 1887. In seven first-class appearances, Andrews scored 236 runs at an average of 21.45; he made two half centuries, with a highest score of 62 not out against Sussex in 1884. He occasionally played as a wicket-keeper. Andrews died at Aldershot in February 1943.
