= Jake Andrews =

Jake Andrews may refer to:

- Jake Andrews (guitarist) (born 1980), American blues guitaris
- Jake Andrews (American football) (born 1999), American football player
- Jake Andrews (footballer) (born 1997), English footballer
- Jacob Andrews (sprinter) (born 2004), American sprinter, 2024 and 2025 All-American for the USC Trojans track and field team
- Jake Andrews, Australian musician in 78 Saab
- Jake Andrews, presenter on WYBL
- Jake Andrews, fictional character in Special Agent
