= Walter Andrews (bishop) =

Andrews in November 1910.

Walter Andrews (26 September 1852 – 1 November 1932) was an Anglican bishop in Japan in the first third of the twentieth century.

Andrews was educated at Hertford Grammar School and St John's College, Cambridge. Andrews was ordained 1877 and began his career with a curacy in Brenchley. He went as a CMS Missionary to Nagasaki in 1878. He returned to England in 1896 to become rector of Middleton St George. In 1909 he was consecrated as Bishop of Hokkaido. He came back to England again in 1918 and was Vicar of St Bartholomew, Chichester, until 1920.
