= Wayne Andrews =

Wayne Andrews may refer to:

- Wayne Andrews (cricketer) (born 1958), Western Australian cricketer
- Wayne Andrews (footballer) (born 1977), English association footballer
- Wayne Andrews (historian) (1913–1987), American historian
