= Walter Andrews (cricketer) =

English cricketer

Personal information
- Full name: Walter Herman Andrews
- Born: 17 April 1865; Dulwich Common
- Died: 26 November 1908 (aged 43); Natal, South Africa
- Batting: Left-handed
- Bowling: Left-arm fast
- Relatives: Henry Andrews (father)

Domestic team information
- Years: Team
- 1888–1892: Sussex

Career statistics
Competition	First-class
Matches	37
Runs scored	864
Batting average	13.29
100s/50s	0/2
Top score	67
Balls bowled	35
Wickets	0
Bowling average	–
5 wickets in innings	–
10 wickets in match	–
Best bowling	–
Catches/stumpings	27/–
- Source: CricInfo, 12 August 2008

Walter Herman Andrews (17 April 1865 – 26 November 1908) was an English first-class cricketer who played for Sussex County Cricket Club. His highest score of 67 came when playing for Sussex against Gloucestershire County Cricket Club.

He also played three non first-class games for Sussex against Hampshire.
