= Mark Andrews =

Mark Andrews may refer to:

- Mark Andrews (politician) (1926–2020), American politician from the state of North Dakota
- Mark Andrews (filmmaker) (born 1968), American filmmaker at Pixar Animation Studios
- Mark Andrews (rower) (1959–2020), University boat race winner
- Mark Andrews (swimmer) (born 1965), Canadian swimmer
- Mark Andrews (rugby union) (born 1972), South African rugby player
- Sisqó (born Mark Andrews, born 1978), American R&B singer, lead singer of Dru Hill
- Mark E. Andrews (1903–1992), U.S. Assistant Secretary of the Navy
- Mark Andrews (wrestler) (born 1992), Welsh professional wrestler
- Mark Andrews (American football) (born 1995), American football player
- Mark Andrews, plaintiff of a defamation lawsuit regarding 2000 Mules
- Mark Andrews (organist) (1875–1939), British organist and composer

== See also ==
- Grand Forks International Airport, also known as Mark Andrews International Airport
- Mark Andrew (born 1950), American businessman and politician
