= Joseph Andrews (disambiguation) =

Joseph Andrews is a 1742 comic romance by Henry Fielding.

Joseph Andrews may also refer to:

- Joseph Andrews (film), a 1977 British film based on the novel
- Joseph Andrews (Australian politician) (1814–1901), New South Wales politician, 1880–1882
- Joseph Andrews (British politician) (1870–1909), British Liberal Member of Parliament, 1905–1906
- Joseph Andrews House, a historic house in Waltham, Massachusetts

== See also ==
- Joseph Andrew (disambiguation)
