= Deno Andrews =

American billiards player (born 1971)

Deno J. Andrews (born 1971) is an American former professional three cushion billiards player, a tournament promoter, and a coach to some well-known pool champions.

In September 2005, Andrews became Tour Director for the International Pool Tour (IPT), a major professional pool tour at that time. He ran the inaugural IPT event, the King of the Hill Shootout, an invitational tournament of 42 players from around the world, including many of the Billiard Congress of America's living Hall of Famers. The tournament paid out US$1,000,000 in total prize money, with a prize of $200,000 for the first-place finisher, Efren Reyes.

In private life, Andrews is a collector of antique billiard artifacts.
