= Harold Andrews =

Harold Andrews may refer to:

- Harold Andrews (footballer, born 1897) (1897–1984), English football forward, for Nelson, Merthyr Town and Exeter City in the 1920s
- Harold Andrews (footballer, born 1903) (1903–1988), English football forward, for Lincoln City, Notts County, Barnsley, Luton Town & Accrington Stanley fl. 1920s–1930s
- Harold Andrews (politician) (1945–1995), broadcaster and politician in Newfoundland
- Harold A. Andrews (1889–1958), justice of the Rhode Island Supreme Court
- SS Harold T. Andrews, a Liberty ship
- Harold Marcus Ervine-Andrews (1911–1995), Irish recipient of the Victoria Cross

== See also ==
- Harry Andrews (1911–1989), English actor
