= Ted Andrews =

American writer (1952–2009)

- Born: July 15, 1952; Dayton, Ohio
- Died: October 24, 2009 (aged 57); Jackson, Tennessee
- Occupations: Writer, clairvoyant, lecturer
- Known for: Author of Animal Speak
- Spouse: Kathy Andrews

Ted Andrews (July 15, 1952 – October 24, 2009) was an American writer, teacher of esoteric practices, and a clairvoyant. His book on animals as spirit guides and symbols, Animal Speak, sold almost 500,000 copies from 1993 to 2009; the influential Llewellyn-published book is widely cited by others.

== Early life ==
Andrews was born in Dayton, Ohio; he had six siblings all of whom were given names beginning with the letter 'T'. He spent most of his childhood at the east of Dayton in the city called Beavercreek. He claimed to experience clairvoyance, by seeing things that adults could not. He spent a lot of time walking through the woods with his grandfather, learning about nature. Andrews volunteered at Brukner Nature Center north of Dayton in Troy as a trail guide and animal keeper.

Andrews also read voraciously from the public library. A book of short stories sparked Andrews' interest in Jewish mysticism and in practical Kabbalah — particularly the legends in which Jewish mystics used the Kabbalah to create a golem of mud to fight antisemitic violence. In 1970, Andrews graduated from Carroll High School in Dayton, a private Catholic school.

== Career ==
Andrews worked for 10 years with the Cincinnati Public Schools as a teacher and counselor, including 7 years helping children with special needs. When he and the other teachers at his junior high school were each required to form a club for the students, he started an "ESP Club".

Andrews read about the occult, mysticism and metaphysics. In 1987 through Llewellyn Publications, he produced his first book, Simplified Magic: A Beginner’s Guide to the New Age Qabala, a guide to practical Kabbalah which was later reprinted as Simplified Qabala Magic. In 1991, he wrote How to See and Read the Aura, in which he says that "the aura is the energy field that surrounds all matter. Anything that has an atomic structure will have an aura..." Andrews wrote that the aura is a proven scientific phenomenon which can not only be viewed by humans but also manipulated using metaphysical practices such as the Jewish Kabbalah and the Indian pranayama.

In September 1993, Andrews published what would be his most successful book: Animal Speak: The Spiritual & Magical Powers of Creatures Great and Small. This book claimed to help the reader recognize which animal was their personal totem or spirit guide. It has been cited by researchers studying human attitudes toward animals, including professor Marian Scholtmeijer of the University of Northern British Columbia, professor David Starr-Glass of Empire State College, and doctoral candidate Venetia Laura Delano Robertson. Robertson wrote that Andrews was a typical example of "white shamanism" in that he followed French sociologist Émile Durkheim's assertion that totemism lets the practitioner "participate in the nature of the totem animal" to connect with the sacred core of human-as-animal. Andrews wrote, "when we learn to speak with the animals, to listen with animal ears and to see through animal eyes, we experience the phenomena, the power, and the potential of human essence." Animal Speak sold almost 500,000 copies from 1992 to 2009.

== Death ==
Andrews volunteered for some years at the Aullwood Audubon Center and Farm, working especially with raptors. Later, he lived with his wife, emergency room nurse Kathy Andrews, on a farm and animal rehabilitation center in Jackson, Tennessee. He died there of cancer on October 24, 2009. A memorial service was held in Beavercreek on January 30, 2010.
