= Paul Andrews =

Paul Andrews may refer to:

- Paul Andrews (Australian politician) (1955–2009), Labor member of the Western Australian Legislative Assembly
- Paul Andrews (British politician)
- Paul Andrews (NASCAR) (born 1957), NASCAR crew chief
- Paul Andrews (scientist) (born 1953), British physiologist
- Paul R. Andrews (1926–1983), American publisher
- Paul Martin Andrews (born 1959), American rape survivor and advocate for rape survivors
- Paul Andrews, birth name of ex-Iron Maiden singer Paul Di'Anno (1958–2024)
- Paul Andrews Jr. (died 2021), founder of TTI, Inc. and chairman of Mouser Electronics

== Fictional characters ==
- Paul Andrews, a character in the 1989 American science-fiction drama movie Beyond the Stars
