= Henry Andrews (mathematician) =

British mathematician and astronomer

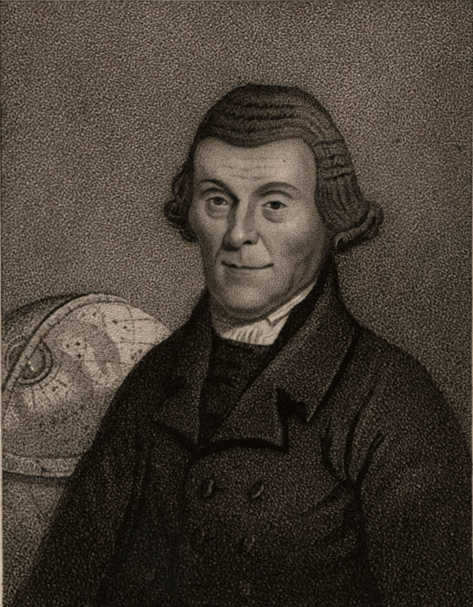
Henry Andrews in 1815 (71 years)

Henry Andrews (1744 – 26 January 1820) was born in the village of Frieston, near Grantham, Lincolnshire, England. He established a reputation as an accomplished mathematician and astronomer.

For 43 years he worked in his spare time as 'Compiler of the tables detailing the movement of the planets' for Old Moore's Almanac. His day job was Calculator to the Board of Longitude. He had also set up a boarding school which taught trigonometry and navigation as extra subjects, as well as running a shop which sold books, stationery, barometers, thermometers, and philosophical and mathematical instruments. He was a well-respected professional and valued advisor to the Rev'd Nevil Maskelyne, the Astronomer Royal.

Andrews predicted the annular solar eclipse in 1791:

To the north of Scotland it will be a very great eclipse; but nowhere total on account of the apparent diameter of the sun. The spectators will be entertained with a beautiful annulus, or ring of light encompassing the opaque body of the Moon on every side. This eclipse begins with the rising sun in the back settlements of Carolina and Virginia, from whence it traverses Hudson's Bay, north-easterly towards the coast of Greenland, Iceland and Lapland, and the northern coast of Great Tartary where this phenomenon will end and quit the earth with the setting sun.
