= David Andrews (diplomat) =

Australian writer and economist

- Born: 3 July 1952 (age 74)
- Other name: David Morisset
- Known for: Writer, economist and diplomat

David Andrews (born 3 July 1952) is a writer and former Australian diplomat and economist. He was the chairman of Trio Capital Limited at the time of its involvement in the largest superannuation fund fraud in Australian history. He has written poetry and a blog where he has published excerpts from several planned novels under the pen name David Morisset.

== Early life and education ==
Andrews attended school in Riverstone, New South Wales. In 1971 he left Riverstone to study economics at the Australian National University in Canberra and joined the then Department of Foreign Affairs in 1975.

== Career ==
During his eleven years as a diplomat, Andrews completed long term postings as a political officer in Tehran, Iran, and Dar es Salaam, Tanzania.

Andrews worked for Glebe Asset Management, the funds management division of the Australian Anglican Church. While he was Director, Glebe lifted its ban on investing in uranium mining, which, according to Bloomberg, was based "partly on concern increasing use of oil and coal is contributing to pollution and global warming."

He began working for the Trio Capital investment firm in 2006. The firm collapsed in 2009 in what has been called in the largest superannuation fund fraud in Australian history. He and other non-executive directors of Trio Capital entered into undertakings with the Australian Securities and Investments Commission and the Australian Prudential Regulation Authority voluntarily excluding themselves from corporate governance roles in the financial services sector for various periods. The ASIC's investigation of Andrews related to concerns that he had "contravened sections of the Corporations Act, and that he failed to exercise reasonable care and diligence" while APRA found that he "had failed to redeem existing investments in... and made ongoing investments in... an offshore hedge fund, despite investment risks and a lack of arms'-length arrangements."

== Works ==
Andrews began writing fiction in 2008, and chose the pseudonym David Morisset as a salute to his mother, who had encouraged his childhood attempts at creative writing. His poem "Persian Princess" was commended in the John Shaw Neilson Poetry Award (Fellowship of Australian Writers National Literary Awards 2009).

In April 2010, the Sydney Morning Herald reported that David Morisset was a pen name used by Andrews under which he had written a novel that contained many similarities (such as the defrauding of investors in an Australian superannuation fund) to the circumstances surrounding the fraud by Astarra Strategic Fund, an investment fund used by Trio Capital. The Sydney Morning Herald also reported that his novels appeared to have been inspired by his work as a diplomat and also by his experiences in the superannuation industry. Business Day called the similarities between the excerpts of his planned novel Lockhart Road and the scandal surrounding Trio Capital "striking". Andrews has also written poems about the Trio Capital scandal which the Sydney Morning Herald describes as showing that the events have apparently left him "scarred (and slightly embittered)".
