= Peter Andrews =

Peter Andrews may refer to:

- Peter B. Andrews (1937–2025), American mathematical logician
- Peter Andrews (agricultural pioneer) (born 1940), Australian environmentalist
- Peter Andrews (footballer) (1845–1916), Scottish international footballer
- Peter Andrews (scientist), Australian scientist
- Peter Andrews, a pseudonym used by American film director Steven Soderbergh (born 1963) when serving as his own Director of Photography
- Pop Andrews (Peter Andrews, fl. 1905–1914), American baseball player
