= Thomas Andrewe =

Thomas Andrewe (fl. 1604), was the author of a poem in rhymed heroics, entitled 'The Unmasking of a Feminine Machiavell,’ 4to, 1604.

Following the title is a dedication 'to his worthy and reverend Vncle, M. D. Langworth, Archdeacon of Welles;’ and then come some complimentary verses addressed to the author by Samuel Rowlands and others. The drift of the poem is somewhat uncertain, as the lady whose machinations were to be exposed is only hinted at darkly. Andrewe was one of the many soldiers of fortune who sought a field for enterprise in the Low Countries. He tells us how he embarked at Dover and went to Guelderland to serve under Prince Maurice and Sir Francis Vere. He took part in the battle of Nieuport (2 July 1600 N.S., 22 June 1600 O.S.) against the Archduke Albert; and he has given us a fairly spirited description of the battle. Shortly afterwards he returned to England, where he found a lady, whom he designates as a 'feminine Machiavell,’ busy in trying to take away his good name by calumnious reports. In self-defence he published his book.
