= T. Bill Andrews =

American painter and lawyer

T. Bill Andrews is an American abstract impressionist painter, author and lawyer.

== Life ==
T. Bill Andrews was born Thomas William Andrews in Kansas in 1958.

Andrews served in the U.S. Navy Nuclear Power Program before enrolling as an undergraduate member of the University of Iowa Writers' Workshop in the mid-1980s. It was while at the Writers' Workshop that he adopted his pen name "T. Bill" (sometimes "T-Bill"). He received his doctorate from Yale University, writing a fictionalized memoir of his experiences at Yale entitled Power Ties.

After graduating, Andrews worked as an attorney in various capacities, most recently as Assistant Attorney General of Iowa.

Andrews paints landscapes, florals and representational and architectural pieces in the style of impressionism, as well as figurative studies, but his primary emphasis is on large-format action painting in a style known as abstract expressionism. Long retired, his current painting studio fronts a large horse meadow.

== Works ==
- Andrews, Thomas William (2004). Power Ties: Yale Law School Demystified. Instantpublisher.com. ISBN 978-1-59196-461-2.

== See also ==
- Abstract expressionism
- Action painting
