= Louisa Parsons Hopkins =

American educator and poet

Louisa Parsons (Stone) Hopkins
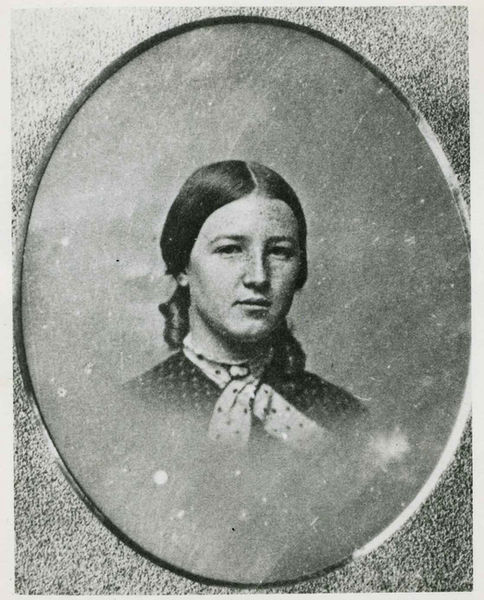
- Born: 1834
- Died: 1895 (aged 60–61)

Louisa Parsons Hopkins (1834–1895) was an American educator and poet, who spoke and wrote on progressive education.

== Life ==
Born in Newburyport in 1834, she attended the Putnam Free School, and was part of a small writing group under Thomas Wentworth Higginson, along with Jane Andrews and Harriet Prescott Spofford. Her husband's business "suffered a reversal in fortune", which led her to create a small primary school in her home for extra income. Her students did well, and she wrote up an article for the Journal of Education on her methods. This led to fame in educational circles, and ultimately to a string of books and speaking engagements. She was appointed to the Board of Supervisors of the Boston Public Schools, and paced by Governor William E. Russell on a commission to investigate the use of manual training in Europe. Her work on that commission was noted by contemporaries as being singular in nature.

She retired from that position due to illness and died a few years later.

== Works ==
- Breath of the Field and Shore (1881)
- Motherhood: A Poem (1881)
- Handbook of the Earth: Natural Methods in Geography (1883)
- Educational Psychology: a Treatise for Parents and Educators (1886)
- Natural-history Plays, Dialogues, and Recitations for School Exhibitions (1885)
- The Spirit of the New Education (1892)
- Observation Lessons in the Primary Schools: A Manual for Teachers (1896)
