= Henry Andrews (cricketer) =

English cricketer

Personal information
- Full name: Henry Wyche Andrews
- Born: 4 October 1821; Eling, Hampshire, England
- Died: 13 December 1865 (aged 44); Dulwich Common, Surrey, England
- Batting: Right handed
- Role: Wicket-keeper
- Relatives: Walter Andrews (son)

Domestic team information
- Years: Team
- 1849–1859: Gentlemen of Kent
- 1852–1863: Kent
- FC debut: 23 August 1849 Gentlemen of Kent v Gentlemen of England
- Last FC: 23 July 1863 Kent v Nottinghamshire

Career statistics
Competition	First-class
Matches	41
Runs scored	915
Batting average	13.45
100s/50s	0/2
Top score	58
Balls bowled	4
Wickets	0
Bowling average	–
5 wickets in innings	–
10 wickets in match	–
Best bowling	–
Catches/stumpings	31/8
- Source: CricInfo, 19 March 2017

Henry Wyche Andrews (4 October 1821 – 13 December 1865) was an English amateur cricketer who played matches for Kent County Cricket Club, the Gentlemen of Kent, Gentlemen of England, and England. He played between 1849 and 1863 with many of his appearances taking place either during Canterbury Cricket Weeks, a major social event in the south-east of England, or at Lord's.

Andrews was born at Eling in Hampshire in 1821. His parents Joshua and Elizabeth Andrews moved to Blackheath, then a village in north-west Kent, and he was educated at Blackheath Propriety School. He was one of the founders of Blackheath Paragon Cricket Club which played on the heath.

As a cricketer he was known as a hard hitter of a cricket ball, favouring playing to the leg side. He made his first-class cricket debut for the Gentlemen of Kent during the 1849 Canterbury Week as a wicket-keeper. In total he played in 41 first-class matches, playing intermittently for Kent between 1854 and 1863 as well as for amateur teams. He took 31 catches and made eight stumpings in first-class matches. Unusually Andrews played wearing spectacles, including whilst he was keeping wicket, is reported to have developed an innovative outfit for keeping wicket in consisting of a waistcoat attached to trousers, allowing him to "dispense with belt as well as braces". The Times reported in 1936 that "he was so chafed ... that he never wore it again in public".

Andrews lived at Blackheath Park in Kent and was a member of the London Stock Exchange. He married Harriet Terrey, the couple having 11 sons one of whom, Walter, played first-class cricket for Sussex between 1888 and 1892.

Andrews died at Dulwich Common in Surrey in 1865 aged 44.

== Bibliography ==
- Carlaw, Derek (2020). Kent County Cricketers, A to Z: Part One (1806–1914) (PDF). Cardiff: ACS.
