= Billy Andrews (footballer) =

American-born Irish association footballer

Personal information
- Date of birth: 1886
- Place of birth: Kansas City, Missouri, U.S.
- Place of death: Belfast, Northern Ireland
- Height: 5 ft 8 in (1.73 m)
- Position: Right half

Senior career*
| Years | Team | Apps | (Gls) |
| 1904–1906 | Distillery | | |
| 1906–1908 | Glentoran | 53 | (23) |
| 1908–1909 | Oldham Athletic | 9 | (3) |
| 1909–1910 | Stockport County | 13 | (0) |
| 1910–1912 | Glentoran | 59 | (9) |
| 1912–1915 | Grimsby Town | 105 | (2) |
| 1915–1916 | Distillery | | |
| 1916–1919 | Belfast United | | |
| 1919–1920 | Darlington | | |
| 1920–1922 | Leadgate Park | | |
| 1920–1923 | Belfast Bohemians | | |
| Total | | 239+ | (37+) |

International career
| 1908–1913 | Ireland | 3 | (0) |
- * Club domestic league appearances and goals

William Andrews (born 1886) was an Irish international footballer who played professionally in Ireland and England as a right half.

== Career ==
Andrews was born in Kansas City, USA and was raised in Ireland. He played club football in both Ireland and England, for Distillery, Glentoran, Oldham Athletic, Stockport County, Grimsby Town, Belfast United, Darlington, Leadgate Park and Belfast Bohemians.

Andrews also earned three caps for Ireland between 1908 and 1913.
