= List of almanacs =

This article gives a list of various almanacs. Note that almanac can also be spelled almanack, and some of the publications listed use this form.

== Printed almanacs ==
- Barbanera Almanac (1762–present)
- Canadian Almanac & Directory, Grey House Publishing Canada, a comprehensive resource
- Canadian Global Almanac (1992–2005), a book of facts about Canada and the world
- Deventer Almanak
- Encyclopædia Britannica Almanac (not the Yearbook, which is an annual update to the multi-volume encyclopedia; the almanac is a standalone publication)
- Enkhuizer Almanak (earliest known copy is from 1680)
- Farmers' Almanac (1818–2026)
- Kalnirnay – the world's largest yearly published almanac (1973–present)
- The New York Times Almanac (1969–2011)
- Nieropper Almanak
- O Verdadeiro Almanaque Borda D'Água (1929–present)
- Old Farmer's Almanac (1792–present)
- Schott's Almanac
- A Sound Word Almanac (2023)
- TIME Almanac with Information Please, formerly Information Please Almanac (1947–2013)
- Wall Street Journal Almanac (1998 and 1999)
- Whitaker's Almanack (1868–2021)
- The World Almanac and Book of Facts (1868–1876, 1886–present)
- Almanaque Abril (1974-2015)

== Online almanacs ==
- American Almanac, a traditional almanac presented as a mobile app
- Canadian Almanac & Directory, Grey House Publishing Canada, an online searchable database
- CIA World Factbook
- Information, Please!
- Sri Lanka Almanac Vidhyuth Koshaya

== Special-purpose almanacs ==
- The Almanac for Farmers & City Folk
- Almanach cracoviense ad annum 1474 (1473)
- Baer's Agricultural Almanac (1825–present)
- Blum's Farmer's and Planter's Almanac (1828–present)
- Grier's Almanac (1807–present)
- Harris' Farmer's Almanac (1692–present)
- J. Gruber's Hagerstown Town & Country Almanack (1797–present)
- Jewish Year Book (1896–present)
- Kulavruttanta (1915–present)
- New Zealand Cricket Almanack (1948–present)
- Old Moore's Almanack (1699–present)
- Places Rated Almanac (1982–2007)
- Poor Richard's Almanack (1733–1758)
- Thackers Indian Directory (1864–1960)
- Wisden Cricketers' Almanack (1864–present)
- Your Name Almanac (1934–present)

== Astronomical almanacs ==
- Air Almanac
- Astronomical Almanac
- Astronomical Phenomena
- The Astronomical Pocket Diary (1987–present)
- Multiyear Interactive Computer Almanac
- The Nautical Almanac (1767–present under various titles; prepared by U.S. Naval Observatory and Her Majesty's Nautical Almanac Office since 1958)
- Star Almanac for Land Surveyors

== Astrological almanacs ==
- Panjika: name of a number of Jyotisha almanacs:
  - Vishuddha Siddhanta Panjika
  - Gupta Press Panjika
- Raphael's Ephemeris, W. Foulsham & Company Limited

== Fictional almanacs ==
- Ankh-Morpork Almanack and Book of Days, from various Discworld novels (a version has been published as The Discworld Almanak)
- Gray's Sports Almanac, featured in Back to the Future Part II
- Klepp's Almenak, a travel guide to the islands of the Abarat from The Books of Abarat novels by Clive Barker

== Almanac calculators ==
- Kanippayyur Shankaran Namboodiripad
- Jacob de Gelder
- Isaac Haringhuysen
- Dirck Jansz van Dam
- J. van Dam
- Jan Albertsz van Dam
- Meyndert van Dam
- Dirck Rembrantsz van Nierop
- Pieter Rembrantsz van Nierop
- Mattheus van Nispen

== Satirical almanacs ==
- The Areas of My Expertise (2005)

== Sports almanacs ==
- Athletic Almanac by Spalding Athletic Library
- Ayres' Lawn Tennis Almanack and Tournament Guide
- Dunlop Lawn Tennis Annual and Almanack

== See also ==
- American almanacs
