= Robert Cross =

Robert Cross or Crosse may refer to:

- Rob Cross (born 1990), English darts player
- Rob Cross (basketball), American basketball coach
- Robert Cross (footballer) (1914–?), Scottish footballer
- Robert Cross (Canadian politician), mayor of Victoria, British Columbia, 1994–1999
- Robert Craigie Cross (1911–2000), professor of logic at Aberdeen University
- Robert Thomas Cross (1850–1923), British astrologer
- Robert J. Cross (1803–1873), American pioneer and member of the Illinois General Assembly
- Bobby Cross (1931–1989), American football player
- Robert Crosse (theologian) (1606–1683), English theologian
- Robert Crosse (MP) (died 1611), English politician

== See also ==
- Roberts cross, a technique used in image processing and computer vision for edge detection
- Robert Cross Smith (1795–1832), British astrologer
