= Jayraj Salgaokar =

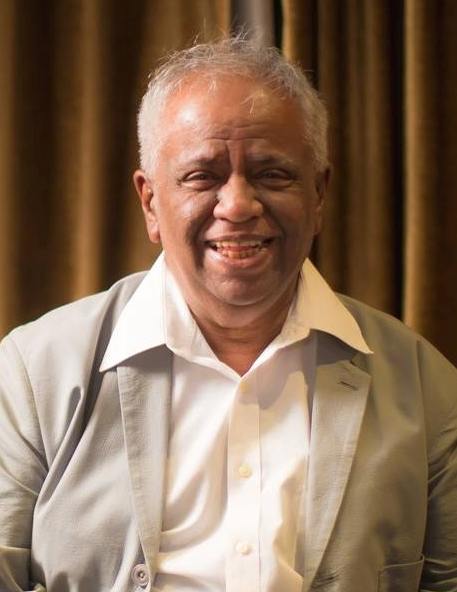
- Jayraj Salgaokar
- Born: 3 June 1954 (age 72); India
- Occupations: Writer, publisher and managing director of Kalnirnay
- Writing career
- Language: Marathi, English, Hindi
- Notable works: The Gorakhnath Enlightenment, समव्यस्त, कशासाठी कुठवर, जगप्रवाह, पैसा आणि मध्यमवर्ग, नवा गुटेनबर्ग, अजिंक्य योद्धा बाजीराव, कर्झनकाळ,

Jayraj Salgaokar (born 3 June 1954) is a writer, publisher and the managing director of the almanac Kalnirnay.

Jayraj Salgaokar's father, Jayant Salgaonkar, set up Kalnirnay in 1973. Some sources describe Jayraj Salgaokar as a co-founder.
