= Kamal Shedge =

Indian typographer and type designer (1935–2020)

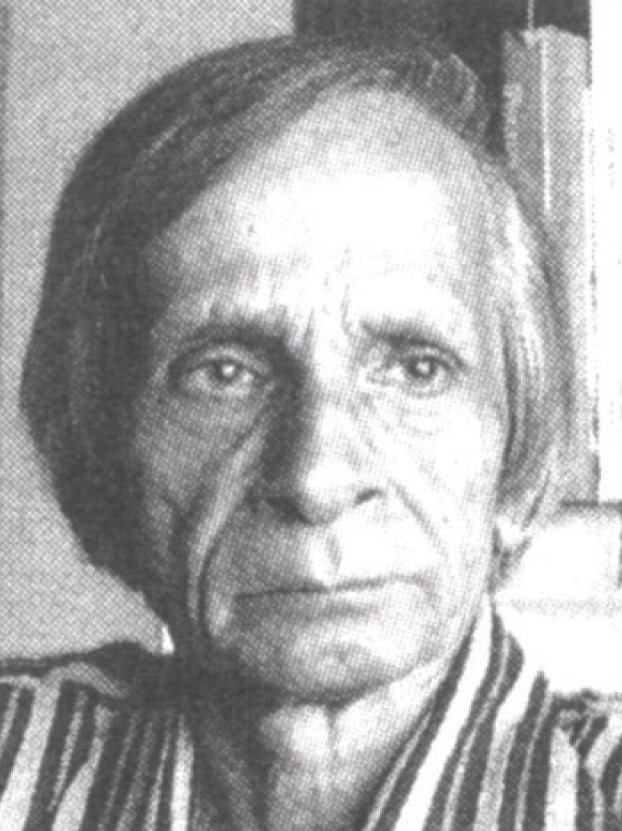
- Born: 22 June 1935; Bombay, British India
- Died: 4 July 2020 (aged 85); Mumbai, Maharashtra
- Known for: Typography

Kamal Shedge (22 June 1935 – 4 July 2020) was an Indian typographer and type designer. He is well known for his title designs and logos for numerous Marathi theatre plays, periodicals, newspapers, Hindi and Marathi films, book covers and record labels.

== Early life ==
Shedge was born on 22 June 1935 in Girgaon area of Bombay. He completed his education at the Orient High School in Girgaon. From an early age, Shedge was interested in reading, copied figures from magazines like Filmfare and created innovative letters. This is how he learned some basics of art as he did not study art formally at any art institute.

Shedge wanted to become a story writer. Although, it became difficult to pursue this field after his poor performance in the high school exams. At that time, his father worked as a calligrapher in the art department of The Times of India. He asked him to join his field of work. Initially, Shedge's non-design background came across as an administration hurdle. It was only later that Walter Langhammer, then head of art department intervened after seeing his work and made way for him to join. Thereby in 1955, Shedge began working in the art department of the Times of India. He was given small jobs to start with, which included completing the sketches of senior artists in the department.

== Career ==
In 1959, Ramesh Sanzgiri joined the Times of India as the art director. He provided Shedge with insights about how to design a title rather than just putting together a combination of letters. Shedge then created designs for headlines in magazines such as Filmfare, Femina and Madhuri. His artistic prowess gained prominence with the launch of the Maharashtra Times in 1962. He had designed the masthead for the daily which set a benchmark for layout design in newspapers.

During this time, advertising in media was expanding to Indian languages. However, little variety of lettering in Devanagari script was available at the time. In order to accomplish this task, it was necessary to have a transliteration in Devanagari script that could communicate the same meaning as English. Shedge introduced Devanagari alphabets with different weights (bold, light), similar to the serif and sans-serif alphabets in English. This completely changed the world of lettering in advertising. His work was a precursor to the fonts we see on the computer today.

=== Theatre titles ===
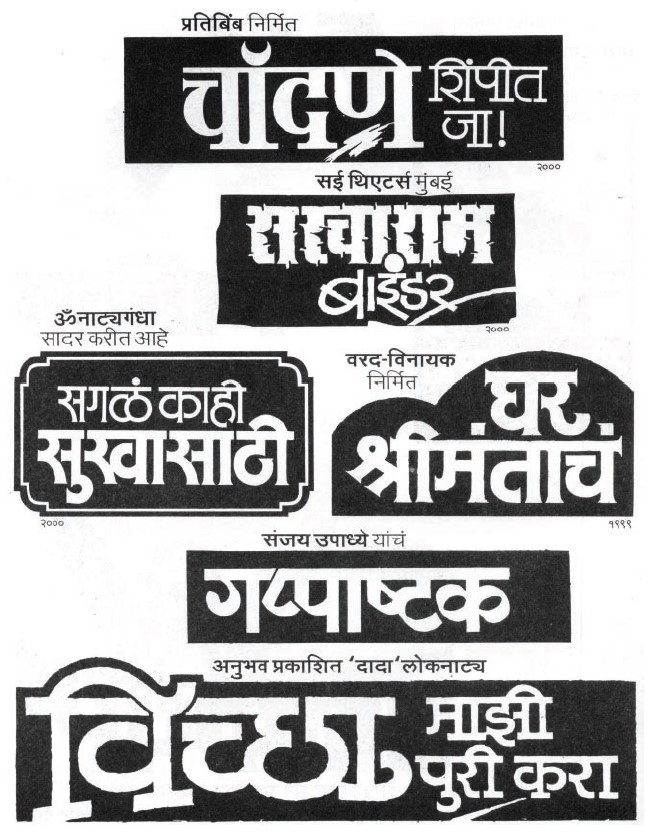
Title designs for Marathi plays by Kamal Shedge

Shedge played a key role in changing the face of play advertisements in Marathi theatre. His first opportunity to design a theatre title came about in 1962. However, he gained prominence few years later with his design for the play Matsyagandha. Around this time, Shedge got an opportunity to work for Marathi theatre artist Mohan Wagh. The latter had started a drama production house called Chandralekha which staged many Marathi dramas. Since their first play, Shedge had created publicity material for them. From 1965 onward, his work has been part of plays like Raigadala Jevha Jaag Yete, Garambicha Bapu, Swami, Lagnachi Bedi, to modern hits like Amar Photo Studio. He provided a brand identity to the play that not only improved the tastes of the audience but also drew them to the theatres.

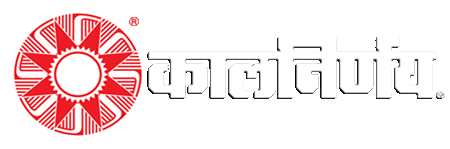
Kalnirnay logo and typography designed by Kamal Shedge

=== Logo designs ===
In 1974, Shedge was approached by Jayant Salgaonkar to design the logo for Kalnirnay, a calendar-almanac in Marathi. It is now produced in several Indian languages but the Marathi version continues to feature the logo and numerals that Shedge had designed. He had also made logos for periodicals like Maher, Deepavali, Kirloskar and Chanderi.

=== Movie titles ===
Shedge had created titles for a number of Marathi movies like Veer Savarkar (2001), Fakta Ladh Mhana (2011) and Kaksparsh (2012). Given his proficiency in multiple scripts, he was approached by film producers to adapt English titles in regional languages. Dilwale Dulhania Le Jayenge (1995), Devdas (2002), Bhool Bhulaiyaa (2007) and Saawariya (2007) are some of the films where he adapted the English design in Hindi. Occasionally, he also designed titles in both the scripts, like the film Kites (2010) or the titles in Urdu style for Umrao Jaan (2006).

=== Other works ===
Additionally, Shedge also designed book covers, cassettes and record labels. He has created record covers for noted singers like Bhimsen Joshi and Lata Mangeshkar.

== Later life ==
Shedge retired from the Times of India in 1990 and continued freelance work. He published three books, Majhi Akshargatha (1995), Chitrakshara (2002) and Kamalakshara (2009) which discuss about his works and career. He also organized several exhibitions of his calligraphic works which were well received.

== Death ==
Shedge died in Mumbai on 4 July 2020 at the age of 85.
