= Dunlop Lawn Tennis Annual and Almanack =

- Editors: A. Wallis Myers (1908–1939); G.P. Hughes (1946–1958)
- Original title: Ayres' Lawn Tennis Almanack and Tournament Guide
- Language: English
- Subject: Tennis
- Genre: Sports annual, Almanack
- Publisher: F.H. Ayres Ltd. (1908–1938); Dunlop Sports Co. (1939–1958)
- Publication date: 1908–1958
- Publication place: United Kingdom
- Media type: Print
- Pages: c. 500–700 pages (varies by edition)

The Dunlop Lawn Tennis Annual and Almanackwas a British annual tennis publication founded in 1908 as Ayres' Lawn Tennis Almanack and Tournament Guide. It continued in print as hardback book until 1938. In 1939 it changed to a softcover book format (paperback with pictorial card covers) to make it more affordable until 1958, when it was discontinued.

== Editors ==
- Arthur Wallis Myers (1908–1939)
- G.P. Hughes (1946–1958)

== Contributors ==
=== Ayres' ===
- Max Decugis
  Foreign correspondent continental Europe and features writer of French Notes 1920s)
- Francis Russell Burrow (1916-1936) (Wimbledon referee)
- Harry Scrivener (1919-1936)
  Principal tournaments, reviews, reports, statistics, regional events.

=== Dunlop ===
- Adrian Quist
- Althea Gibson
- Budge Patty
- Dick Savitt
- Doris Hart
- Frank Sedgman
- Harry Hopman
- H.A. Sabelli (Secretary LTA)
- Jaroslav Drobny
- Lew Hoad
- Louise Brough
- Margaret Osborne duPont
- Maureen Connolly
- Philippe Chatrier (Tennis de France)
- S.M. Farmer (British regional events data and results)
- Shirley Fry
- Ted Schroeder
- Tony Mottram

== World rankings ==
- Arthur Wallis Myers (1908-1939)
- Sir F. Gordon Lowe (1939)
- Pierre Gillou (1946)
- John Olliff (1947–1951)
- Lance Tingay (1952–1958).

Reproduced rankings from the relevant contributors newspaper annual rankings.
