= Moore State Park =

State park in Worcester County, Massachusetts

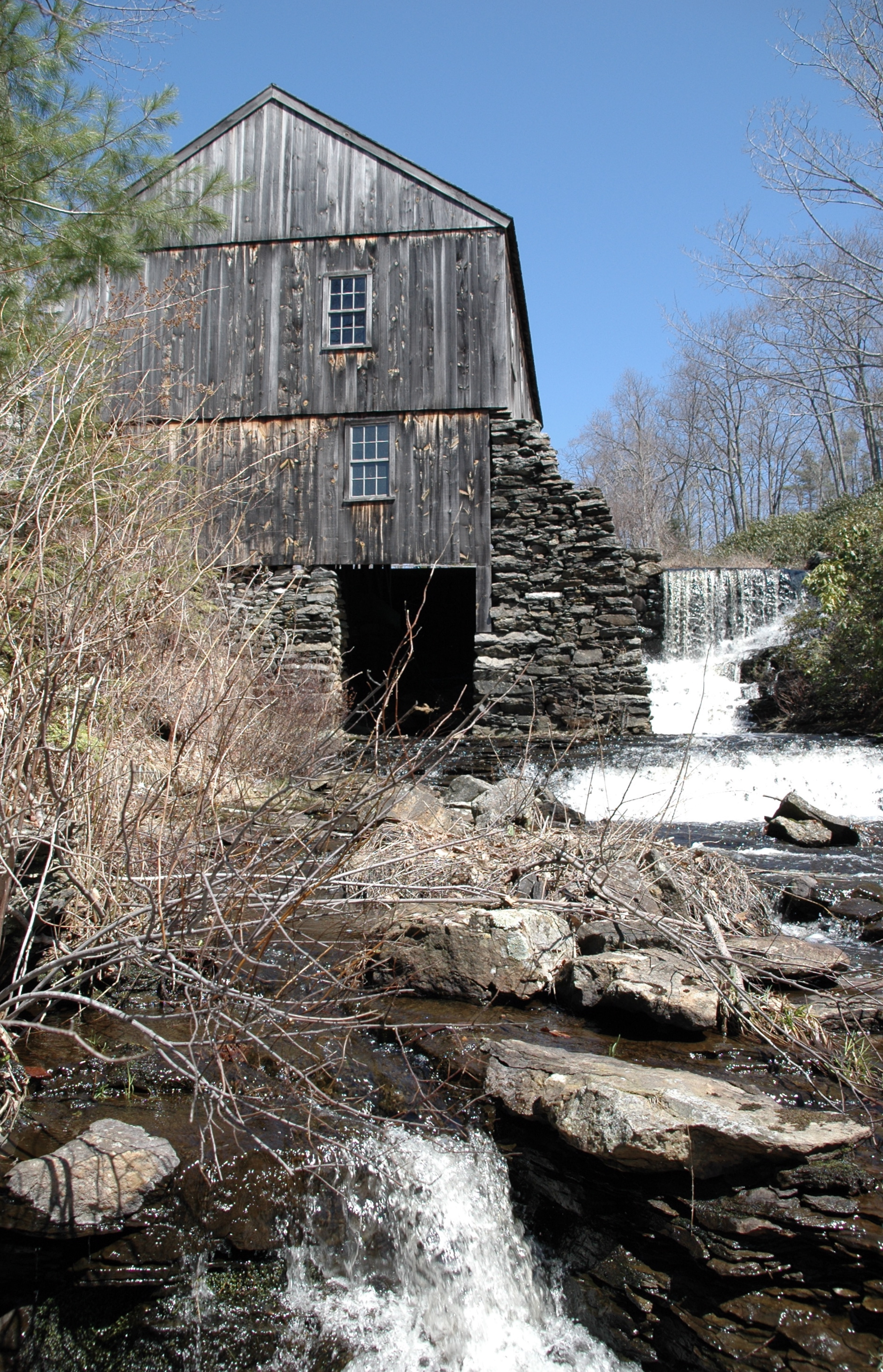
- Sawmill at Moore State Park

- Location within Massachusetts Location within the United States
- Location: Paxton, Massachusetts, United States
- Coordinates: 42°19′02″N 71°57′07″W
- Area: 737 acres (298 ha)
- Elevation: 997 ft (304 m)
- Administrator: Massachusetts Department of Conservation and Recreation
- Website: Official website
- Moore State Park Historic District
- U.S. National Register of Historic Places
- U.S. Historic district
- Nearest city: Paxton, Massachusetts
- Architectural style: Early Republic
- NRHP reference No.: 04000535
- Added to NRHP: May 21, 2004

Moore State Park is a 737-acre (298 ha) public recreation area located in the town of Paxton, Massachusetts, United States, portions of which were listed on the National Register of Historic Places as the Moore State Park Historic District in 2004. Features of the state park include historical building foundations, a restored sawmill, Eames Pond, waterfalls and mill chutes as well as abundant azaleas, rhododendrons, and mountain laurel. The park is managed by the Massachusetts Department of Conservation and Recreation.

== History ==
A portion of the land within Moore State Park was once the site of at least five 18th- and 19th-century watermills that were powered by Turkey Hill Brook, which cascades 90 feet over a 400-foot run. The first mills on the site were a gristmill and sawmill built as early as 1747. Visible remnants of the mill village include a triphammer, quarry, schoolhouse and tavern. In the early 20th century, the property became a private estate, large portions of which were subsequently included in the state park.

In 2003, park staff working with the American Chestnut Foundation created a large plantation of experimentally bred chestnut trees as part of efforts to return blight-resistant American chestnut trees to the United States.

== Activities and amenities ==
Park recreational opportunities include canoeing, fishing, hunting, hiking, cross-country skiing, picnicking and interpretive programs.

== See also ==
- National Register of Historic Places listings in Worcester County, Massachusetts
