= W. Foulsham & Company Limited =

British publishing company

W. Foulsham & Company
- Founded: 1819
- Founder: William Foulsham
- Country of origin: United Kingdom
- Headquarters location: Marlow, Buckinghamshire
- Distribution: Macmillan Distribution
- Publication types: Books
- Official website: www.foulsham.com

W. Foulsham & Company Limited is a British publisher founded by William Foulsham in 1819. It is the current publisher of Old Moore's Almanack, an annual publication first published in 1697, and of Raphael's Ephemeris, which Robert Thomas Cross acquired in the 1870s and edited until his death in 1913.

In 1892 the firm was located at 4 Pilgrim Street, London E.C. and in 1926 and 1932 it was publishing from 10-11 Red Lion Court, Fleet Street, London E.C.4.

The firm has published a number of book series over the years, including the Do-It-Yourself Series, Foulsham's Pocket Library, Foulsham's Practical Manuals, the Mayflower Library, and the Pilgrims Library.

Foulsham republished Bram Stoker's last novel from 1911, The Lair of the White Worm, in 1925 in an abridged and rewritten form.
