= Stephen Knott =

American professor of history

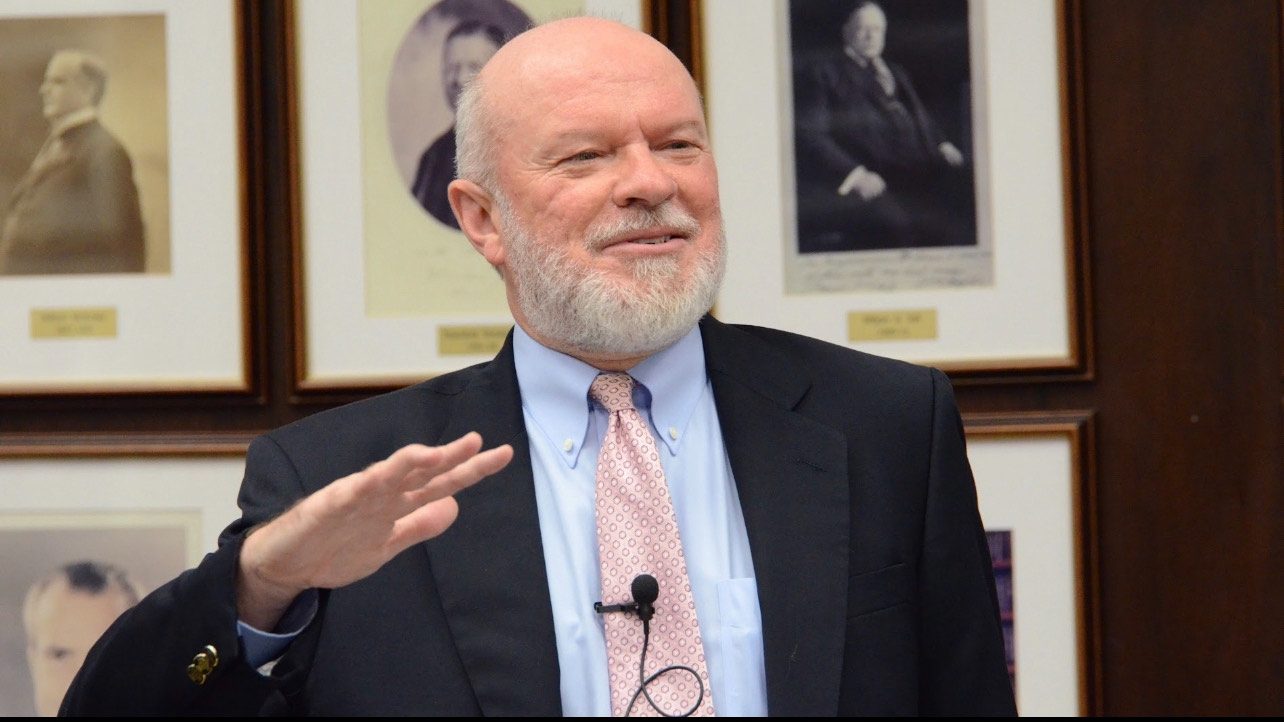
- Born: Stephen F. Knott; 1957 (age 68–69); Paxton, Massachusetts

Academic background
- Education: Boston College; Assumption University
- Website: stephenfknott.com

Stephen F. Knott (born 1957) is an American professor of history and national security. He is the Thomas and Mabel Guy Professor in American History and Government at Ashland University and an emeritus Professor in the Department of National Security Affairs at the United States Naval War College in Newport, RI. Prior to accepting his position at the Naval War College, Knott was co-chair of the Presidential Oral History Program at the Miller Center of Public Affairs at the University of Virginia.

== Early life and education ==
Knott was born in Paxton, Massachusetts, in 1957. He graduated from Assumption College in 1979 and began work at the John F. Kennedy Presidential Library in October, 1979. He left the Library in 1985 to pursue a Ph.D. in political science at Boston College, which he was awarded in 1991. Knott has taught at the University of New Hampshire, at Quinnipiac University, and the United States Air Force Academy, where he was part of the first group of permanent civilian faculty at the academy.

== Career ==
In 2001, he joined the research faculty at the Miller Center of Public Affairs at the University of Virginia, conducting oral history interviews for the Ronald Reagan, George H. W. Bush, William J. Clinton, and George W. Bush oral history projects, as well as teaching in UVA's Department of Politics. He also helped launch the Edward M. Kennedy Oral History Project in December 2004, where he was responsible for conducting the bulk of the interviews between that date and the summer of 2007. He became a professor of National Security Affairs at the United States Naval War College in July 2007 until his retirement in December 2022. Knott is the author or co-author of ten books dealing with the American presidency and the history of the early American Republic, as well as essays and op-eds in newspapers including The Washington Post and The Wall Street Journal and numerous academic journals. He has delivered many public lectures, a number of which have appeared on C-SPAN.

== Books ==
- Coming to Terms with John F. Kennedy, The University Press of Kansas, October 2022
- Editor, American Foreign Policy to 1899: Core Documents, Ashbrook Press, October 2021.
- The Lost Soul of the American Presidency: The Decline into Demagoguery and the Prospects for Renewal, The University Press of Kansas, November 2019.
- Washington and Hamilton: The Alliance That Forged America, Co-author, Sourcebooks, September 2015.
- The Evolution of the Executive and Executive Power in the American Republic, Co-author, Foreign Policy Research Institute E-Book, November 2014.
- Rush to Judgment: George W. Bush, the War on Terror, and His Critics, The University Press of Kansas, March 2012.
- At Reagan’s Side: Insiders’ Recollections from Sacramento to the White House, Co-author, Rowman and Littlefield, May 2009.
- The Reagan Years, Co-author, Facts on File, April 2005.
- Alexander Hamilton and the Persistence of Myth, The University Press of Kansas, February 2002.
- Secret and Sanctioned: Covert Operations and the American Presidency, Oxford University Press, April 1996.
