= Harriet Ware =

American teacher

Harriet Ware (July 12, 1799 – June 26, 1847) was an American teacher. She taught in India Point in 1832 and later founded Children's Friend Society in 1835.

== Early life ==
Harriet Ware was born on July 12, 1799, in Paxton, Massachusetts. Ware was the eldest daughter of Puritanical parents and had schooling year round. She began studying religion and in 1819 moved to Franklin, Massachusetts. She began teaching at a school in Union, but was then summoned to teach at a school in a neighborhood of Providence, India Point.

== Life at India Point ==
In the spring of 1832, Harriet Ware began her teachings at India Point. India Point was a section of houses mostly owned by oystermen and fishermen that was removed from the rest of the population. Through a society if benevolent ladies, Harriet Ware was requested to teach in this area in great need of an instructor. When Harriet Ware arrived at this suburb, she was told by children that they would “knock her brains out”.

Ware was a dedicated teacher, making sure every one of her approximate forty students was learning and understanding the course material. Her dedication helped shift the children’s attitudes towards learning. While Harriet was aware of the work she accomplished, she gave credit to the Lord for guiding her and was extremely modest of her own impact she had in transforming the lives of the children at India Point. She taught day classes for the children and also evening classes for the adults. “Some sailors and their wives, some young men who cannot, or rather could not, read even the alphabet, others who cannot write, and some who are studying arithmetic…They are willing to be taught and I am willing they should be ”.

The progress was not easy and the school almost did not survive. Having trouble providing supplies for the school, Ware thought she would have to close it down before the winter. Then, a stranger came in one day to help out and later provided assistance of Ware’s school. She also received kindness from the Baptist minister, Mr. Phillips. A woman mentioned as Mrs. W. (wife of an intelligent and elite gentleman) was kind to Ware and provided funds to help equip the classroom and purchase other supplies. An “invaluable assistant” is also mentioned as coming to India Point to initially set up, but staying far longer than expected. With the generous help Ware received, she was able to keep the school afloat.

Realizing the aggressive environment, Harriet thought if the children were removed from this environment, they might have a better chance of becoming higher citizens of society. Ware was busy constantly providing teaching, lessons, and readings to keep the children busy and away from temptations. She gave up her leisure time to guide children away from those who would undo her work. Because Ware strived to make a difference in these children’s lives during the day, she found that progress was at a standstill when the children returned home to an aggressive and unhealthy environment with the improper influence of their parents. In order for Ware to break these children’s bad habits, such as swearing and aggression, she believed these children would have to be completely removed from India Point. With parents placing their confidence in her, Ware was able to remove children to happy, Christian homes that would exert a positive influence on the lives of these children.

Harriet Ware was at India Point for a total of three years. She made much progress here, helping citizens become literate and also find God. Because her school was transforming badly behaved children, she later expanded her idea to become the founder of the Children's Friend Society of Rhode Island, which later became Children's Friend and Service and is a thriving child welfare agency in Providence, Rhode Island to this day.

== Death ==
On June 26, 1847, Ware died of cancer, stating "I feel that my work on Earth is done".
