= Francis Moore (astrologer) =

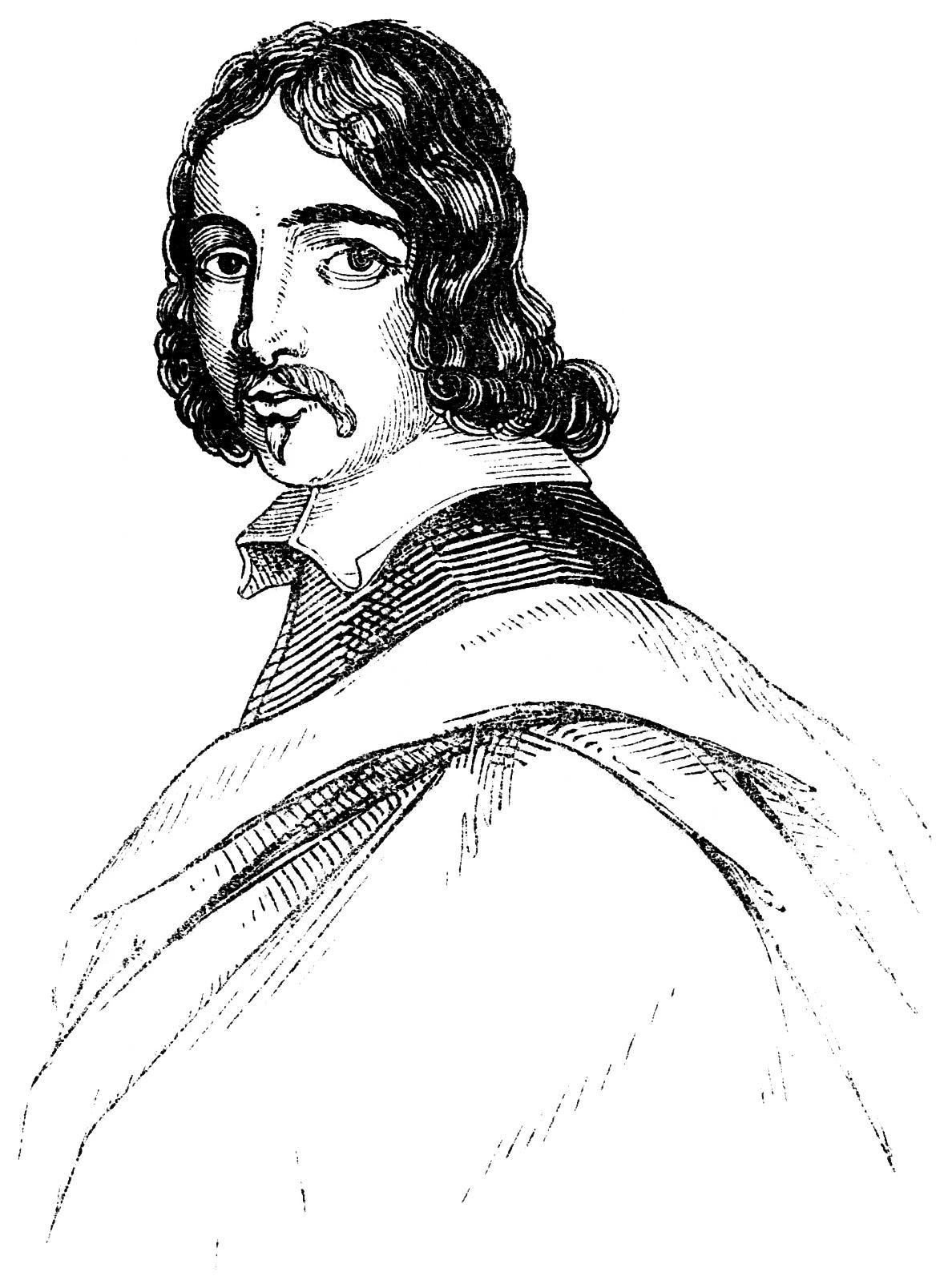
Francis Moore

Francis Moore (29 January 1657 – 1715) was an English physician and astrologer who wrote and published what later became Old Moore's Almanack.

He was born into poverty in Bridgnorth, reputedly in one of the cave dwellings in the vicinity of St Mary's Steps. Moore was self-educated, learning to read by himself, and became a physician and astrologer. He served at the court of Charles II of England.

The almanac that bears his name was first published in 1697, originally giving weather and astrological predications, and is still published annually.
