= Robert Thomas Cross =

Robert Thomas Cross (born 15 May 1850 in Worstead, d. 1923) was a British astrologer.

Cross was one in a series of editors of Raphael's Ephemeris, started by Robert Cross Smith in 1827, who all took the pseudonym Raphael. Robert Thomas Cross is often confused with Robert Cross Smith due to the similarity in name and the identical pseudonym.

== Life ==
Cross was originally named Frederick Robert Cross, but dropped the "Frederick". He began studying astrology quite young and by the age of twenty-five, already married with two sons, he was teaching astrology and accepting clients, and soon became the editor of The Prophetic Messenger, which he renamed to Raphael's Ephemeris. In the 1870s he obtained the copyright to Raphael's Ephemeris, which the Cross family then owned until 1985 when it was sold to W. Foulsham & Co, the publisher.

In Raphael's Ephemeris for 1913 he wrote: "Nothing has prospered with me except astrology ... I have succeeded beyond my expectations...". In 1893, Cross's almanac sold 200,000 copies. His "Guide to Astrology", published in two volumes in 1877 and 1879 was widely used by astrologers for many years.

In 1895 the Astrologer's Magazine quoted Cross for his support of the idea of forming an astrological society. On 14 January 1896 Alan Leo founded a society with himself as the first president and Cross as vice-president. Raphael's Ephemeris continues to be published, with W. Foulsham & Company Limited.

A followup book under the pseudonym Raphael titled The Key To Astrology was published in 1896.
