= J. Gruber's Hagerstown Town & Country Almanack =

Almanac published by Gruber Almanack, LLC

J. Gruber's Hagerstown Town & Country Almanack is an almanac published by Gruber Almanack, LLC in Mercersburg, Pennsylvania. Beginning in 1797, it was created by John Gruber and Daniel May, making it the second-oldest almanac to be published in the United States, behind the Old Farmer's Almanac. It is currently the oldest almanac still published by the direct descendants of the founder, being edited by the great-great-great-great-great-grandson of John Gruber, Charles W. Fisher Jr. From 1969 to 2019, Bill O'Toole, a retired math professor, was the almanac's "weather prognosticator", using both solar and lunar charting as well as a variety of computer programs to predict the weather. A short documentary of the almanac was created in 2012.

Germans made up the majority of Washington County, Maryland's population in the late 1700s and Daniel Hiester urged Gruber to create a German-language newspaper for Hagerstown, Maryland, which he started in 1796. The almanac was originally published in German and an English version was added in 1822. German-language editions ceased being published in 1917. It contains agricultural, meteorological, and astrological information as well as folk remedies, local poetry, and other forms of traditional community wisdom. The governor of Maryland, William Thomas Hamilton, was known to consult the publication prior to holding public events.

The almanac has been imitated and copied several times over the years. On February 28, 1879, the Baltimore City Circuit Court approved an injunction against Caroline V. Robertson to stop the publication of T. G. Robertson's Hagerstown Almanack, finding that it imitated the Gruber Almanack. In 1906 the Gruber Almanack Company successfully sued Othio Swendley for representing his almanac as Gruber's.
