= David Goodman (Medal of Honor) =

United States Army Medal of Honor recipient

- Born: 1846; Paxton, Massachusetts, US
- Died: Unknown
- Military career
- Allegiance: United States
- Branch: United States Army
- Rank: Private
- Units: Company L, 8th U.S. Cavalry
- Conflicts: Indian Wars
- Awards: Medal of Honor

David Goodman (born 1846) was an American military officer. He served as a private in the United States Army and a recipient of America's highest military decoration – the Medal of Honor – for his actions in the American Indian Wars of the western United States.

== Biography ==
David Goodman was born in 1846, in Paxton, Massachusetts. He served in Company L, 8th U.S. Cavalry as a private during the Indian Wars. On October 14, 1869, he was awarded the Medal of Honor for bravery during the skirmishes with the Apache at Lyry Creek, Arizona Territory. He was issued the Medal of Honor on March 3, 1870.

== Medal of Honor citation ==
- Rank and organization: Private, Company L, 8th U.S. Cavalry
- Place and date: At Lyry Creek, Arizona Territory, 14 October 1869.
- Entered service at: Unknown.
- Birth: Paxton, Massachusetts.
- Date of issue: 3 March 1870.

Citation:

"The President of the United States of America, in the name of Congress, takes pleasure in presenting the Medal of Honor to Private David Goodman, United States Army, for bravery in action on 14 October 1869, while serving with Company L, 8th U.S. Cavalry, in action at Lyry Creek, Arizona Territory."

== See also ==
- List of Medal of Honor recipients for the Indian Wars
