= Almanac =

Annual publication of prospective events

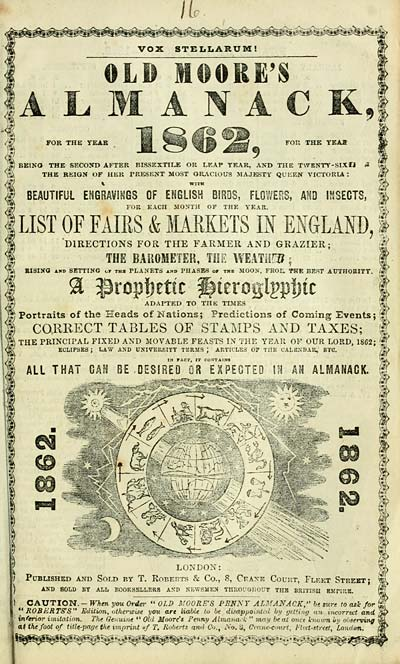
Old Moore's Almanack is an astrological almanac which has been published in Britain since 1697.

An almanac (historically spelled almanack) is a regularly published listing of a set of current information about one or multiple subjects. It includes information like weather forecasts, farmers' planting dates, tide tables, and other tabular data often arranged according to the calendar. Celestial figures and various statistics are found in almanacs, such as the rising and setting times of the Sun and Moon, dates of eclipses, hours of high and low tides, and religious festivals. The set of events noted in an almanac may be tailored for a specific group of readers, such as farmers, sailors, or astronomers.

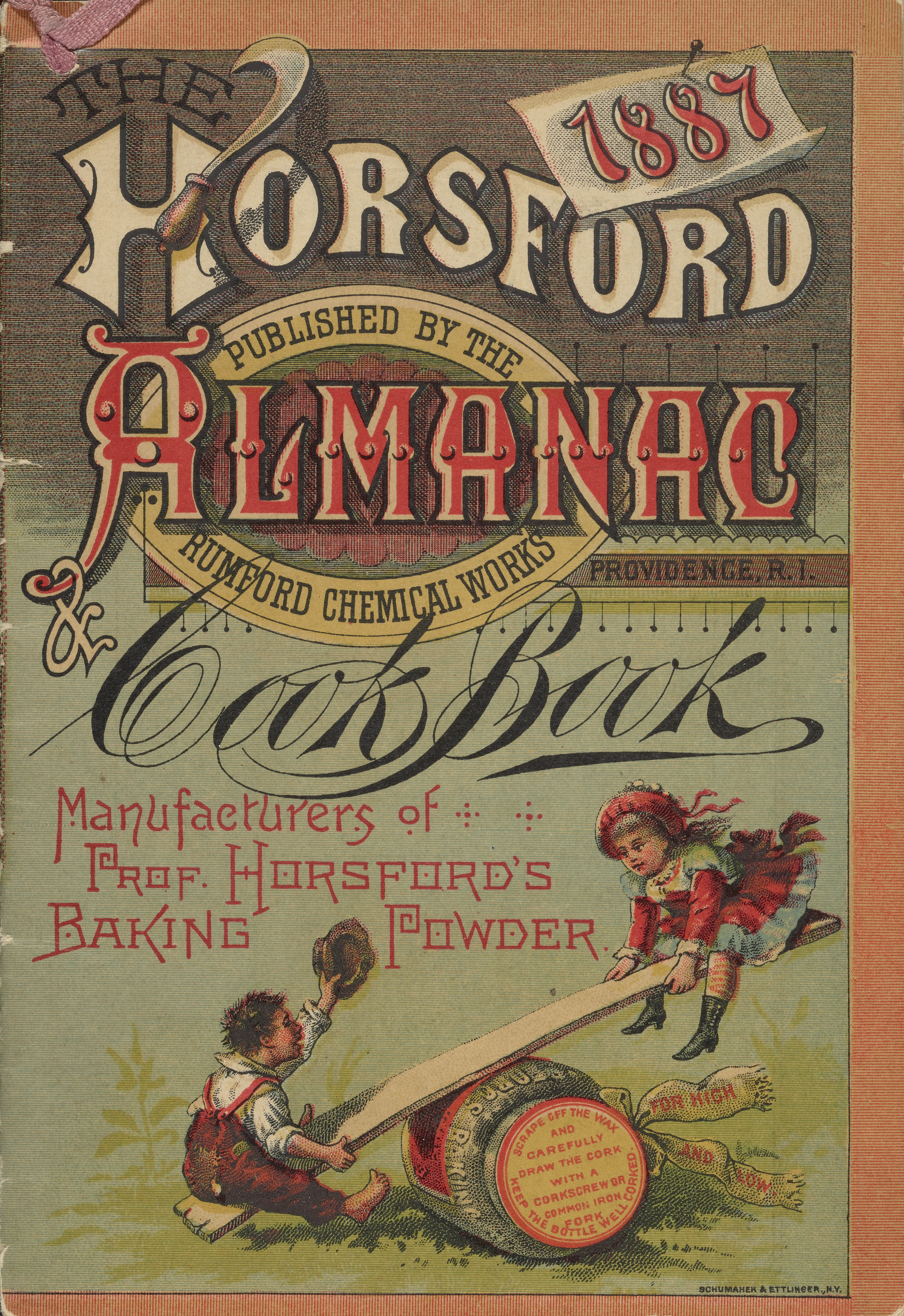
Cover of the Horsford 1887 almanac and cook book, published by Rumford Chemical Works, Providence, Rhode Island, US

== Origin of the phrase ==
The etymology of almanac is unclear. The earliest documented use of the word in something like its current sense is in Latin in 1267. Roger Bacon used it to mean a set of tables detailing movements of heavenly bodies including the Moon.

It has been suggested that the word almanac derives from a Greek word meaning calendar. However, that word appears only once in antiquity, by Eusebius who quotes Porphyry as to the Coptic Egyptian use of astrological charts (almenichiaká). The earliest almanacs were calendars that included agricultural, astronomical, or meteorological data. But it is highly unlikely Roger Bacon received the word from this etymology: "Notwithstanding the suggestive sound and use of this word (of which however the real form is very uncertain), the difficulties of connecting it historically either with the Spanish Arabic manākh, or with Medieval Latin almanach without Arabic intermediation, seem insurmountable."

One etymology report says "The ultimate source of the word is obscure. Its first syllable, al-, and its general relevance to medieval science and technology, strongly suggest an Arabic origin, but no convincing candidate has been found". Ernest Weekley similarly states of almanac: "First seen in Roger Bacon. Apparently from Spanish Arabic, al-manakh, but this is not an Arabic word....The word remains a puzzle." Walter William Skeat concludes that the construction of an Arabic origin is "not satisfactory". The Oxford English Dictionary similarly says "the word has no etymon in Arabic" but indirect circumstantial evidence "points to a Spanish Arabic al-manākh". The Oxford Dictionary of English says that the word origin is "via Old French and medieval Latin from Spanish Arabic al-manāk ('the calendar')".

The reason why the proposed Arabic word is speculatively spelled al-manākh is that the spelling occurred as "almanach", as well as almanac (and Roger Bacon used both spellings). The earliest use of the word was in the context of astronomy calendars. The Arabic word المناخ al-munākh has different meanings in contemporary Arabic than in classical Arabic usage. The word originally meant "the place where camels kneel [so riders and baggage can disembark]". In contemporary Arabic, the word means "climate".

The prestige of the Tables of Toledo and other medieval Arabic astronomy works at the time of the word's emergence in the West, together with the absence of the word in Arabic, suggest it may have been invented in the West and is pseudo-Arabic. At that time in the West, it would have been prestigious to attach an Arabic appellation to a set of astronomical tables. Also around that time, prompted by that motive, the Latin writer Pseudo-Geber wrote under an Arabic pseudonym. (The later alchemical word alkahest is known to be pseudo-Arabic.)

== History ==
=== Hemerologies and parapegmata ===
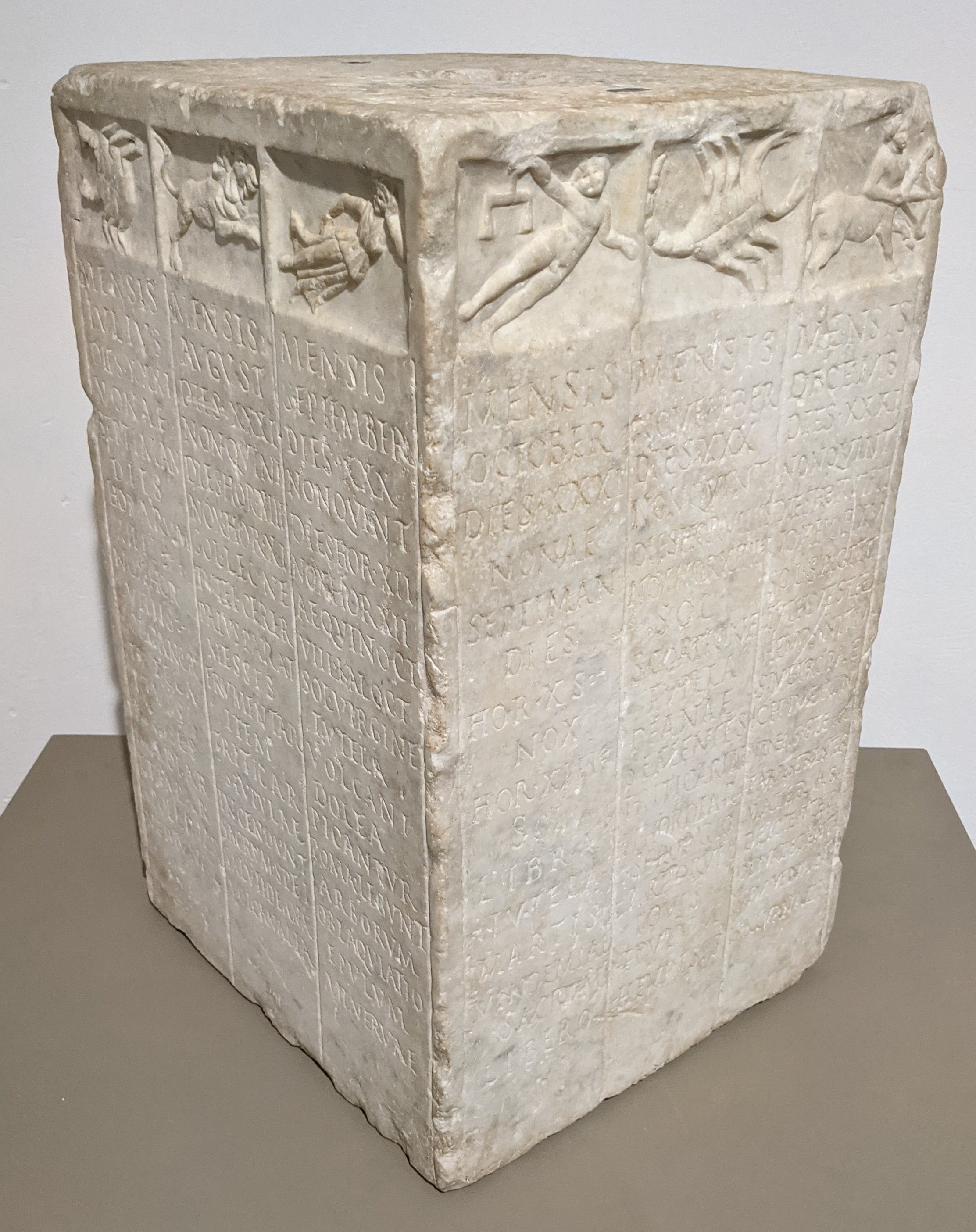
The 1st cent. Menologium Rusticum Colotianum, discovered in Rome and now held by the Archeological Museum in Naples

The earlier texts considered to be almanacs have been found in the Near East, dating back to the middle of the second millennium BC. They have been called generally hemerologies, from the Greek word hēmerologion, "calendar" (from hēmera, meaning "day"). Among them is the so-called Babylonian Almanac, which lists favorable and unfavorable days with advice on what to do on each of them. Successive variants and versions aimed at different readership have been found. Egyptian lists of good and bad moments, three times each day, have also been found. Many of these prognostics were connected with celestial events. The flooding of the Nile valley, a most important event in ancient Egypt, was expected to occur at the summer solstice, but as the civil calendar had exactly 365 days, over the centuries, the date was drifting in the calendar. (Note: The new year coincides with the summer solstice once in 1441 years, which is known as the sothic period.) The first heliacal rising of Sirius was used for its prediction and this practice, the observation of some star and its connecting to some event apparently spread.

The Greek almanac, known as parapegma, has existed in the form of an inscribed stone on which the days of the month were indicated by movable pegs inserted into bored holes, hence the name. There were also written texts and according to Diogenes Laërtius, Parapegma was the title of a book by Democritus. Ptolemy, the Alexandrian astronomer (2nd century) wrote a treatise, Phaseis—"phases of fixed stars and collection of weather-changes" is the translation of its full title—the core of which is a parapegma, a list of dates of seasonally regular weather changes, first appearances and last appearances of stars or constellations at sunrise or sunset, and solar events such as solstices, all organized according to the solar year. With the astronomical computations were expected weather phenomena, composed as a digest of observations made by various authorities of the past. Parapegmata had been composed for centuries. Ptolemy believed that astronomical phenomena caused the changes in seasonal weather; his explanation of why there was not an exact correlation of these events was that the physical influences of other heavenly bodies also came into play. Hence for him, weather prediction was a special division of astrology.

Surviving Roman menologia rustica combined schedules of solar information and agricultural activities throughout the year with the months' tutelary deities and major festivals. By the imperial period, each month was headed with illustrations of its chief astrological signs, matching Roman geoponical tracts that often combined guidance for the proper conditions for different activities with the stars present during that period rather than using the civil calendar.

=== Ephemerides, zijs and tables ===
The origins of the almanac can be connected to ancient Babylonian astronomy, when tables of planetary periods were produced in order to predict lunar and planetary phenomena. Similar treatises called Zij were later composed in medieval Islamic astronomy.

The modern almanac differs from Babylonian, Ptolemaic and Zij tables in the sense that "the entries found in the almanacs give directly the positions of the celestial bodies and need no further computation", in contrast to the more common "auxiliary astronomical tables" based on Ptolemy's Almagest. The earliest known almanac in this modern sense is the Almanac of Azarqueil written in 1088 by Abū Ishāq Ibrāhīm al-Zarqālī (Latinized as Arzachel) in Toledo, al-Andalus. The work provided the true daily positions of the sun, moon and planets for four years from 1088 to 1092, as well as many other related tables. A Latin translation and adaptation of the work appeared as the Tables of Toledo in the 12th century and the Alfonsine tables in the 13th century.

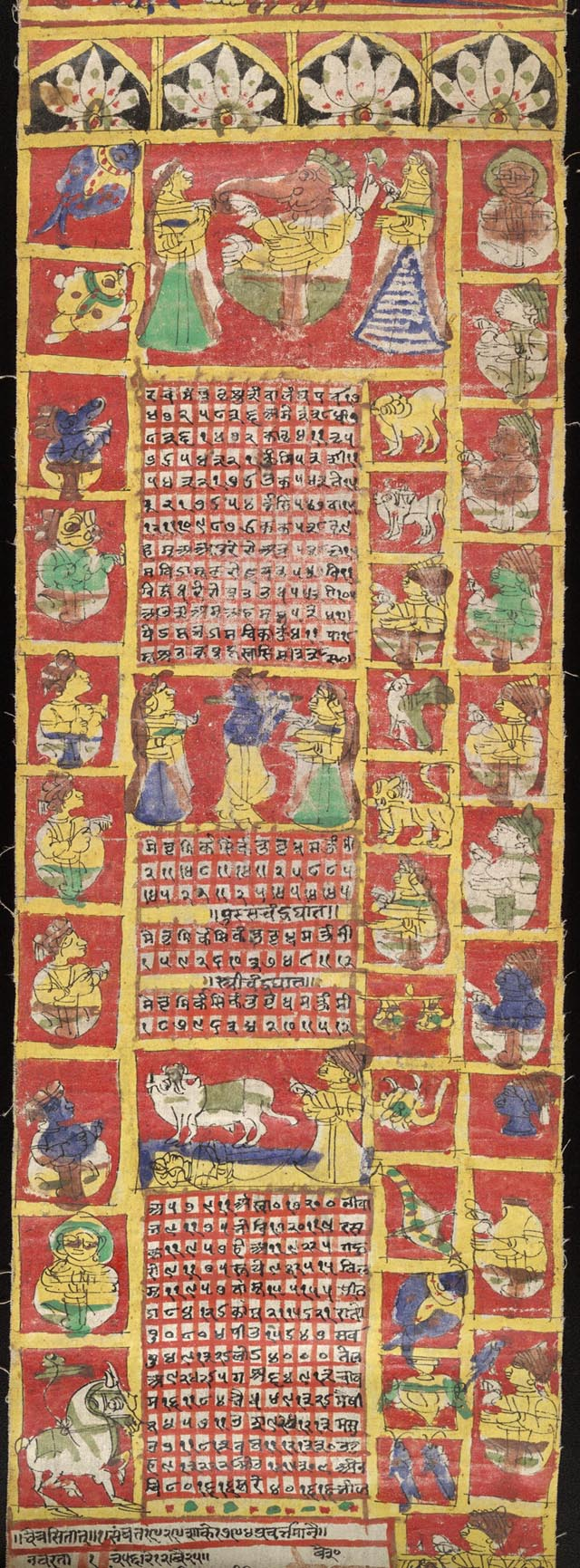
A page from the Almanac for the Hindu year 1871–72

=== Medieval examples ===
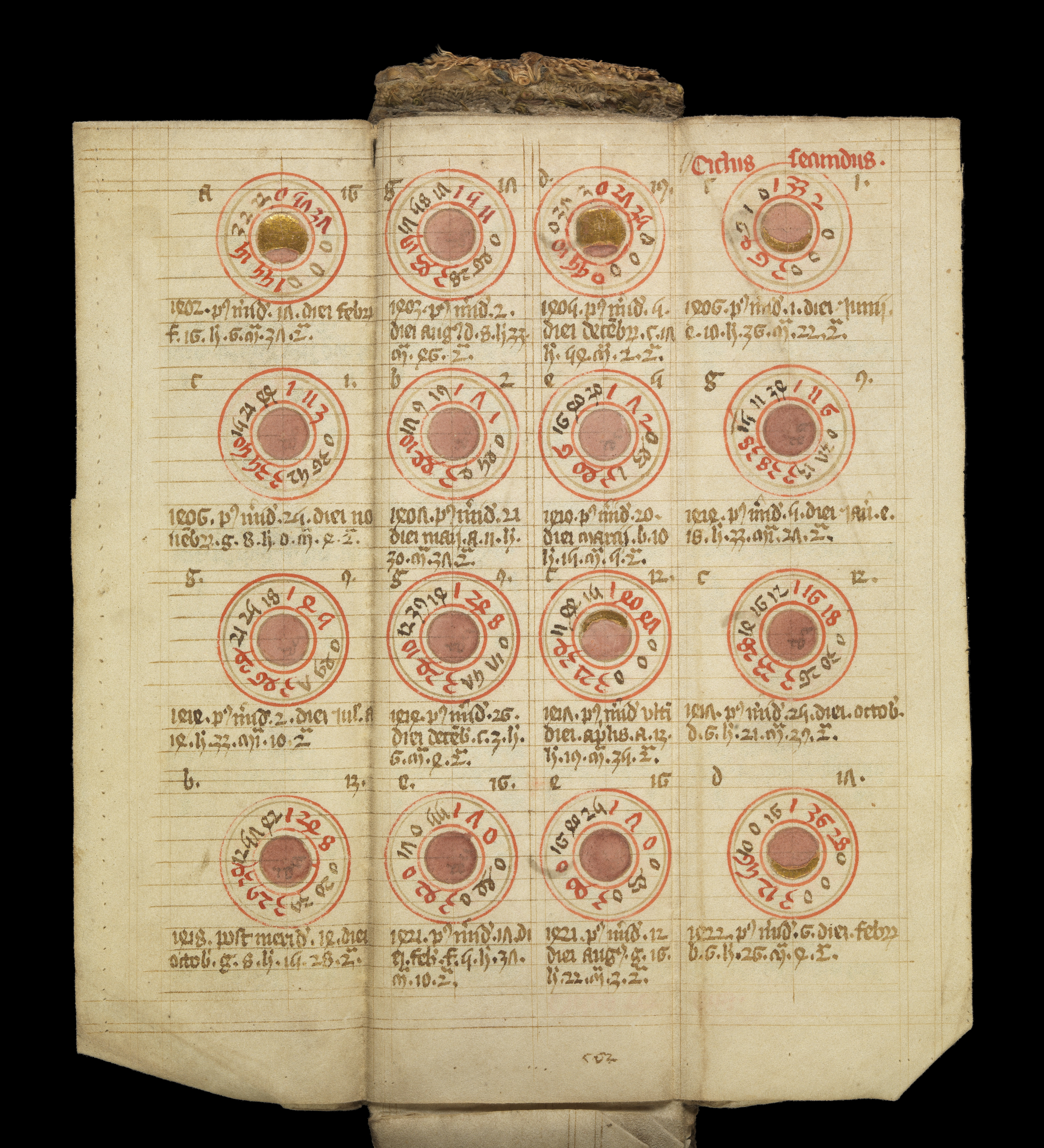
MS. 8932. Medieval folding almanac (15th century)

After almanacs were devised, people still saw little difference between predicting the movements of the stars and tides, and predicting the future in the divination sense. Early almanacs therefore contained general horoscopes, as well as natural information. An example is the folded almanac Western MS.8932 (Wellcome Collection, London), produced in England between 1387 and 1405, is a calendar with astrological tables and diagrams used by medical practitioners to harness astrological information relating to health. In 1150 Solomon Jarchus created such an almanac considered to be among the first modern examples. Copies of 12th century almanacs are found in the British Museum, and in the Universities of Oxford and Cambridge. In 1300, Petrus de Dacia created an almanac (Savilian Library, Oxford) the same year Roger Bacon, OFM, produced his own. In 1327 Walter de Elvendene created an almanac and later on John Somers of Oxford, in 1380. In 1386 Nicholas de Lynne, Oxford produced an almanac. In 1457 the first printed almanac was published at Mainz, by Gutenberg (eight years before the famous Bible). Regio-Montanus produced an almanac in 1472 (Nuremberg, 1472), which continued in print for several centuries. In 1497 the Sheapheard's Kalendar, translated from French (Richard Pynson) became the first almanac to be printed in English.

=== Early modern era ===
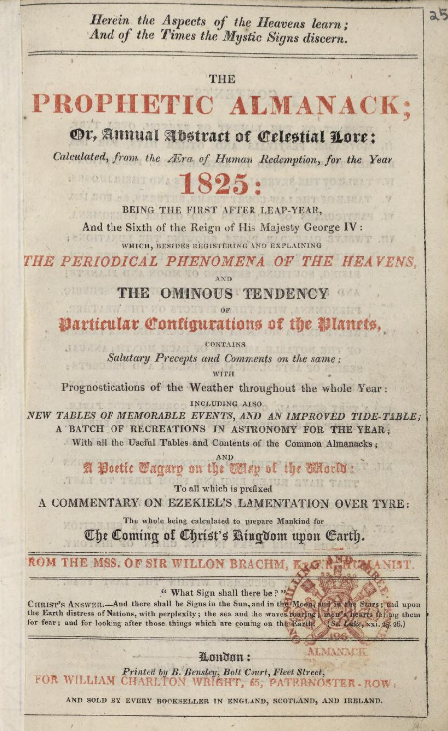
An English Prophetic Almanack, 1825

==== England ====
By the second half of the 16th century, yearly almanacs were being produced in England by authors such as Anthony Askham, Thomas Buckminster, John Dade and Gabriel Frende. In the 17th century, English almanacs were bestsellers, second only to the Bible; by the middle of the century, 400,000 almanacs were being produced annually (a complete listing can be found in the English Short Title Catalogue). Until its deregulation in 1775, the Stationers' Company maintained a lucrative monopoly over almanac publication in England. Richard Allestree (not to be confused with Richard Allestree (1621/22–1681), provost of Eton College) wrote one of the more popular English almanacs, producing yearly volumes from 1617 to 1643, but his is by no means the earliest or the longest-running almanac.

Works that satirized this type of publication appeared in the late 1500s. During the next century, a writer using the pseudonym of "Poor Richard, Knight of the Burnt Island" began to publish a series of such parodies that were entitled Poor Robin's Almanack. The 1664 issue of the series stated: "This month we may expect to hear of the Death of some Man, Woman, or Child, either in Kent or Christendom."

==== British America and United States ====
The first almanac printed in the Thirteen Colonies of British America was William Pierce's 1639 An Almanac Calculated for New England. The almanac was the first in a series of such publications that Stephen Daye, or Day, printed each year until 1649 in Cambridge, Massachusetts. The Cambridge/Boston area in Massachusetts soon became the first center in the colonies for the annual publication of almanacs, to be followed by Philadelphia during the first half of the eighteenth century.

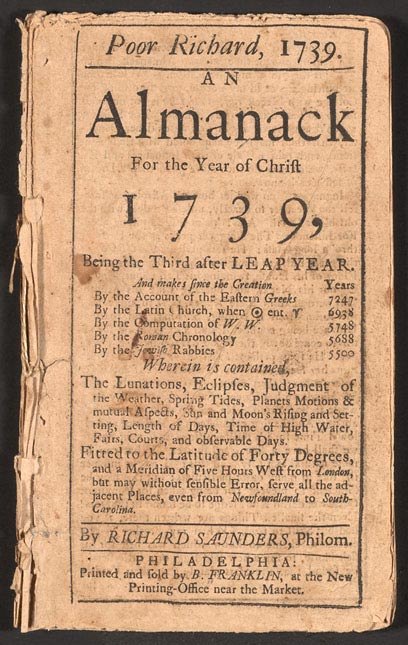
Title page of 1739 edition of Benjamin Franklin's Poor Richard's Almanack

Nathaniel Ames of Dedham, Massachusetts, issued his popular Astronomical Diary and Almanack in 1725 and annually after c. 1732. James Franklin published The Rhode Island Almanack by "Poor Robin" for each year from 1728 to 1735. James' brother, Benjamin Franklin, published his annual Poor Richard's Almanack in Philadelphia from 1732 to 1758.

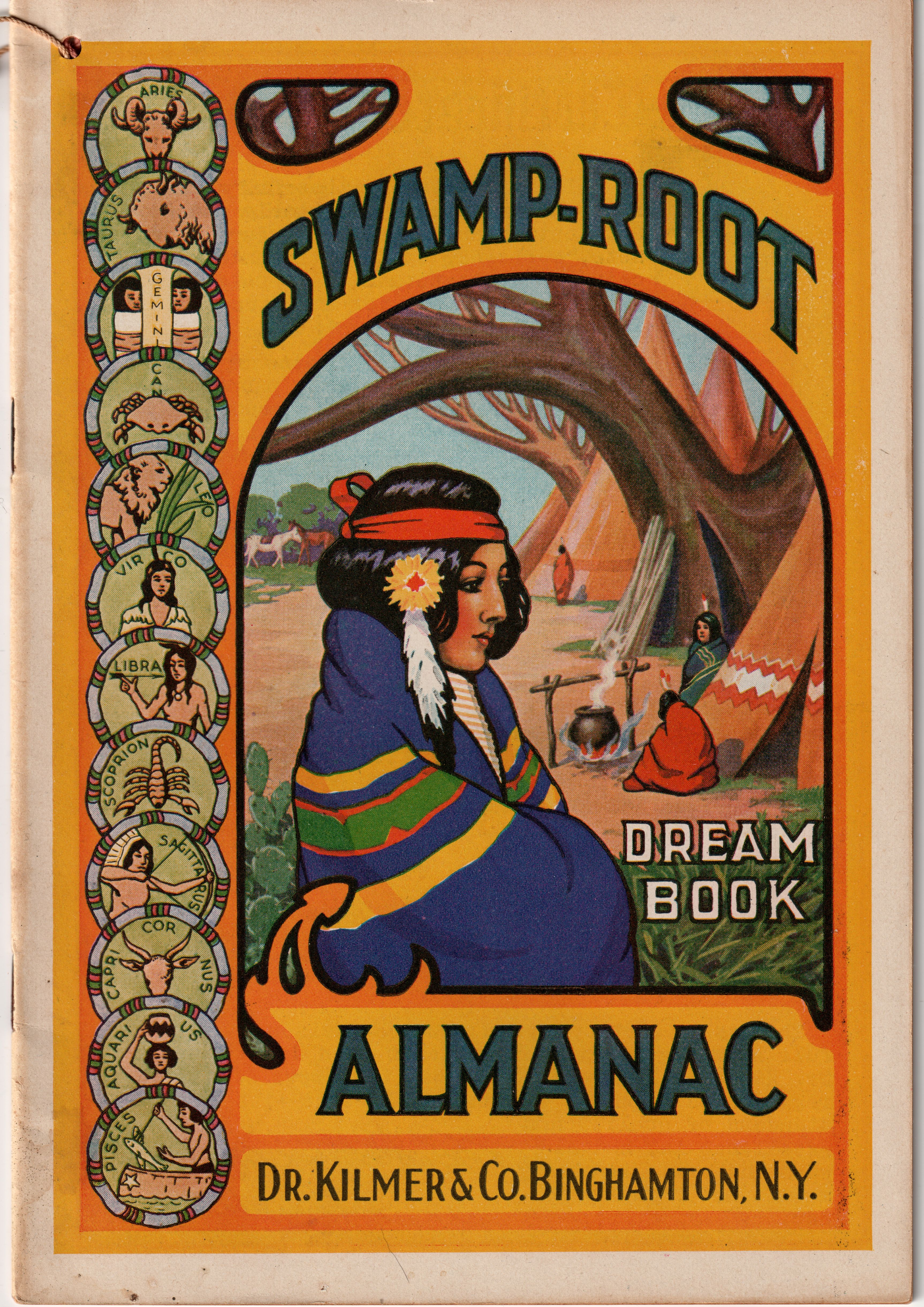
Swamp Root Almanac and Dream Book, Dr. Kilmer & Co of Binghamton -- an advertising almanac

Samuel Stearns of Paxton, Massachusetts, issued the North-American Almanack, published annually from 1771 to 1784, as well as the first American nautical almanac, The Navigator's Kalendar, or Nautical Almanack, for 1783. Andrew Ellicott of Ellicott's Upper Mills, Maryland, authored a series of almanacs, The United States Almanack, the earliest known copy of which bears the date of 1782. Benjamin Banneker, a free African American living near Ellicott's Mills, composed a series of almanacs for the years of 1792 to 1797.

=== Contemporary use ===
Many contemporary almanacs, such as Whitaker's Almanack, have expanded their scope and contents beyond that of their historical counterparts. Modern almanacs may include a comprehensive presentation of statistical and descriptive data covering the entire world. Contents also include discussions of topical developments and a summary of recent historical events. Other modern almanacs that saw publication during the 21st century include TIME Almanac with Information Please, World Almanac and Book of Facts, Farmers' Almanac, The Old Farmer's Almanac and The Almanac for Farmers & City Folk. The Inverness Almanac, an almanac/literary journal, was published in West Marin, California, from 2015 to 2016. In 2007, Harrowsmith Country Life Magazine launched a Canadian Almanac, focused on providing information catered to Canada. The nonprofit agrarian organization, the Greenhorns, currently publishes The New Farmer's Almanac as a resource for young farmers. The Other Almanac, first printed in 2022, is an almanac published by OR Books that contains data and material that draws attention to nature and agriculture within cities.

Major topics covered by almanacs (reflected by their tables of contents) include: geography, government, demographics, agriculture, economics and business, health and medicine, religion, mass media, transportation, science and technology, sport, and awards/prizes.

Other examples include The Almanac of American Politics published by Columbia Books & Information Services, The Almanac of British Politics, the Wapsipinicon Almanac, and the Calendari dels Pagesos, a Catalan-language almanac published in Catalonia since 1861.

The GPS Almanac, as part of the data transmitted by each GPS satellite, contains coarse orbit and status information for all satellites in the constellation, an ionospheric model, and information to relate GPS derived time to Coordinated Universal Time (UTC). Hence the GPS almanac provides a similar goal as the ancient Babylonian almanac, to find celestial bodies.

National Geographic Kids annually publishes a series of books titled "Almanac" (e.g. "Almanac 2025"), which typically contain information on animals, science and technology, and the natural world, among other things.

== See also ==
- Annual publication
- Calendaring software
- Encyclopedia
- Gazetteer
- Kalnirnay
- List of almanacs
- Nautical almanac
- Panchangam
- Panjika
- Tonalamatl
- Tung Shing
- William of Saint-Cloud
- Yearbook
