= Kalnirnay =

Almanac published in India

Kalnirnay (Sumangal Press)
- Type: Private company
- Industry: Almanac
- Founded: 1 January 1973
- Founder: Jayantrao Salgaonkar, Jayraj Salgaokar
- Headquarters: Mumbai, Maharashtra, India
- Products: Almanac
- Services: Horoscope, Matchmaking, Career assessment, Kundali Matching
- Revenue: ₹550 million (US$5.7 million)
- Number of employees: 150
- Website: kalnirnay.com

Kalnirnay (lit. 'timely decision') is an almanac published in India. The almanac gives information about the Panchang, auspicious days, festivals, holidays, sunrise and sunset. It has recipes, stories on health and education, monthly Bhavishya and articles on Hindu astrology.

== History ==
Kalnirnay was founded in 1973 by Jayantrao Salgaonkar and Jayraj Salgaonkar. It initially started as a hand-printed almanac for Marathi subscribers. The logo and typography was designed by Kamal Shedge. The first issue was sold to 10,000 subscribers. It gradually grew to become the largest selling publication in the world, with around 19 million copies being sold annually.

Its website was launched in 1996, its desktop e-version was subsequently launched, and it is now available as Android and iOS applications.

== Publication and contents ==
Kalnirnay is published annually, by Sumangal Publishing, as a calendar almanac for all Indian religions. It contains auspicious dates, festivals and celebrations of Hindus, Muslims, Christians, Sikhs, Jains, Buddhists, Parsis and Jews in detail. It also provides useful information about Daily Panchanga, auspicious times for weddings (Muhurat), Daily Sun Rise – Moon Rise Timings, Sankashti Chaturthi Chandroday (Moon rise) Timing, Monthly Astrological Predictions for all Zodiac Signs, etc. It is published in nine languages – English, Marathi, Hindi, Gujarati, Tamil, Telugu, Kannada, Malayalam and Punjabi with Marathi accounting for the bulk of its readers.

In addition to dates and times of religious and cultural relevance, each issue also contains articles on topics such as health, food and beauty.
