= Old Moore's Almanack =

Almanack

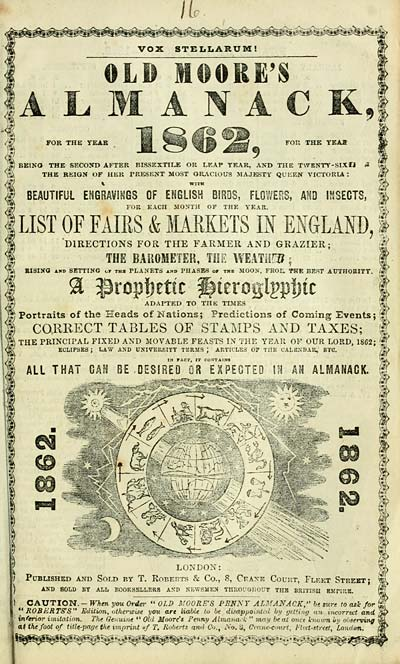
An 1862 issue of Old Moore's Almanack.

Old Moore's Almanack is an astrological almanac which has been published in Britain since 1697.

It was written and published by Francis Moore, a self-taught physician and astrologer who served at the court of Charles II.

The first edition in 1697 contained weather forecasts. In 1700 Moore published Vox Stellarum, The Voice of the Stars, containing astrological observations; this was also known as Old Moore's Almanack. It was a bestseller throughout the 18th and 19th centuries, selling as many as 107,000 copies in 1768.

Names attributed to the post Moore era of the almanack include Tycho Wing and Henry Andrews.

The almanac is still published annually by W. Foulsham & Company Limited, giving predictions of world and sporting events, as well as more conventional data such as tide tables. It claims to have predicted the September 11 attacks.
