= Paxton, Massachusetts =

- Town
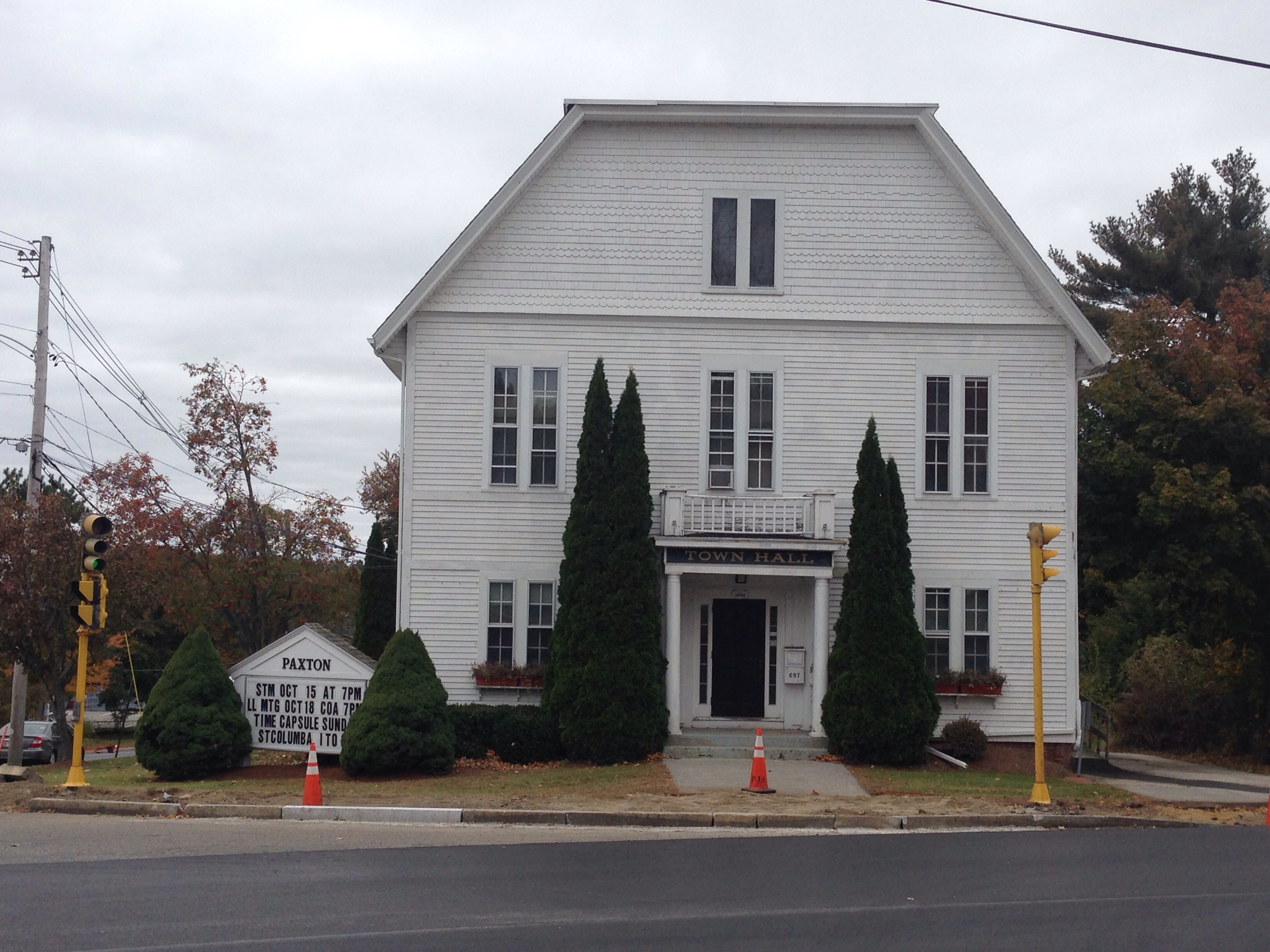
- Paxton Town Hall

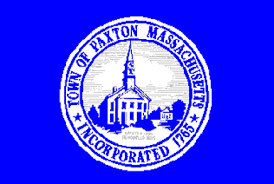
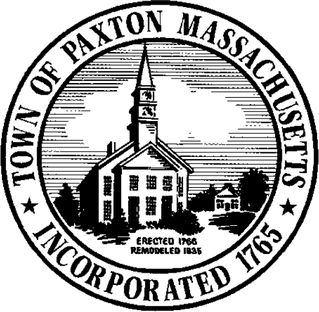
- Flag Seal

- Location in Worcester County and the state of Massachusetts.
- Coordinates: 42°18′40″N 71°55′43″W
- Country: United States
- State: Massachusetts
- County: Worcester
- Settled: 1749
- Incorporated: 1765

Government
  - Type: Open town meeting
  - Town Administrator: Robert Birkbeck
  - Selectboard: Peter Bogren, Jr. (Chair); Julia N. Pingitore (Vice Chair); Kirk R. Huehls (Clerk); Carol L. Riches; Christoper M. Curtis

Area
  - Total: 15.5 sq mi (40.1 km^{2})
  - Land: 14.7 sq mi (38.2 km^{2})
  - Water: 0.73 sq mi (1.9 km^{2})
- Elevation: 1,158 ft (353 m)

Population (2020)
  - Total: 5,004
  - Density: 339/sq mi (131/km^{2})
- Time zone: UTC-5 (Eastern)
  - Summer (DST): UTC-4 (Eastern)
- ZIP Code: 01612
- Area code: 508 / 774
- FIPS code: 25-52420
- GNIS feature ID: 0619485
- Website: www.paxtonma.gov

Paxton is a town in Worcester County, Massachusetts, United States. The population was 5,004 at the 2020 census.

== History ==
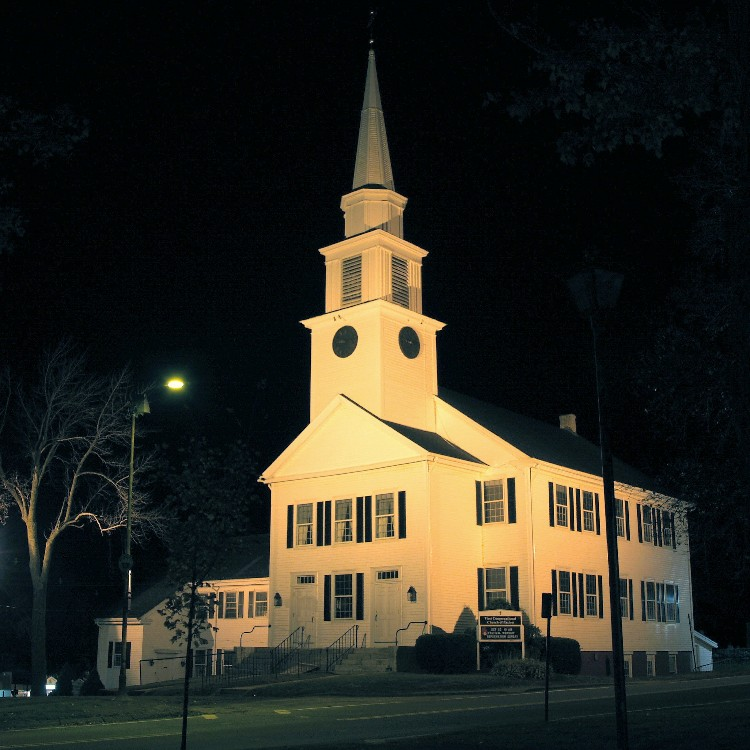
Paxton center church at night

Paxton was first settled by Europeans in 1749 and was officially incorporated in 1765. It was previously occupied by the Nipmuc tribe.

The district of Paxton was originally taken from the towns of Leicester and Rutland, in nearly equal parts, and was incorporated February 12, 1765. Charles Paxton, marshal of the Admiralty Court, offered a church bell to the town if it was named after him; no such gift was ever made. The inhabitants soon commenced their plan for building a meeting house, and on the first day of April 1765, the town voted to build it. It was raised on June 18, 1766, and this is the frame of the present meeting house.

In 1766, within two years of the incorporation of the town, the foundation of the present meeting house was laid, on what is now the common, near the flagstaff. The land was given by Seth Howe, from a piece of his pasture.

David Davis went to Boston with a pair of oxen and drew to Paxton the bell now in use, which was made by Paul Revere.

A small historic and now defunct amusement park called "Paxton Navy Yard" operated here in the mid 20th century.

Asnebumskit Hill was the site of the Yankee Network's early FM broadcasting antenna, beginning its commercial operations in Summer 1939.

== Geography ==
According to the United States Census Bureau, the town has a total area of 15.5 square miles (40 km^{2}), of which 14.7 square miles (38 km^{2}) is land and 0.7 square miles (1.8 km^{2}), or 4.78%, is water.

== Demographics ==
Historical population
Year	Pop.	±%
1790	558	—
1850	820	+47.0%
1860	725	−11.6%
1870	646	−10.9%
1880	592	−8.4%
1890	445	−24.8%
1900	459	+3.1%
1910	416	−9.4%
1920	489	+17.5%
1930	672	+37.4%
1940	791	+17.7%
1950	1,066	+34.8%
1960	2,399	+125.0%
1970	3,731	+55.5%
1980	3,762	+0.8%
1990	4,047	+7.6%
2000	4,386	+8.4%
2010	4,806	+9.6%
2020	5,004	+4.1%
2022*	5,024	+0.4%
* = population estimate. Source: United States census records and Population Estimates Program data.

As of the census of 2000, there were 4,386 people, 1,428 households, and 1,153 families residing in the town. The population density was 297.7 inhabitants per square mile (114.9/km^{2}). There were 1,461 housing units at an average density of 99.2 per square mile (38.3/km^{2}). The racial makeup of the town was 96.69% White, 0.68% African American, 0.09% Native American, 1.07% Asian, 0.57% from other races, and 0.89% from two or more races. Hispanic or Latino of any race were 1.55% of the population.

There were 1,428 households, out of which 36.1% had children under the age of 18 living with them, 72.1% were married couples living together, 6.0% had a female householder with no husband present, and 19.2% were non-families. 15.7% of all households were made up of individuals, and 8.3% had someone living alone who was 65 years of age or older. The average household size was 2.79 and the average family size was 3.13.

In the town, the population was spread out, with 23.9% under the age of 18, 13.6% from 18 to 24, 23.9% from 25 to 44, 24.0% from 45 to 64, and 14.6% who were 65 years of age or older. The median age was 38 years. For every 100 females, there were 91.5 males. For every 100 females age 18 and over, there were 87.0 males.

The median income for a household in the town was $72,039, and the median income for a family was $80,498. Males had a median income of $51,694 versus $38,409 for females. The per capita income for the town was $29,573. None of the families and 1.8% of the population were living below the poverty line, including no under eighteens and 4.5% of those over 64.

State government
State Representative(s):	Kimberly N. Ferguson (R)
State Senator(s):	Anne Gobi (D)
Governor's Councilor(s):	Jen Caissie (R)
Federal government
U.S. Representative(s):	James P. McGovern (D-2nd District)
U.S. Senators:	Elizabeth Warren (D), Ed Markey (D)

== Arts and culture ==
=== Points of interest ===
- Moore State Park
- Worcester County Memorial Park
- Thompson Pond (Massachusetts)

== Education ==
- Anna Maria College was a private Catholic college located in Paxton, ceased operations at the end of the spring 2026 semester.
- Paxton is a member of the Wachusett Regional School District.
- Paxton Center School is the town's kindergarten, elementary and middle school (K–8).
- The public high school is Wachusett Regional High School, in Holden, Massachusetts.
- As of 2005, high school students may choose to attend Bay Path Regional Vocational Technical High School.
- Paxton Center School offers band, chorus and track to students in grades 5–8. All students participate in physical education, art education and technology classes.

=== Library ===
The Paxton public library began in 1877. In fiscal year 2008, the town of Paxton spent 1.53% ($143,354) of its budget on its public library—approximately $30 per person ($36.74 adjusted for inflation to 2021).

== Infrastructure ==
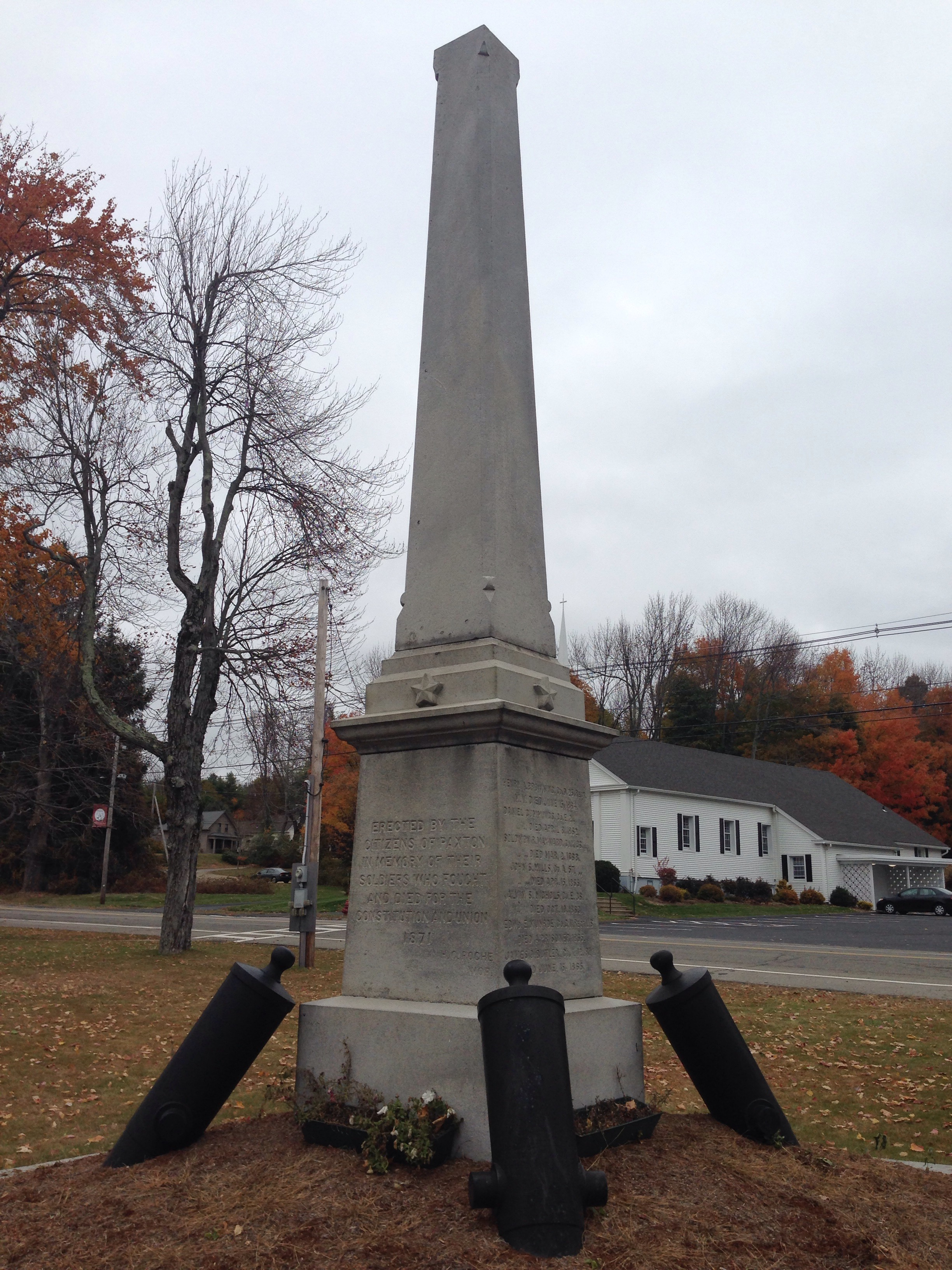
Paxton civil war memorial

=== Utilities ===
- Electric service is provided by the town's own municipal light department.
- Water service is provided by the town's own water department. Paxton's principal source of drinking water is Asnebumskit Pond. Recently, Paxton sells the raw Asnebumskit Pond water to Worcester, and buys back water treated at Worcester's filtration plant.
- Telephone service is provided by Verizon. All phones in Paxton are connected to Verizon's main central office in Worcester.
- Cable television service is provided by Charter Communications.
- No natural gas or sewer service is available in Paxton. At least one house on the Paxton-Worcester city line is connected to the Worcester sewer system. Paxton residents voted down the creation of the South Paxton Sewer District at a February 28, 2006, town meeting. This district would have installed sewers in the part of Paxton adjacent to Worcester.

== Notable people ==
- Ledyard Bill (1836–1907), politician, book publisher, and historical writer
- Jamie Dinan (born 1959), investor
- David Goodman (born 1846), U.S. Army Medal of Honor recipient
- Burt Grinstead (born 1988), actor
- Stephen Knott (born 1957), historian, professor, and author
- Todd Richards, snowboarder
- Samuel Stearns, astronomer
- Harriet Ware, teacher

== See also ==
- List of places in the United States named after people
