= Samuel Stearns =

American physician

Samuel Stearns (1741–1810) was an American astronomer, medical doctor, writer and publisher.

== Career ==
Stearns was born 13 July 1741 at Bolton, Massachusetts. He lived at Paxton, Massachusetts, from 1771 until 1784, from there issuing his annual The North-American’s almanack. He moved to Brattleboro, Vermont, where his regular almanac became The Universal Calendar: and Northamerican Almanack. He also published the first ever nautical almanack (1792) to be printed in America.

His trade was medicine but he also studied herbalism and astronomy. The book Annals of Brattleboro, 1681-1895 states of him that: "His fame as an astronomer led many of the inhabitants to consult him on the turn of future events." His sister married William Herschel, the astronomer.

== American Revolutionary war ==
Stearns was a British Loyalist during and after the American Revolutionary War, which caused him to be falsely accused of several crimes and falsely imprisoned. He was forced at various times to flee to the British, first in Long Island, New York (1780–83), later to Britain itself. In 1790 he took a degree from the University of Aberdeen in Scotland, and travelled in Europe.

== Death ==
He returned to America and died at Brattleboro on 8 August 1810. He was buried at Prospect Hill Cemetery in Brattleboro. The Stearns papers are held at 2013 as: "Stearns, Samuel, Papers, 1784-1810; 1904-1935", as part of the American Antiquarian Society's Manuscript Collections.

== Bibliography ==
- The American Herbal or Materia Medica (1801) (Part of his larger North American Dispensatory, a uniform textbook for medical treatment).
- The American Oracle (1791) (his collected contributions to The Philadelphia Magazine of which he was the editor for a short time, on recent discoveries in the arts and sciences).
- The mystery of animal magnetism revealed (1791, a debunking account).
- Dr. Stearns's Tour from London to Paris (1790).
- A Tour in Holland, by an American (1790).
