= Raphael's Ephemeris =

Table used to determine positions of planets

Raphael's Ephemeris is an ephemeris, or set of tables, used in astrology to determine the position of the Sun, Moon and planets. Raphael was a pseudonym used by the original author of the ephemeris, Robert Cross Smith.

== History ==
An ephemeris is a table of the calculated positions of astronomical objects and various other data, usually for a specific time of the day, either noon or midnight. A uniform time measurement is needed to establish accuracy, and ephemerides will use variously Greenwich Mean Time, Universal Time or Ephemeris Time. Historically, the ephemeris was used for astrology and dates back to ancient Babylon. However, ephemerides became highly useful to navigators and astronomers, and were officially recognised by governments from about the early modern period. The first national astronomical ephemeris, Connaissance de Temps, was published in France in 1679. In 1767 came the Nautical Almanac and Astronomical Ephemeris, which is issued annually by the Royal Observatory at Greenwich.

== Publishing history ==
Raphael's Ephemeris was first issued as part of an almanac entitled The Prophetic Messenger in the early nineteenth century. 'Raphael', the name given to one of three archangels in the Old Testament, was used as a pseudonym by Robert Cross Smith (1795–1832), a former carpenter who had developed an interest in astrology. Smith first used the pseudonym in 1824 when he edited a periodical called The Straggling Astrologer, later re-published as The Astrologer of the Nineteenth Century. He also referred to himself as the ‘Royal Merlin’.

The Straggling Astrologer was a relative failure, but by 1827 Smith had assumed editorship of The Prophetic Messenger, which was read widely by astrologers of the day, and contributed to a renaissance of interest in astrology in the nineteenth century.

Raphael's Ephemeris was issued as a separate publication after Smith’s death, whilst others adopted and continued with the name 'Raphael'. The "second Raphael" was John Palmer (1807–1837), a former student of Smith's, who edited Raphael's Sanctuary of the Astral Art in 1834; the third was a Mr. Medhurst, the editor of the Prophetic Messenger between c. 1837–1847. Smith is sometimes confused with ‘Edwin Raphael’, who in fact was the pseudonym for the succeeding Raphael, (number four) a certain Mr. Wakeley (d. 1852). Number five was a Mr. Sparkes (1820–1875), editor of the Prophetic Messenger from 1852 to 1872, who even briefly edited Raphael's Ephemeris’ main rival at the time, Zadkiel's Almanac. ('Zadkiel' was the pseudonym of Richard James Morrison, an astrologer/inventor whose almanac dates back to 1831.) Robert Thomas Cross (1850–1923) became the next Raphael, obtaining the copyright to the publication at some time in the 1870s.

Robert Cross Smith was also responsible for popularising the system of astrological house division known as the Placidean, after the Italian monk Placidus de Titus (d. 1668). Placidus house tables, for locations in northern latitudes, are still listed in Raphael's Ephemeris, nowadays issued by W. Foulsham, a British publisher founded in 1819. (They first published Raphael's in 1836.)

The latest ephemerides have been calculated using data obtained from the astronomical ephemerides produced by NASA’s Jet Propulsion Laboratory in Pasadena, California.
