= Jayant Salgaonkar =

Indian jyotishi (astrologer), businessman, historian, scholar and writer

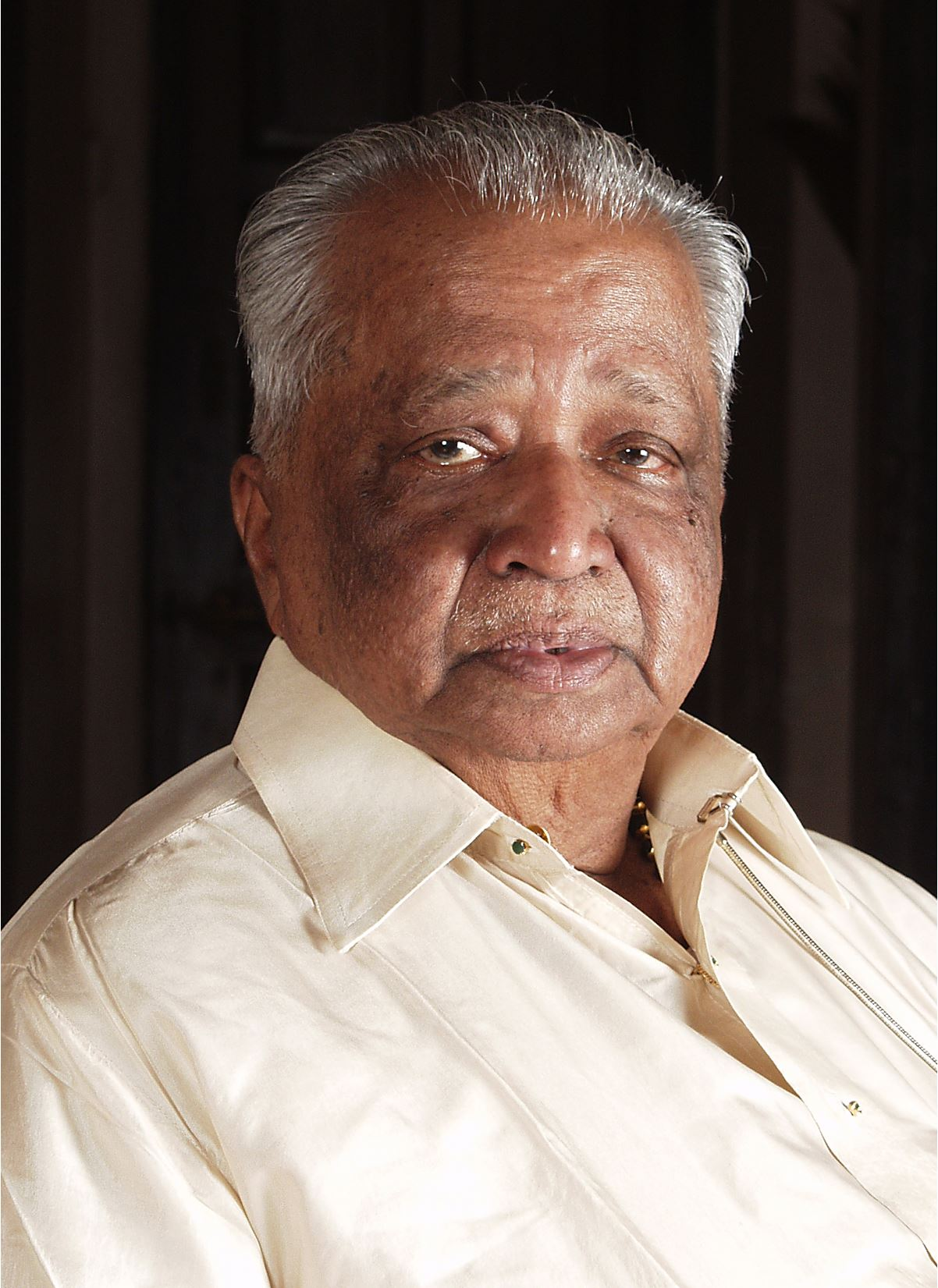
- Founder of Kalnirnay
- Born: 1 February 1929; Malvan, Sindhudurg, Maharashtra, India
- Died: 20 August 2013 (aged 84)
- Parent: Shivram Salgaonkar

Jayant Salgaonkar (1 February 1929 – 20 August 2013) was an Indian jyotishi (astrologer), businessman, historian, scholar, and writer. He was the founder of Kalnirnay.

== Early life ==
He wrote Kalnirnay in 1973, selling over 10 million copies in nine languages. Kalnirnay is a yearly almanac of all religions containing details of auspicious dates, festivals and celebrations of Farsi, Jews, Muslims, Christians, Hindu and others. He created a combination of jyotish, information and dharmashstra. He was the pioneer of the daily Rashi Bhavishya and the daily crossword in the Marathi newspaper.

== Books ==
- Sundarmath - ‘सुंदरमठ’ (समर्थ रामदासस्वामींच्या जीवनावरील कादंबरी )
- Deva tuchi Ganeshu - ‘देवा तूचि गणेशु’(श्रीगणेश दैवताचा इतिहास आणि स्वरुप, तसेच समाजजीवनावरील त्याचा प्रभाव याचा अभ्यासपूर्ण आढावा.)
- Dharma-Shatriy Nirnay -‘धर्म-शास्त्रीय निर्णय’ या ग्रंथाचे संपादन व लेखन
- Kalnirnay- ‘कालनिर्णय’ या मराठी, इंग्रजी, गुजराथी, हिंदी, कानडी, तामिळ, बंगाली, तेलगू, मल्याळम भाषेतून निघणार्‍या वार्षिक नियतकालिकाचे संस्थापक-संपादक.
- Panchang - ‘पंचाग’ या क्षेत्रात सुलभता आणि शास्त्रशुद्धता आणण्याचे यशस्वी प्रयत्न. पंचांगाचा परंपरागत साचा बदलून नवीन स्वरुपात संपादन.
- Devachiye Dwari - ‘देवाचिये द्वारी’ (धार्मिक, पारमार्थिक अशा स्वरुपाचे लिखाण संत वाड्:मयाच्या आधाराने १९२५ मध्ये ३०९ लेखांचा संग्रह) पुढे त्याचे अनेक खंड
- Ganadhish jo Ish - ‘गणाधीश जो ईश’(श्रीगणेशावरील लेख व मुलाखती वृत्तपत्रांतून प्रसिध्द झालेल्या लेखांचा संग्रह)
- Rastyvarache Dive - ‘रस्त्यावरचे दिवे’ (आयुष्यात घडलेल्या, अनुभवाला आलेल्या, तसेच कुणाकडून तरी समजलेल्या प्रत्यक्ष घटनांवर आधारित लेखांचा संग्रह)

== Personal life ==
He and his wife had three sons and grandchildren.

Jyotirbhaskar Jayant Salgaonkar died in the Hinduja hospital in Mumbai after a brief illness.

== Awards and recognition ==
- Jyotirbhasakr by Sakeshwar Vidhyapeeth
- Jyotishalankar by Mumbai Jyotirvidyalay
- Jyotimartand in Pune Jyotish Sammelan
- D.Lt. by Maharashtra Jyotish Vidyapeeth
- Vaidik Puraskar at Nasik by Shivparvati Pratishthan
- Lifetime Achievement award by Konkan Marathi Sahitya Parishad
- Samarth Sant Seva Puraskar by Samarath Seva Mandal, Sajjangad
