= Robert Cross Smith =

British astrologer

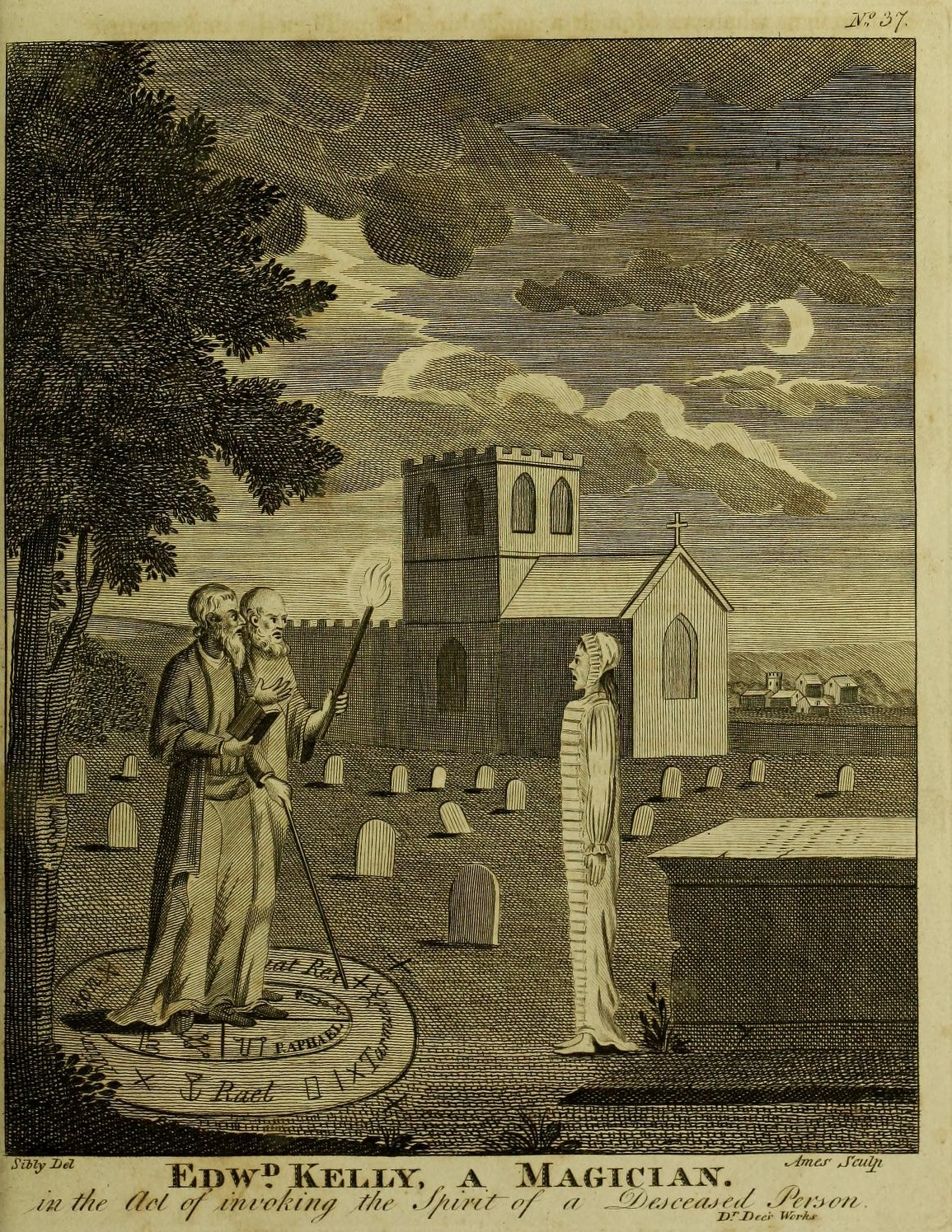
Illustration from The Astrologer Of The Nineteenth Century (1825). The image is based on an 1806 illustration by Ebenezer Sibly showing Edward Kelly and John Dee.

Robert Cross Smith (1795-1832) was an English astrologer, writing under the pseudonym of "Raphael".

Smith was born in Bristol on March 19, 1795. He married in 1820 and moved to London, where he became interested in astrology. Together with G. W. Graham, he published a book on geomancy in 1822.

Smith began to edit a periodical entitled The Straggling Astrologer in 1824, but failed to receive enough subscribers and the periodical had to be discontinued after a few issues. He collected the issues of the failed periodical in a volume entitled The Astrologer Of The Nineteenth Century in the same year. The volume claimed to be the "sixth edition", but it is believed that editions one to five never existed. A substantially enlarged edition appeared in 1825 as the "seventh edition", with additional material attributed to "Merlinus Anglicus Junior" (Merlinus Anglicus Junior: The English Merlin Revived was the title of a 1644 book by William Lilly). It was printed by Knight & Lacey of London.

From 1827 until his death in 1832, he edited an astrological almanac, entitled The Prophetic Messenger. Also published by Smith was The Familiar Astrologer and A Manual of Astrology, both in 1828.

Smith died on 26 February 1832 in London. His almanac continued to be edited as Raphael’s Ephemeris and would become a standard work in British and US American astrology. Raphael's Ephemeris popularized the system of Placidian system of astrological houses in the English-speaking world and in modern western astrology in general.

A collection of articles on magic and divination from Smith's publications has been collected in "A Sorcerous Anthology, Magick and Occult Writings from the Publications of Robert Cross Smith", available from Topaz House Publications.
