= Europa World Year Book =

Reference resource published in the UK

- 1976 edition
- Language: English
- Published: 1926
- Publication place: United Kingdom
- Media type: Almanac
- ISBN: 978-1857437140 (2014)
- Website: europaworld.com

The Europa World Year Book provides detailed country surveys containing analytical, statistical and directory data available for over 250 countries and territories.

Volume I contains a listing of more than 2,000 international organizations such as the United Nations and its agencies, the European Union, the International Criminal Court and the Organization of the Petroleum Exporting Countries, and provides coverage of countries arranged alphabetically from Afghanistan to Equatorial Guinea.

Volume II covers countries from Eritrea to Nicaragua.

Volume III covers countries from Niger to Zimbabwe and includes an index of territories.

Each country is covered by an individual chapter containing:

- A unique introductory survey covering contemporary political history; economic affairs; constitution and government; regional and international co-operation; and public holidays
- A statistical survey using the latest available figures on demographics; labour force; health and welfare; agriculture; forestry; fishing; mining; industry; currency and exchange rates; government finance; international reserves and the monetary sector; cost of living; national accounts; balance of payments; external trade; railways; roads; shipping; civil aviation; tourism; media and telecommunications; and education
- A directory section listing names, addresses, telephone and fax numbers, e-mail and internet addresses, plus other useful facts about organizations from the fields of government; election commissions; political organizations; diplomatic representation; judicial system; religions; the press; publishers; broadcasting and communications; banking; insurance; trade and industry; development organizations; chambers of commerce; industrial and trade associations; utilities; trade unions; transport; tourism; defence; and education.

== Related regional publications ==
All is also available in nine regional surveys:

- Africa South of the Sahara;
- Central and South-Eastern Europe;
- Eastern Europe, Russia and Central Asia;
- The Far East and Australasia;
- The Middle East and North Africa;
- South America, Central America and the Caribbean;
- South Asia;
- The USA and Canada;
- Western Europe.

== See also ==
Almanacs issued by other publishers:

- The World Almanac and Book of Facts
- The CIA World Factbook
- Whitaker's Almanack
- The New York Times Almanac
- Der Fischer Weltalmanach
- Time Almanac with Information Please
