= Brunching.com =

Humor website

brunching.com
- Website type: Humor site
- Founded: 1997
- Dissolved: June 2003
- Owner: Lore Sjöberg
- Creators: Lore Sjöberg and Dave Neilsen
- Website: brunching.com (archived)
- Commercial: No
- Launched: June 1997
- Current status: Defunct

Brunching.com was a humor web site that existed from 1997 to June 2003. It was run by the titular Brunching Shuttlecocks, which mainly consisted of Lore Sjöberg and Dave Neilsen.

In an interview, Lore stated that the website was created because he was tired of hearing his friends talk about their 401K plans when he didn't have one, and suggested they talk about creating a comedy website instead. Only Dave Neilsen, he had previously attempted to form a comedy troupe with during high school and college, could make the time commitment to do so.

During its lifespan, the website was covered by PCMag, Newsweek, Entertainment Weekly, and The Guardian. It received the "Cool Humor Site" award during The TIME Almanac 1999 Cool Site of the Year.

== Content ==
Recurring features were:

- The Ratings: Sjöberg would choose a random topic (Crayola colors or celestial objects) and would then apply letter grades to items from that category with an explanatory paragraph.
- The Self-Made Critic: Movie reviews by the anonymous Self-Made Critic (later revealed as Neilsen). Films were graded on a scale of 0 to 5 Babylons, and each featured a (usually belittling) comment from the anonymous Editor as a post-script.
- This or That: Tests of the reader's ability to differentiate dissimilar things with similar names, such as "Christian Metal Band or Star Trek: The Next Generation Episode?", "Beanie Baby or G.I. Joe?", and "Porn Star or My Little Pony?"
- Lore Brand Comics: Three-panel comic strips by Sjöberg, usually consisting of a short monologue by his cartoon avatar.
- The Complete and Utter Idiot's Guide: Instructions were provided to "the complete and utter idiot" on how to perform simple tasks, such as cooking a TV dinner, in the most literal and painstakingly detailed manner possible.
- Ed's World:Short stories on how Ed, the only smart man in the world, outwitted the imbecile citizens of Earth.
- Good or Bad?: A list of dissimilar items in a cgi web form that allowed readers to rate them as good or bad. Votes were tabulated, and items appeared above or below the "Line of Truth" based on whether more readers voted "good" or "bad".
- Web toys, such as an Alanis Morissette lyric generator; and CYBORG, which found what one's name stood for if it was an acronym.

The Geek Hierarchy was their most circulated jokes, and was widely passed around. It is a chart of various groups in fandom, with arrows between groups indicating who looks down on whom. The topmost group is "Published Science Fiction Authors" and various flavors of furries are at the bottom.
