= David Whitaker (publisher) =

British book publisher (died 2021)

David Haddon Whitaker OBE (died 4 August 2021) was a British book publisher. A direct descendant of Joseph Whitaker, he joined the family firm, J. Whitaker & Sons, in 1956. Whitaker became involved with the development of Standard Book Numbers, the precursor to the ISBN, in the 1960s. Whitaker's firm was well placed to drive the standard as it published records of all books published in the United Kingdom. The SBN was expanded internationally from 1968 and Whitaker, who is sometimes known as "the father of the ISBN", played a key role in this. He chaired the first International Organization for Standardization (ISO) working group on the ISBN and helped draft ISO standard 2108.

Whitaker served as editor of trade magazine The Bookseller from 1977 to 1979. In this role he favoured stories on women in the industry, to encourage them in what was a male-dominated workplace. Whitaker afterwards became managing director, and then chairman, of J. Whitaker & Sons. He improved the firm's coverage of book sale figures to meet a market need and developed the TeleOrdering system that was used widely for book ordering in pre-Internet times. Whitaker was appointed an Officer of the Order of the British Empire in the 1991 Birthday Honours. He supported campaigns against the introduction of value-added tax on books and in support of the Public Lending Right and also founded trade organisations.

== Early career ==
David Haddon Whitaker joined J. Whitaker & Sons, a publisher known for producing The Bookseller and Whitaker's Almanack and for their lists of upcoming books to be published in the United Kingdom. The firm was the main supplier of business information and bibliographical data to the British book industry. When Whitaker joined the company his father, Haddon Whitaker, was then in charge of it. David Whitaker was a direct descendant of the firm's founder, Joseph Whitaker, and the fourth generation of Whitakers to be involved in the company.

== Role in popularisation of the ISBN ==
An ISBN and its corresponding barcode

Whitaker is sometimes called "the father of the ISBN" (International Standard Book Numbers) for his role in developing and popularising the system of assigning identification numbers to books. Before the introduction of identification numbers it was difficult to track individual editions of books. Whitaker recalled "we were trying to solve problems related to the transmission of a book order. Say, for example, that you were looking for a particular edition of Black Beauty. Previously, you had to go through 125 alpha-numeric characters before you could identify the unique edition that you wanted".

The catalyst for the development of Standard Book Numbers (SBNs) was the establishment of a computerised warehouse facility by major bookseller WHSmith. Professor Gordon Foster of the London School of Economics was commissioned to devise a book numbering system, which became the SBN. Whitaker proposed that his firm embed the number in their book lists to make the SBN "as much a part of the book as the name of the author and title". The SBN was introduced in 1967, with J. Whitaker & Sons becoming the first SBN agency in the world responsible for issuing the numbers. Whitaker said that his firm was the only one that could have introduced standard book numbering as it published records of all books in the UK and was willing to publish lists of those coming out in the next six months.

Whitaker noted there was some resistance to the system, including from Macmillan Publishers, a major producer of educational textbooks. This was overcome after Whitaker, the Publishers Association, and the Greater London Council—Macmillan's biggest customer—wrote to them to urge it be adopted. Whitaker also produced, with colleague James Coates, a 12-page manual on the SBN system that was sent, free of charge, to every British publisher. All British books had received an SBN by the end of 1967.

The system became international in 1968 when it was first implemented in the US and spread to other countries. It was decided to register the system with the International Organization for Standardization (ISO) and Whitaker served as chair of the first ISO working group on the ISBN. Whitaker helped to draft the standard for the system (ISO 2108) at meetings in Berlin. He claimed that its adoption, coming in 1972—within a year of work starting—was the shortest for any ISO standard. Whitaker played a key role in persuading other nations to adopt the ISBN and the International ISBN Agency (IIA) regards him as "crucial to ISBN's success and ubiquity across the world's book supply chain". Whitaker served for many years as chair of the IIA's annual meetings, navigating the agency through political disputes at a time of huge expansion of national ISBN agencies. The introduction of the ISBN had a large effect on the industry, enabling the barcoding of books, electronic ordering and more efficient compilation of sales data.

== Later life ==
Whitaker was editor of The Bookseller from 1977 to 1979. He was noted for adopting a policy of encouraging women in the trade, which was then dominated by white men, through the stories it covered. He also successfully defended a libel claim made by media baron Robert Maxwell and won his legal costs. Whitaker said his three years as editor at The Bookseller were "the best and happiest years of my working life. The only day I was sad was the day I was promoted out".

Whitaker later became managing director, and then chairman, of J. Whitaker & Sons. At the firm he improved the coverage of book sale figures, in line with a desire by the industry for detail on how many books were sold to the public. Previously firms only knew how many they had sold to booksellers and, with no idea how well they sold in shops, were often shocked to receive quantities of unsold books as returns. Whitaker also developed the TeleOrdering system used widely by booksellers for ordering products in the 1980s and 1990s, prior to the widespread introduction of internet ordering. Whitaker was appointed an Officer of the Order of the British Empire in the 1991 Birthday Honours. Whitaker retired from the family firm in 1997, following a disagreement, he was succeeded as chairman by his son, Martin. The firm was sold to the Dutch company Verenigde Nederlandse Uitgeverijen in 1999.

Outside of the firm Whitaker campaigned against a proposed introduction of value-added tax on books and in support of the Public Lending Right. He also helped to create the trade standards body Editeur and the supply chain organisation the Book Industry Communication. Whitaker also assisted The Book Society and Books in Print organisations.

Whitaker was married to Maggie van Reenen. He died in his sleep on 4 August 2021. His funeral was held on 17 September 2021 at St Paul's, Covent Garden, where his parents were married. A wake was held afterwards at the Garrick Club.
