= Der Fischer Weltalmanach =

German almanac

Der Fischer Weltalmanach was an almanac, a popular publication of the information issued in Frankfurt on Main, Germany, created at the end of each year since 1959 by a team of Fischer Taschenbuch Verlag. In September 2018, the 60th and last edition was published. Due to reduced demand, and the Internet having cheaper options, no further editions are produced.

== Concept ==
The idea that inspired the creators of the almanac was to find a new form of rapid transmission of information. Inspired by the U.S. The World Almanac and Book of Facts, Gottfried Bermann Fischer, publisher, and Gustav Fochler-Hauke, editor, developed a product that became a bestseller in the German market, reaching, in the first edition print run, about 100 thousand copies, although it is distributed in only 89 then-existing sovereign states. Each year had more pages - 385 pages (1960), 480 (1980), 704 (2000). And each year the price went up - DM 3.30 (1960), DM 9.80 (1980), DM 24.90 (2000), €29.95 (2009).

== Contents ==
Over 50% of the content is devoted to the 195 countries of the world, including facts, figures, and other basic information (language, GDP, the currency structure of the country, society, state, government, political parties and the economy), and a chronicle of the events of the previous year. Facts about Germany, Austria and Switzerland are richer. There is also a chronicle of events and many statistics for each federal country (land) or canton.

The publication contains a chronicle of events of the past year, discussed the major themes of the world, including economic and financial crisis, sea piracy, armed conflicts. Added information about the European Union and several international organizations. Discusses the most important problems in economics, environment, culture and sport. It also includes biographies of famous personalities and information about the deceased.

Edition 2010, anniversary, contains more than 250,000, updated data, more than 900 maps, illustrations and tables. It discusses fifty almanac edition, important events in the development of the world, and significant figures in the period 1960 to 2009.

== See also ==
- The World Almanac and Book of Facts
- The CIA World Factbook
- Whitaker's Almanack
- The New York Times Almanac
- Time Almanac with Information Please
