= Ten Men =

2005 novel by Alexandra Gray

- First edition cover
- Author: Alexandra Gray
- Language: English
- Genre: Romance
- Publisher: Atlantic Books
- Publication date: 13 January 2005
- Publication place: United Kingdom
- Media type: Print (Hardback & Paperback)
- Pages: 304 p. (paperback edition)
- ISBN: 1-84354-256-0 (paperback edition)
- OCLC: 190775518

Ten Men is a novel by Alexandra Gray that was first published in 2005. Episodic in character, it covers a period of 20 years in the life of the first person narrator, an attractive nameless Englishwoman in search of perfect happiness, a state she equates with life with a perfect partner. Ten Men is a serious treatment of the common "chick lit" motif of "waiting for Mr Right". In her late thirties and childless at the end of the novel, the heroine has had relationships with a succession of men but has not been able to achieve the happiness and peace of mind she has been longing for all her adult life.

== Plot introduction ==
Ten Men is a picaresque novel in that the heroine is constantly "moving on", time and again leaving behind the people she has been intimate with and associating with a new set in some other part of the world. The novel asks the basic question of how many men a woman "needs" until she has found the right partner and thus fulfilment in life—a question which, although frequently discussed in the wake of the sexual revolution, has turned out to be largely unanswerable.

== Plot summary ==
The protagonist is born in the mid-1960s. After her father's premature death when she is seven, she and her sister are brought up in England by their mother, who is a French Catholic. Conditioned to believe that pre-marital sex is a sin, at 18 the heroine is forced into an early marriage with a teacher, who works literally day and night at a remote boarding school for boys. Stripped of her privacy and her youthful ways, she clings to her husband, hoping he will take a job elsewhere. When he does not she deserts him and embarks on a series of affairs with wealthy men who are not interested in a long-term relationship with her: a lawyer, a capitalist ("the Billionaire"), a Lord.

Similar to Caroline Meeber in Dreiser's Sister Carrie, the protagonist is not prepared to earn a living through honest work dependent on her qualifications. Accordingly, she always has to rely financially on the men in her life. In particular, it is the billionaire who, as a kind of parting present, volunteers to pay for her very expensive university education at some exclusive New York college as well as for her Upper East Side apartment.

After her graduation the protagonist eventually moves back to London. An affair with a sexually inexperienced man ("the Virgin") leads to her first pregnancy ever and a subsequent miscarriage. Having trained as an actress, she gets a few jobs in TV commercials. When she meets her ex-husband again it is only to find out that he is going to get married again. At the end of the novel, aged about 38 and still indecisive, she meets a single father who might become her future partner.

== Publication ==
Publication in the United Kingdom was announced for January 2005, and in the United States for June 2005. The UK publication had previously been listed as June 2004 by Nielsen BookData.

== Reception ==
=== Critical reception ===
Andrea Griffith of Library Journal did not recommend the book, stating that the characters are "flimsy caricatures" and did not find the plot engaging. Griffith was also unimpressed with the depiction of the nameless main character's epiphany. A brief review in Kirkus Reviews commented that it became too sentimental.

Hillary Frey of Salon compared the book to the then recently ended television series Sex and the City, commenting that both are "a sort of celebration of singlehood". Frey stated that it is an honest look at relationships and modern dating.

Mary McCay of Booklist reviewed the audiobook read by Nicky Talacko. Stating that Talacko has a "talent for exuding boredom", McCay found that the reading suited the personalities of the men very well, and commented that Talacko was able to express the frustration, unhappiness, and despair of the protagonist.

=== Audience reception ===
In July 2005, Ten Men had placed at number four on The Bookseller's Small Publishers Top 20 Fiction for the 26 weeks ending on 2 July.

== Sources ==
- "10 Men". Kirkus Reviews. 19 May 2010 [1 April 2005]. Archived from the original on 2 August 2026.
- "Publications of the Week". The Bookseller. No. 5134. 25 June 2004. Gale A119183362.
- Broadhurst, Sarah (24 September 2004). "Paperbacks: January: as the new year gets under way, Sarah Broadhurst selects the top titles for January". The Bookseller. No. 5147. Gale A123413160.
- Elliot, Giles (23 September 2005). "Eyes on the prize: independent publishers forced their way into the mainstream bestseller lists in the first half of 2005. Those to appear in the bestseller charts include some old favourites and some new names". The Bookseller. No. 5197. Gale A137501835.
- Frey, Hillary (6 June 2005). ""10 Men" by Alexandra Gray". Salon. Archived from the original on 27 May 2012.
- Griffith, Andrea Y. (1 May 2005). "Gray, Alexandra. Ten Men". Library Journal. Vol. 130, no. 8. p. 72. Gale A132418474.
- Hoffert, Barbara (15 February 2005). "Prepub alert". Library Journal. Vol. 130, no. 3. Gale A129460626.
- McCay, Mary (15 November 2007). "Ten Men". Booklist. Vol. 104, no. 6. p. 66. Gale A172012300.
