= The New York Times Almanac =

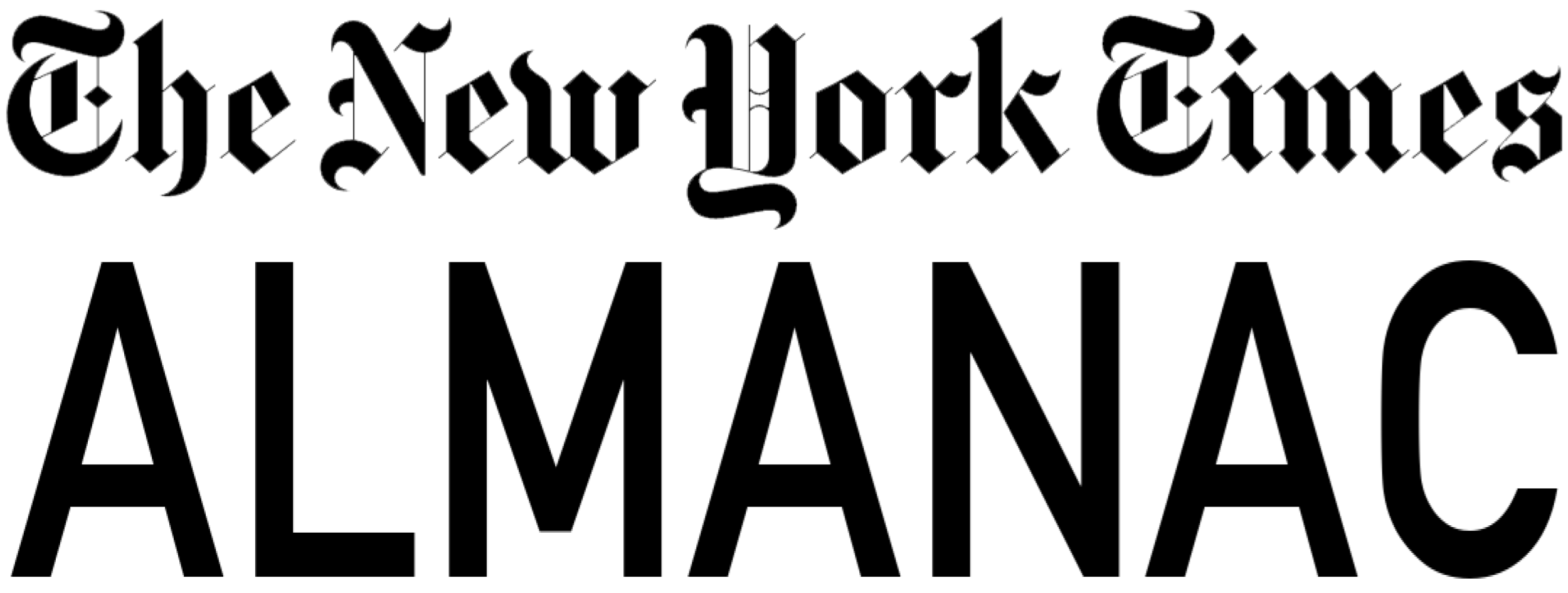

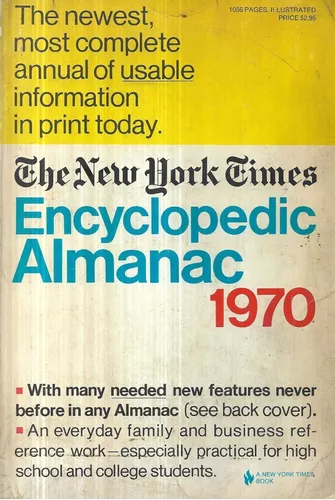
- Cover of The New York Times Encyclopedia Almanac 1970
- Editor: John W. Wright (1998–2011)
- Publisher: The New York Times (1969–1972, 1998–); Associated Press (1973–1975); CBS News (1976–1978); Hammond Almanac, Inc. (1979–1997)
- Founder: The New York Times
- Founded: 1969
- First issue: 1970
- Final issue: 2011
- Company: The New York Times
- Language: English
- Website: Archived at https://web.archive.org/web/20240312174745/https://nytimesalmanac.com/

The New York Times Almanac (NYTA) was an almanac published in the United States.

There were two separate and distinct series of almanacs by this name.

The first was originally published in 1969 by New York Times Books as the 1056 page The New York Times Encyclopedia Almanac 1970. A 16-page supplement with late breaking news was made available to all purchasers in early 1970.

After its third year of publication it was rebranded as The Official Associated Press Almanac 1973 and published by Hammond Almanac, Inc., a Dell Books imprint. Publication continued for ten additional years — as The Official Associated Press Almanac for 1974 and 1975, as The CBS News Almanac for 1976—1978, and finally as The Hammond Almanac for its ultimate five years, 1979–1983.

The second NYTA was the successor to the Universal Almanac. Its publisher, Andrews & McMeel, decided to discontinue that almanac, with the final edition being the 1997 issue. John W. Wright, the editor of the Universal Almanac, owned the rights to its content. He approached The New York Times Company, who agreed with his idea of creating a new almanac with the newspaper's name on it. Penguin was then brought in as the publisher, and the first edition was published in late 1997 as 1998 New York Times Almanac. Wright became the general editor of the NYTA. The 1998 edition of the almanac included a good deal of information from the Universal Almanac, with some members of The Times news staff contributing articles about the major news events of the year, as well as maps in the book. It ceased print publication after the 2011 edition.

== Alternative publications ==
- The World Almanac and Book of Facts
- TIME Almanac with Information Please
- Whitaker's Almanack
- The CIA World Factbook
- Der Fischer Weltalmanach
- Europa World Year Book
