= Second language =

Language spoken in addition to one's first language

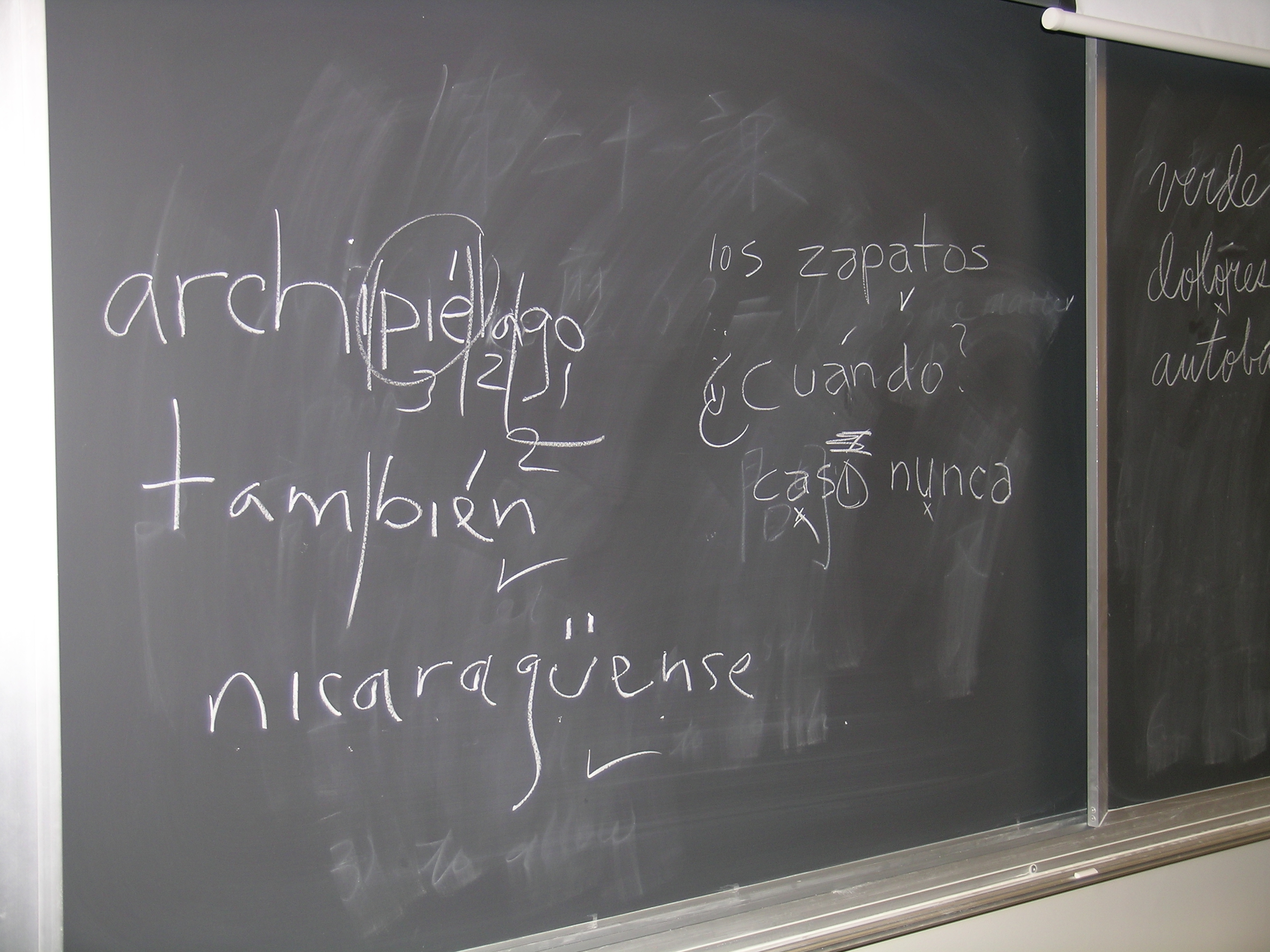
Blackboard used in class at Harvard shows students' efforts at placing the diaeresis and acute accent diacritics used in Spanish orthography.

A second language (L2) is a language spoken in addition to one's first language (L1). A second language may be a neighbouring language, another language of the speaker's home country, or a foreign language.

A speaker's dominant language, which is the language a speaker uses most or is most comfortable with, is not necessarily the speaker's first language. For example, the Canadian census defines first language for its purposes as "What is the language that this person first learned at home in childhood and still understands?", recognizing that for some, the earliest language may be lost, a process known as language attrition. This can happen when young children start school or move to a new language environment.

== Second-language acquisition ==
The distinction between acquiring and learning was made by Stephen Krashen as part of the monitor theory he developed in the 1970s and 1980s. According to Krashen, the acquisition of a language is a natural process; whereas learning a language is a conscious one. In the former, the student needs to partake in natural communicative situations. In the latter, error correction is present, as is the study of grammatical rules isolated from natural language. Not all educators in second language education agree with this distinction; however, the study of how a second language is learned/acquired is referred to as second-language acquisition (SLA).

Research in SLA "...focuses on the developing knowledge and use of a language by children and adults who already know at least one other language... [and] a knowledge of second-language acquisition may help educational policy makers set more realistic goals for programmes for both foreign language courses and the learning of the majority language by minority language children and adults."

SLA has been influenced by both linguistic and psychological theories. One of the dominant linguistic theories hypothesizes that a device or module of sorts in the brain contains innate knowledge. Many psychological theories, on the other hand, hypothesize that cognitive mechanisms, responsible for much of human learning, process language.

Other dominant theories and points of research include 2nd language acquisition studies (which examine if L1 findings can be transferred to L2 learning), verbal behaviour (the view that constructed linguistic stimuli can create a desired speech response), morpheme studies, behaviourism, error analysis, stages and order of acquisition, structuralism (approach that looks at how the basic units of language relate to each other according to their common characteristics), 1st language acquisition studies, contrastive analysis (approach where languages are examined in terms of differences and similarities) and inter-language (which describes the L2 learner's language as a rule-governed, dynamic system).

These theories have all influenced second-language teaching and pedagogy. There are many different methods of second-language teaching, many of which stem directly from a particular theory. Common methods are the grammar-translation method, the direct method, the audio-lingual method (clearly influenced by audio-lingual research and the behaviourist approach), the Silent Way, suggestopedia, community language learning, the total physical response method, and the communicative approach (highly influenced by Krashen's theories). Some of these approaches are more popular than others, and are viewed to be more effective. Most language teachers do not use one singular style, but will use a mix in their teaching. This provides a more balanced approach to teaching and helps students of a variety of learning styles succeed.

=== Effect of age ===
The defining difference between a first language (L1) and a second language (L2) is the age the person learned the language. For example, linguist Eric Lenneberg used second language to mean a language consciously acquired or used by its speaker after puberty. In most cases, people never achieve the same level of fluency and comprehension in their second languages as in their first language. These views are closely associated with the critical period hypothesis.

In acquiring an L2, Hyltenstam found that around the age of six or seven seemed to be a cut-off point for bilinguals to achieve native-like proficiency. After that age, L2 learners could get near-native-like-ness but their language would, while consisting of few actual errors, have enough errors to set them apart from the L1 group. The inability of some subjects to achieve native-like proficiency must be seen in relation to the age of onset (AO). Later, Hyltenstam & Abrahamsson modified their age cut-offs to argue that after childhood, in general, it becomes more and more difficult to acquire native-like-ness, but that there is no cut-off point in particular.

As more knowledge is gained about the brain, there is a hypothesis that when a child is going through puberty, that is the time that accents start. Before a child goes through puberty, the chemical processes in the brain are more geared towards language and social communication. Whereas after puberty, the ability for learning a language without an accent has been rerouted to function in another area of the brain—most likely in the frontal lobe area promoting cognitive functions, or in the neural system of hormone allocated for reproduction and sexual organ growth.

As far as the relationship between age and eventual attainment in SLA is concerned, Krashen, Long, and Scarcella, say that people who encounter foreign language in early age, begin natural exposure to second languages and obtain better proficiency than those who learn the second language as an adult. However, when it comes to the relationship between age and rate SLA, "Adults proceed through early stages of syntactic and morphological development faster than children (where time and exposure are held constant)". Also, "older children acquire faster than younger children do (again, in early stages of morphological and syntactic development where time and exposure are held constant)". In other words, adults and older children are fast learners when it comes to the initial stage of foreign language education.

Gauthier and Genesee have done research which mainly focuses on the second language acquisition of internationally adopted children and results show that early experiences of one language of children can affect their ability to acquire a second language, and usually children learn their second language slower and weaker even during the critical period.

As for the fluency, it is better to do foreign language education at an early age, but being exposed to a foreign language since an early age causes a "weak identification". Such issue leads to a "double sense of national belonging," that makes one not sure of where they belong to because, according to Brian A. Jacob, multicultural education affects students' "relations, attitudes, and behaviors". And as children learn more and more foreign languages, children start to adapt, and get absorbed into the foreign culture that they "undertake to describe themselves in ways that engage with representations others have made". Due to such factors, learning foreign languages at an early age may incur one's perspective of his or her native country.

=== Similarities and differences between learned and native proficiency ===
==== Speed ====
Acquiring a second language can be a lifelong learning process for many. Despite persistent efforts, most learners of a second language will never become fully native-like in it, although with practice considerable fluency can be achieved. However, children by around the age of 5 have more or less mastered their first language with the exception of vocabulary and a few grammatical structures, and the process is relatively very fast because language is a very complex skill. Moreover, if children start to learn a second language when they are seven years old or younger, they will also be fully fluent with their second language in a faster speed comparing to the speed of learning by adults who start to learn a second language later in their life.

==== Correction ====
In the first language, children do not respond to systematic correction. Furthermore, children who have limited input still acquire the first language, which is a significant difference between input and output. Children are exposed to a language environment of errors and lack of correction but they end up having the capacity to figure out the grammatical rules. Error correction does not seem to have a direct influence on learning a second language. Instruction may affect the rate of learning, but the stages remain the same. Adolescents and adults who know the rule are faster than those who do not.

In the learning of a second language the correction of errors remains a controversial topic with many differing schools of thought. Throughout the last century much advancement has been made in research on the correction of students' errors. In the 1950s and 1960s, the viewpoint of the day was that all errors must be corrected at all costs. Little thought went to students' feelings or self-esteem in regards to this constant correction.

In the 1970s, Dulay and Burt's studies showed that learners acquire grammar forms and structures in a pre-determined, inalterable order, and that teaching or correcting styles would not change that.

In 1977, Terrell"s studies showing that there were more factors to be considered in the classroom than the cognitive processing of the students. He contested that the affective side of students and their self-esteem were equally important to the teaching process.

In the 1980s, the strict grammar and corrective approach of the 1950s became obsolete. Researchers asserted that correction was often unnecessary and that instead of furthering students' learning it was hindering them. The main concern at this time was relieving student stress and creating a warm environment for them. Stephen Krashen was a big proponent in this hands-off approach to error correction.

The 1990s brought back the familiar idea that explicit grammar instruction and error correction was indeed useful for the SLA process. At this time, more research started to be undertaken to determine exactly which kinds of corrections are the most useful for students. In 1998, Lyster concluded that "recasts", the teacher repeating a student's incorrect utterance with the correct version, are not always the most useful because students do not notice the correction. His studies in 2002 showed that students learn better when teachers help students recognize and correct their own errors. Mackey, Gas and McDonough had similar findings in 2000 and attributed the success of this method to the student's active participation in the corrective processes.

==== Depth of knowledge ====
According to Noam Chomsky, children will bridge the gap between input and output by their innate grammar because the input (utterances they hear) is so poor but all children end up having complete knowledge of grammar. Chomsky calls it the Poverty of Stimulus. And second language learners can do this by applying the rules they learn to the sentence-construction, for example. So learners in both their native and second language have knowledge that goes beyond what they have received, so that people can make correct utterances (phrases, sentences, questions, etc) that they have never learned or heard before.

==== Emotionality ====
Bilingualism has been an advantage to today's world and being bilingual gives the opportunity to understand and communicate with people with different cultural backgrounds. However, a study done by Optiz and Degner in 2012 shows that sequential bilinguals (i.e. learn their L2 after L1) often relate themselves to the emotions more when they perceive these emotions by their first language/native language/L1, but feel less emotional when by their second language even though they know the meaning of words clearly. The emotional distinction between L1 and L2 indicates that the "effective valence" of words is processed less immediate in L2 because of the delayed vocabulary/lexical access to these two languages.

==== Success ====
Success in language learning can be measured in two ways: likelihood and quality. First language learners will be successful in both measurements. It is inevitable that all people will learn a first language and with few exceptions, they will be fully successful. For second language learners, success is not guaranteed. For one, learners may become fossilized or stuck as it were with ungrammatical items. (Fossilization occurs when language errors become a permanent feature.) The difference between learners may be significant. As noted elsewhere, L2 learners rarely achieve complete native-like control of the second language.

For L2 pronunciation, there are two principles that have been put forth by Levis. The first is nativeness which means the speaker's ability to approximately reach the speaking pattern of the second language of speakers; and the second, understanding, refers to the speaker's ability to make themselves understood.

Being successful in learning a second language is often found to be challenging for some individuals. Research has been done to look into why some students are more successful than others. Stern, Rubin and Reiss are just a few of the researchers who have dedicated time to this subject. They have worked to determine what qualities make a "good language learner". Some of their common findings are that a good language learner uses positive learning strategies, is an active learner who is constantly searching for meaning. Also a good language learner demonstrates a willingness to practice and use the language in real communication. He also monitors himself and his learning, has a strong drive to communicate, and has a good ear and good listening skills.

Özgür and Griffiths have designed an experiment in 2013 about the relationship between different motivations and second language acquisition. They looked at four types of motivations—intrinsic (inner feelings of learner), extrinsic (reward from outside), integrative (attitude towards learning), and instrumental (practical needs). According to the test results, the intrinsic part has been the main motivation for these students who learn English as their second language. However, students report themselves being strongly instrumentally motivated. In conclusion, learning a second language and being successful depend on every individual.

== Foreign language ==
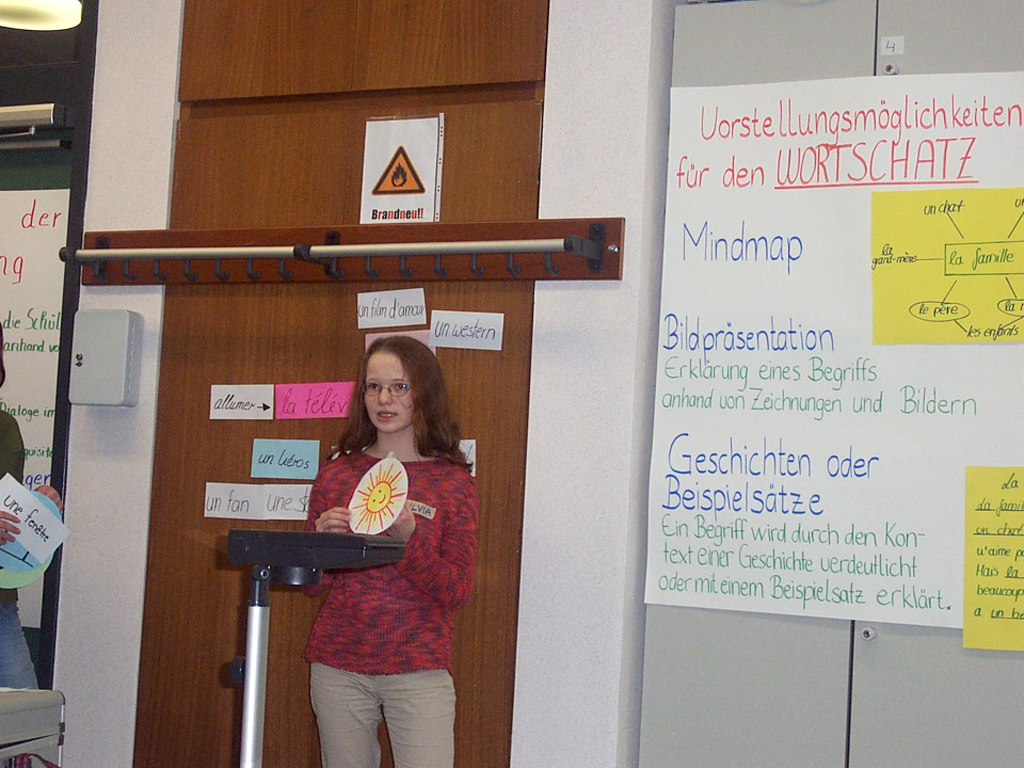
A German student learning French. English (1.5 billion learners), French (82 million learners) and Chinese (30 million learners) are the three most commonly studied foreign languages.

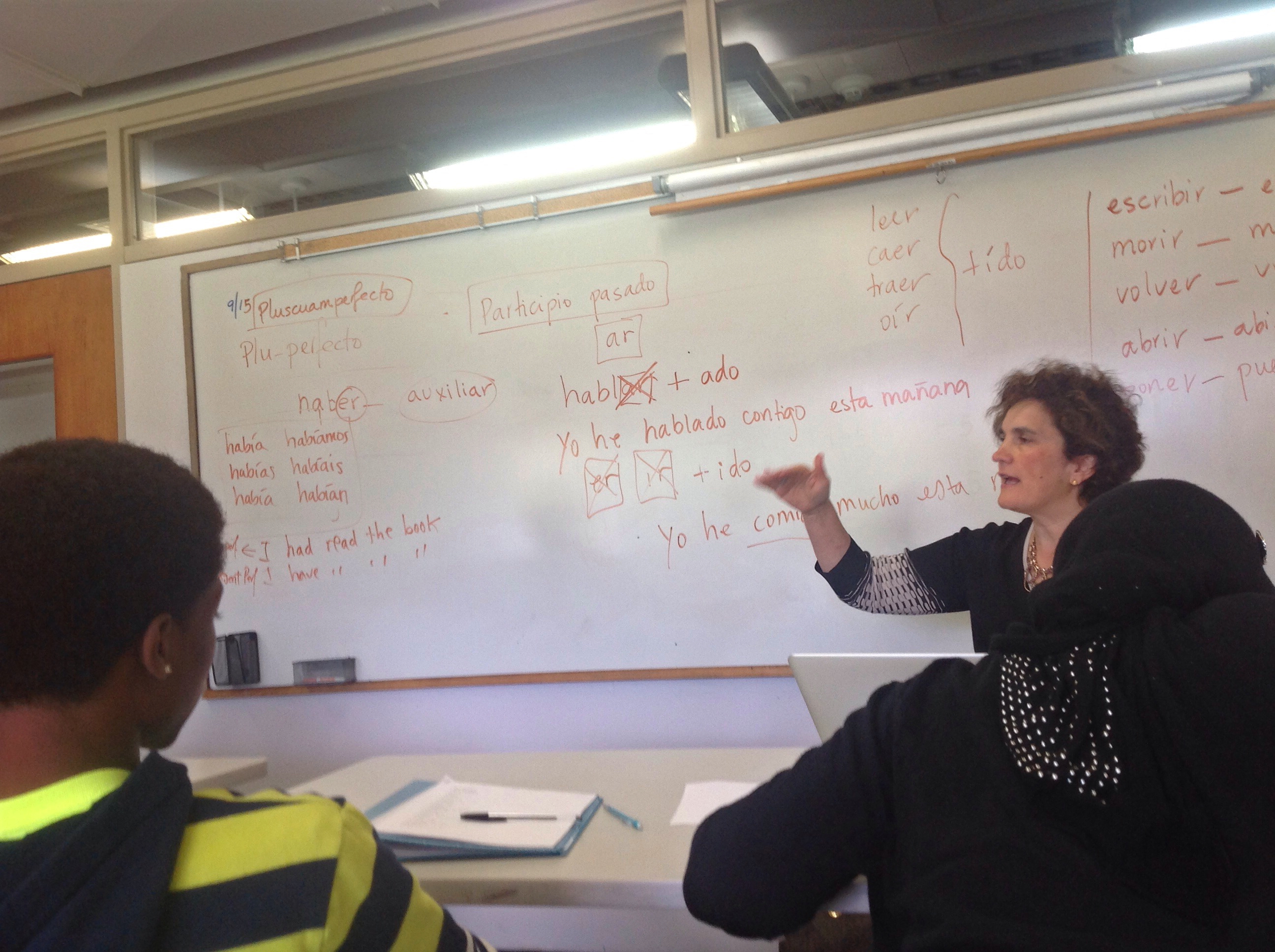
Spanish taught as a second language to a class of native English speakers at an American private school in Massachusetts

In pedagogy and sociolinguistics, a distinction is made between second language and foreign language, the latter is being learned for use in an area where that language is originally from another country and not spoken in the native country of the speakers. And in other words, foreign language is used from the perspective of countries; the second language is used from the perspective of individuals.

For example, English in countries such as India, Pakistan, Sri Lanka, Bangladesh, the Philippines, the Nordic countries and the Netherlands is considered a second language by many of its speakers, because they learn it young and use it regularly; indeed in parts of South Asia it is the official language of the courts, government and business. The same can be said for French in Algeria, Morocco and Tunisia, although French is not an official language in any of them. In practice, French is widely used in a variety of contexts in these countries, and signs are normally printed in both Arabic and French. A similar phenomenon exists in post-Soviet states such as Ukraine, Uzbekistan, Kyrgyzstan and Kazakhstan, where Russian can be considered a second language, and there are large Russophone communities.

However, unlike in Hong Kong, English is considered a foreign language in China owing to the lack of opportunities for use, such as historical links, media, conversation between people, and common vocabulary. Likewise, French would be considered a foreign language in Romania and Moldova, even though both French and Romanian are Romance languages, Romania's historical links to France, and all being members of la Francophonie.

In general, it is believed that children have an advantage in learning foreign languages compared to adults. However, studies have shown that pre-existing knowledge of language and grammar rules, as well as a superior ability to memorize vocabulary, may benefit adults when learning foreign languages.

== Data ==
=== Weber's report ===
George H. J. Weber, a Swiss businessman and independent scholar, founder of the Andaman Association and creator of the encyclopedic andaman.org Web site, made a report in December 1997 about the number of secondary speakers of the world's leading languages. Weber used the Fischer Weltalmanach of 1986 as his primary and only source for the L2-speakers data, in preparing the data in the following table. These numbers are here compared with those referred to by Ethnologue, a popular source in the linguistics field. See below Table 1.

Language	L2 speakers (Weltalmanach 1986)	L2 speakers (Ethnologue.com 2023)
1. English	190 million	1.077 billion
2. Mandarin	20 million	199 million
3. Hindi-Urdu	150 million	266 million
4. Spanish	20 million	74 million
5. French	270 million	229 million
6. Russian	125 million	108 million
7. Arabic	21 million	274 million
8. Portuguese	28 million	27 million
9. German	80 million	58 million
10. Japanese	8 million	100 thousand

=== Later data ===
Collecting the number of second language speakers of every language is extremely difficult and even the best estimates contain guess work. The data below is from ethnologue.com as of June 2013.

The world's most spoken language by native speakers
Language	Speakers (million)
Mandarin	918
Spanish	476
English	335
Hindi-Urdu	330
Bengali	230
Arabic	223
Portuguese	202
Russian	162
Japanese	122
Javanese	84.3

The world's top 12 most spoken languages by total speakers (as of October 2026)
Language	speakers (million)
English	1500
Mandarin	1200
Hindi-Urdu	857
Spanish	561
Arabic	335
French	333
Bengali/Sylhetti	274
Portuguese	269
Malay/Indonesian	255
Russian	210
German	133
Japanese	126

== See also ==
- Foreign language writing aid
- Foreign language reading aid
- Computer-assisted language learning
- Diglossia
- Language education

== Bibliography ==
- Beerten, Roeland; Billiet, Jaak; Maddens, Bart (2003). "National Identity and Attitude Toward Foreigners in a Multinational State: A Replication". International Society of Political Psychology. 2. 24 (2): 241–257. doi:10.1111/0162-895X.00327. JSTOR 3792350.
- Canale, M. "Canale M". Archived from the original on 2022-01-20.
- Canale, M.; Swain, M. (1980). "Theoretical bases of communicative approaches to second language teaching and testing". Applied Linguistics. 1 (1): 1–47. doi:10.1093/applin/1.1.1 (inactive 4 June 2026). hdl:11059/14798.
- Doggett, G (1994). "Eight Approaches to Language Teaching". Mosaic. 27 (2): 8–12.
- Gauthier, Karine; Genesee, Fred (March 2011). "Language Development in Internationally Adopted Children: A Special Case of Early Second Language Learning". Child Development. 82 (3): 887–901. doi:10.1111/j.1467-8624.2011.01578.x. PMID 21413938. S2CID 8903620.
- Hyltenstam, Kenneth (1992). "Non-native Features of Near-native Speakers: On the Ultimate Attainment of Childhood L2 Learners". Advances in Psychology. 83: 351–368. doi:10.1016/S0166-4115(08)61505-8. ISBN 978-0-444-88922-5.
- Hyltenstam, K.; Abrahamsson, N. (2003). "Maturational Constraints in SLA". In Doughty, C. J.; Long, M. H. (eds.). The Handbook of Second Language Acquisition. Malden, Massachusetts: Blackwell. ISBN 1-4051-3281-7.
- Jacob, Brian (Aug 1995). "Defining Culture in a Multicultural Environment: An Ethnography of Heritage High School". American Journal of Education. 4. 103 (4). University of Chicago Press: 339–376. doi:10.1086/444107. JSTOR 1085750. S2CID 143732020.
- Johnson, Jacqueline; Newport, Elissa (January 1989). "Critical period effects in second language learning: The influence of maturational state on the acquisition of English as a second language". Cognitive Psychology. 21 (1): 60–99. doi:10.1016/0010-0285(89)90003-0. PMID 2920538. S2CID 15842890.
- Krashen, Stephen D.; Long, Michael A.; Scarcella, Robin C. (1979). "Age, Rate and Eventual Attainment in Second Language Acquisition". TESOL Quarterly. 13 (4): 573–582. doi:10.2307/3586451. JSTOR 3586451.
- Krashen, S.D. (1982). Principles and Practice in Second Language Acquisition (PDF). Oxford: Pergamon.
- Mitchell, Rosamond; Myles, Florence (2004). "The recent history of second language learning research". Second Language Learning Theories (2 ed.). Hodder Education. ISBN 978-0340807668.
- Levis, John (Autumn 2005). "Changing Contexts and Shifting Paradigms in Pronunciation Teaching". TESOL Quarterly. 39 (3): 369–377. CiteSeerX 10.1.1.466.9352. doi:10.2307/3588485. JSTOR 3588485.
- Mollica, A.; Neussel, F. (1997). "The good language learner and the good language teacher: A review of the literature and classroom applications". Mosaic. 4 (3): 1–16.
- Opitz, Bertram; Degner, Juliane (July 2012). "Emotionality in a second language: It's a matter of time" (PDF). Neuropsychologia. 50 (8): 1961–1967. doi:10.1016/j.neuropsychologia.2012.04.021. PMID 22569217. S2CID 1625668. Archived (PDF) from the original on 2020-08-06.
- Özgür, Burcu; Griffiths, Carol (25 January 2013). "Second Language Motivation". Procedia - Social and Behavioral Sciences. 70: 1109–1114. doi:10.1016/j.sbspro.2013.01.165.
- Pratt, Mary (1991). "Arts of the Contact Zone". Profession. Modern Language Association: 33–40. JSTOR 25595469.
- Rubin, Joan (1975). "What the "Good Language Learner" Can Teach Us". TESOL Quarterly. 9 (1): 41–51. doi:10.2307/3586011. JSTOR 3586011.
- Russell, Victoria (2009). "Corrective feedback, over a decade of research since Lyster and Ranta (1997): Where do we stand today?" (PDF). Electronic Journal of Foreign Language Teaching. 6 (1): 21–31. Archived (PDF) from the original on 20 April 2017.
- Selinker, L. (1972). "Interlanguage". International Review of Applied Linguistics. 10 (1–4): 209–241. doi:10.1515/iral.1972.10.1-4.209.
- Selinker, Larry; Lamendella, John T. (1978). "Two perspectives on fossilization in interlanguage learning". Interlanguage Studies Bulletin. 3 (2): 143–191. JSTOR 43136004.
- Spada, Nina; Lightbown, Patsy M. (2010) [2002]. "Second Language Acquisition". In Norbert Schmitt (ed.). An Introduction to Applied Linguistics. Hodder Education. ISBN 9780340984475.
- Stern, H. H. (March 1975). "What Can We Learn from the Good Language Learner?". Canadian Modern Language Review. 31 (4): 304–318. doi:10.3138/cmlr.31.4.304.
