= 68 Silver Street =

Historic house in Enfield, London

Coordinates: 51°39′15″N 0°04′51″W

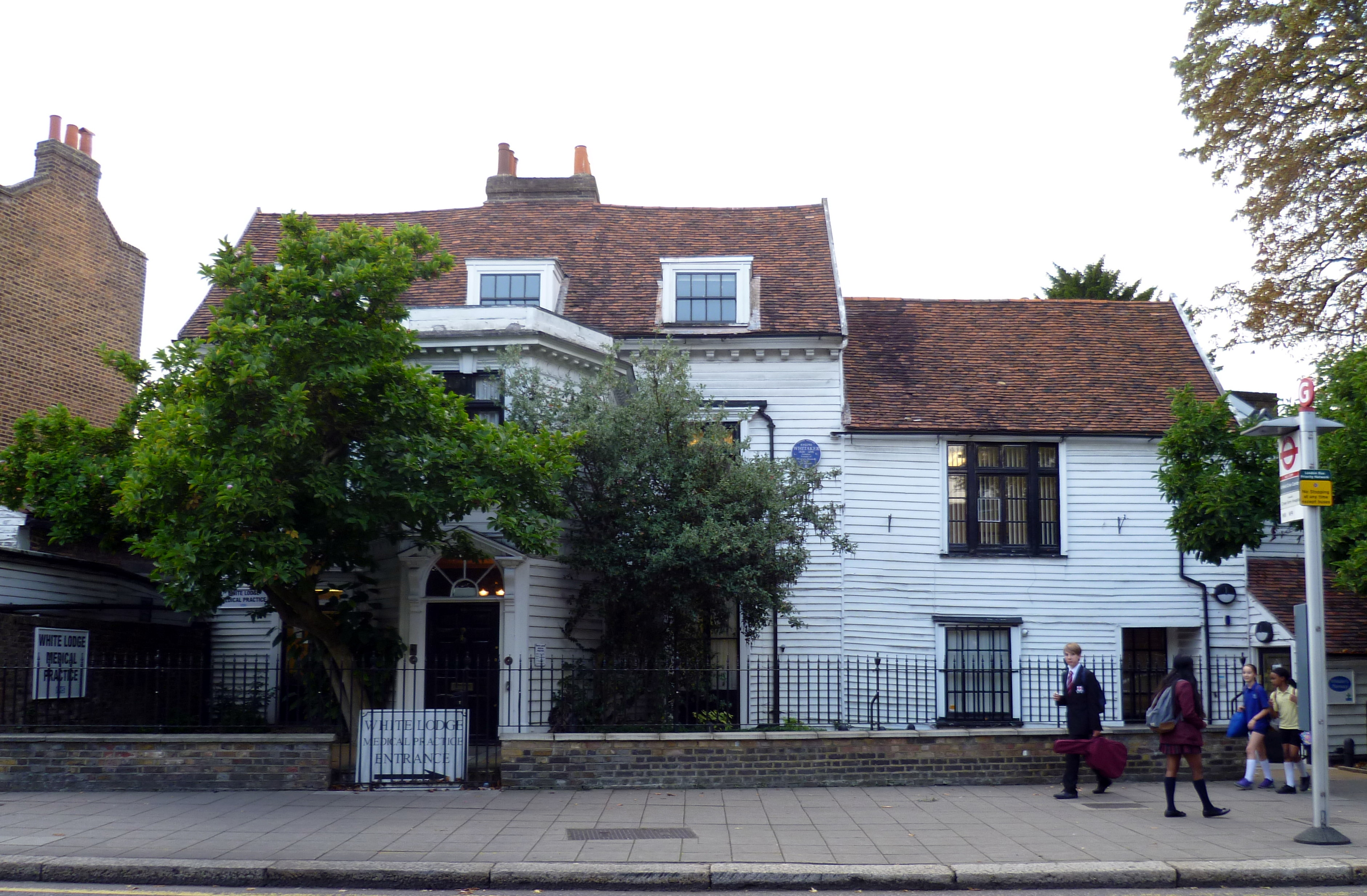
68 Silver Street

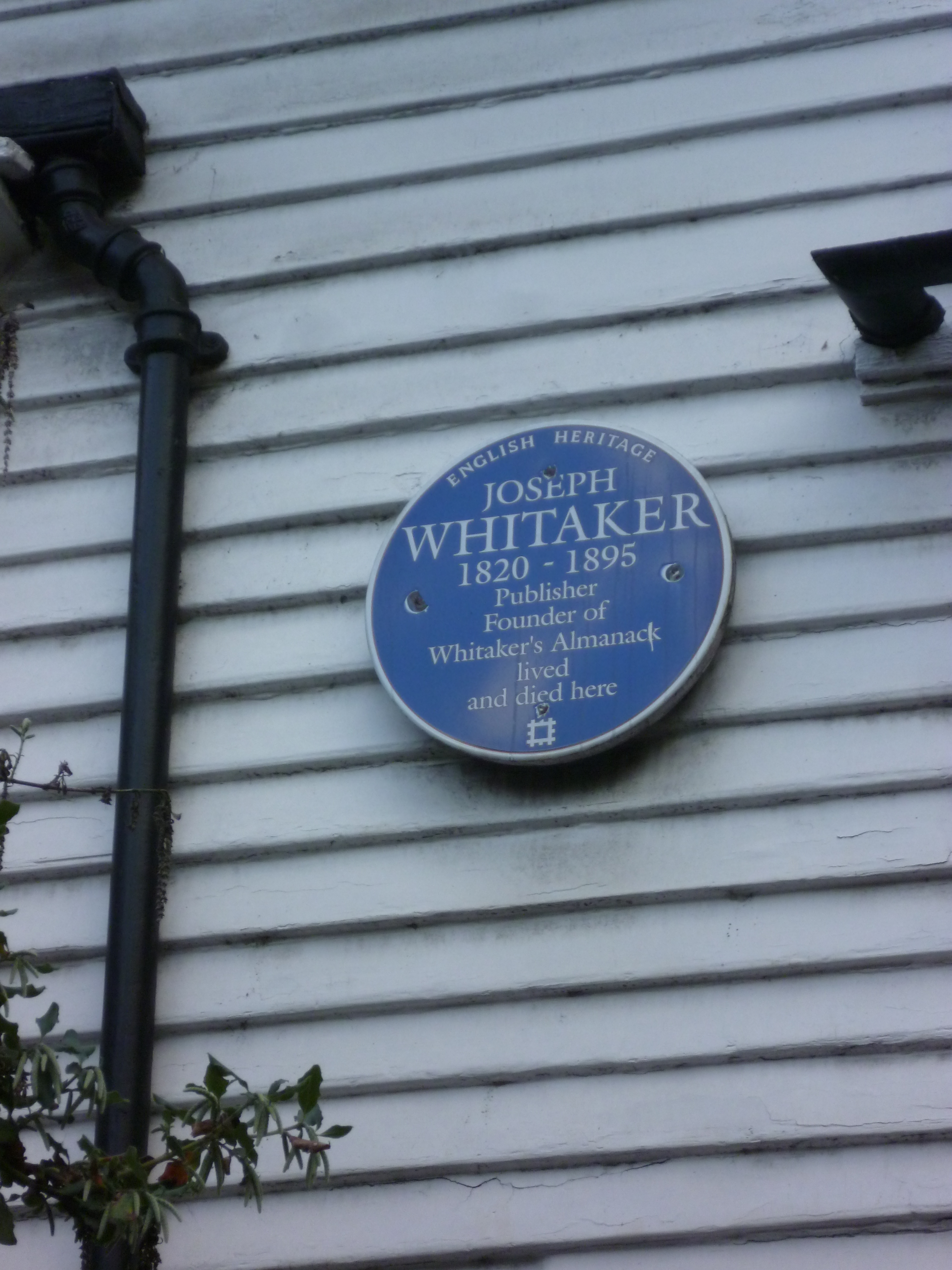
Plaque

White Lodge, 68 Silver Street is a grade II listed building in Silver Street, Enfield, London. It was built in around the 17th century with later amendments. It was the home of Jacob Vale Asbury, Charles Lamb's doctor, and later of Joseph Whitaker, the publisher and founder of Whitaker's Almanack who lived at the house from 1862 until his death in 1895.
