= The World Factbook =

Reference book produced by the CIA

- Emblem
- Language: American English
- Subject: General
- Genre: Almanac about the countries of the world
- Publisher: Central Intelligence Agency
- Publication date: See frequency of updates and availability, discontinued February 2026
- Publication place: United States
- Website: The World Factbook at the Wayback Machine (archived January 31, 2026)

The World Factbook, also known as the CIA World Factbook, is a reference book that was produced and published by the US Central Intelligence Agency (CIA) from 1962 to 2026 with almanac-style information about the countries of the world. From 1971 it was not classified, and available to the public in print since 1975, initially by the CIA, and later the Government Publishing Office. The Factbook was also available via a website where it could be downloaded. It provided a two- to three-page summary of the demographics, geography, communications, government, economy, and military of 258 international entities, including US-recognized countries, dependencies, and other areas in the world.

The World Factbook was prepared by the CIA for the use of US government officials, and its style, format, coverage, and content were primarily designed to meet their requirements. As a work of the US government, it is in the public domain in the United States. It has frequently been used as a resource for academic research papers and news articles.

On February 4, 2026, following the restriction and closure since 2025 of other government-funded information websites, the CIA announced, with no warning and no explanation, that The World Factbook was discontinued. The Factbook is still accessible in print and via archives by the Internet Archive, Mozilla Data Collective, and Factbook Archive. A group of volunteers subsequently launched OpenFactBook, a community-run successor website with much of the same underlying information as The World Factbook.

== Data ==
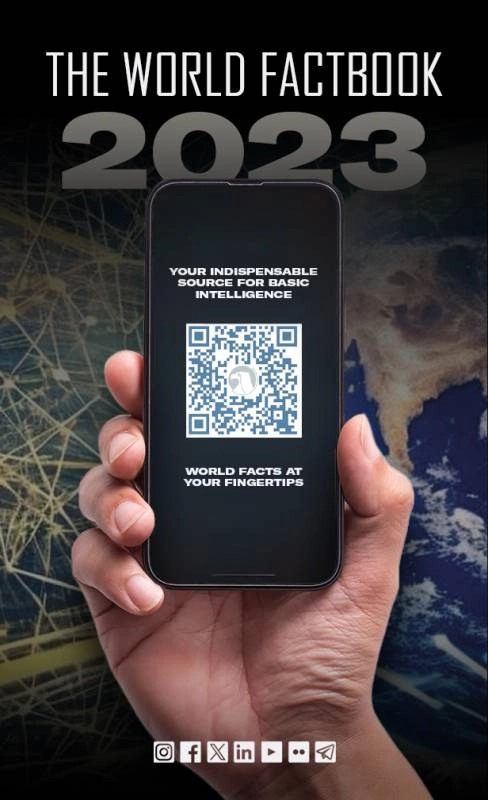
Cover of the US government print edition of The World Factbook (2023 edition)

=== Sources ===
In researching the Factbook, the CIA used the sources listed below, among other public and private sources.

- Antarctic Information Program (National Science Foundation)
- Armed Forces Medical Intelligence Center (Department of Defense)
- Bureau of the Census (Department of Commerce)
- Bureau of Labor Statistics (Department of Labor)
- Council of Managers of National Antarctic Programs
- Defense Intelligence Agency (Department of Defense)
- Department of Energy
- Department of State
- Fish and Wildlife Service (Department of the Interior)
- Maritime Administration (Department of Transportation)
- National Geospatial-Intelligence Agency (Department of Defense)
- Naval Facilities Engineering Command (Department of Defense)
- Office of Insular Affairs (Department of the Interior)
- Office of Naval Intelligence (Department of Defense)
- Oil & Gas Journal
- United States Board on Geographic Names (Department of the Interior)
- United States Transportation Command (Department of Defense)

=== Structure ===
Information on the listed entities was provided in the following categories: "introduction or background, geography, people, government, economy, communications, transportation, military, and transnational issues."

== Copyright ==
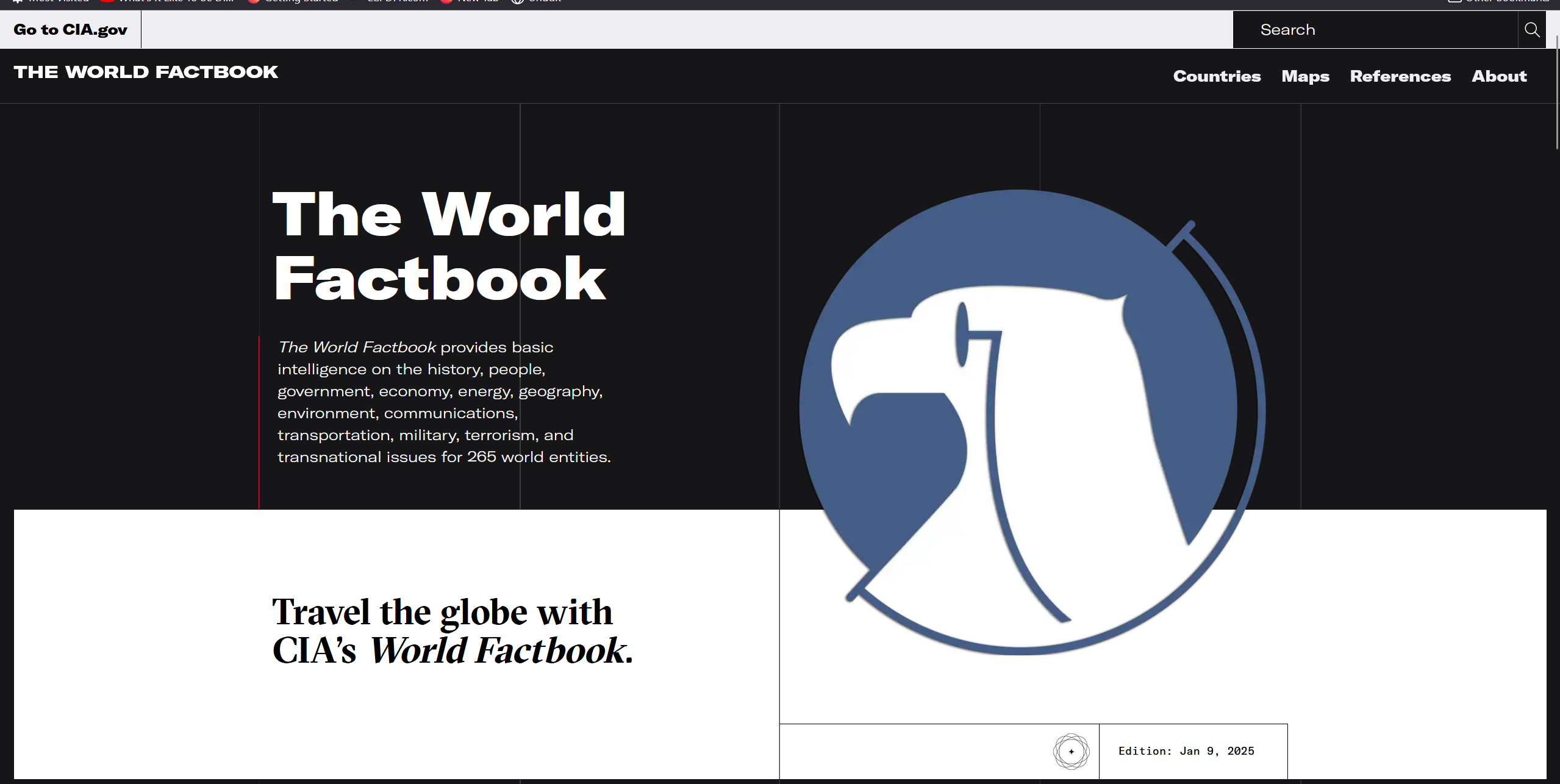
The World Factbook website as it appeared in January 2025

As a work of the US government, the Factbook is in the public domain and can be redistributed in part or in whole without need for permission, although the CIA requested that the Factbook be cited if used. Copying the official seal of the CIA without permission is prohibited by the US federal Central Intelligence Agency Act of 1949 (50 U.S.C. § 403m).

== Frequency of updates and availability ==
Before November 2001, The World Factbook website was updated yearly; from 2004 to 2010 it was updated every two weeks; From 2010 to 2026 it was updated weekly. Generally, information available as of January 1 of the current year was used in preparing the Factbook. Following efforts by CIA director John Ratcliffe to "end programs that don't advance the agency's core missions", the Factbook was discontinued on February 4, 2026, with all pages on its website made inaccessible. No reason was given for the discontinuation.

=== Government edition ===
The first classified edition of Factbook was published in August 1962, and the first unclassified version in June 1971. The World Factbook was first available to the public in print in 1975. Until 2008 the CIA printed the Factbook; from then until its discontinuation it was printed by the Government Printing Office following a CIA decision to "focus Factbook resources" on the online edition. In 2017, the printed book was officially discontinued. The Factbook was made available via the World Wide Web beginning October 1994, receiving about six million visits per month in 2006; it was also available for download. The official printed version was sold by the Government Printing Office and National Technical Information Service. In past years, the Factbook was available on CD-ROM, microfiche, magnetic tape, and floppy disk.

=== Reprints and older editions online ===
Many Internet sites use information and images from the CIA World Factbook. Several publishers, including Grand River Books, Potomac Books (formerly known as Brassey's Inc.), and Skyhorse Publishing have published the Factbook in recent years. Older editions since 2000 were available for download (but not browsing) from the Factbook website until 2026 and can be found in print or online archives.

=== Discontinuation ===
Without previous warning, on February 4, 2026 the project's URL was redirected to a page announcing that The World Factbook had been discontinued. No explanation was given, and the CIA refused to comment on the record. The director stated the objective was to "end programs that don't advance the agency's core missions", in the unusual move to remove government bloat and terminate programs not relevant to the important matters of the Agency. All versions were removed from the CIA's website immediately, disrupting academic uses such as by the Boston University Questrom School of Business, which was using it for open-book tests. The Mozilla Data Collective has since published a dataset that includes the 260 world entities listed in the Factbook, capturing "the final state of the public data (Jan 23, 2026) before the official website was retired." There is also another website called "Factbook Archive" that contains the information of The World Factbook from 1990 to 2025. A group of volunteers subsequently launched OpenFactBook, a community-maintained website intended as a successor to the Factbook, with much of the same underlying information.

The news channel CNN linked the discontinuation to other restrictions and closures of government-funded information websites under the second Trump administration, including closure of health sites, and restrictions on the Smithsonian Institution and the National Park Service.

== Entities listed ==
Map of the world published by the CIA World Factbook in 2016

As of July 2011, The World Factbook comprised 266 entities, which can be divided into the following categories:

Independent countries
The CIA defines these as people "politically organized into a sovereign state with a definite territory." In this category, there are 195 entities.
Others
Places set apart from the list of independent countries. There are two of these: Taiwan and the European Union.
Dependencies and Areas of Special Sovereignty
Places affiliated with another country. They may be subcategorized by affiliated country:
- Australia: 6 entities
- China: 2 entities
- Denmark: 2 entities
- France: 8 entities
- Netherlands: 3 entities
- New Zealand: 3 entities
- Norway: 3 entities
- United Kingdom: 17 entities
- United States: 14 entities
Miscellaneous
Antarctica and places in dispute. There are six such entities.
Other entities
The World and the oceans. There are five oceans and the World (the World entry is intended as a summary of the other entries).

== Reception ==
Reference Reviews reviewed the online edition of The World Factbook in 2016, praising its "up-to-date facts and figures" through its weekly updates while expressing concern over its usability due to difficult content navigation and inadequate font sizes.

The Factbook has been criticized for serving the interests of the United States by controlling the manner in which other countries are represented and for adopting, at least in some cases, an ahistorical perspective.

== See also ==
- National Security Agency
- World Leaders, another regular publication of the CIA

Alternative publications

- Europa World Year Book
- The New York Times Almanac
- The TIME Almanac
- Whitaker's Almanack
- The World Almanac

Original (Year)	Archive (Date)
University of Missouri–St. Louis
1992	June 11, 2008
1993	July 5, 2008
1994	July 9, 2008
1995	June 20, 2008
1996	October 1, 2008
1997	July 19, 2008
1998	October 1, 2008
1999	October 1, 2008
2000	June 27, 2008
2001	June 15, 2008
2002	May 26, 2008
2003	June 15, 2008
2004	June 15, 2008
2005	May 13, 2008
2006	March 23, 2022
2007	June 12, 2008
2008	April 1, 2009
GPO Permanent Access
1991	May 11, 2011
1990	May 11, 2011
Theodora.com
1989	—
Geographic.org
1987	—
1985	—
1982	—
AllCountries.org
1986	—
WorkMall.com
1984	—
