= Joseph Whitaker (publisher) =

English publisher

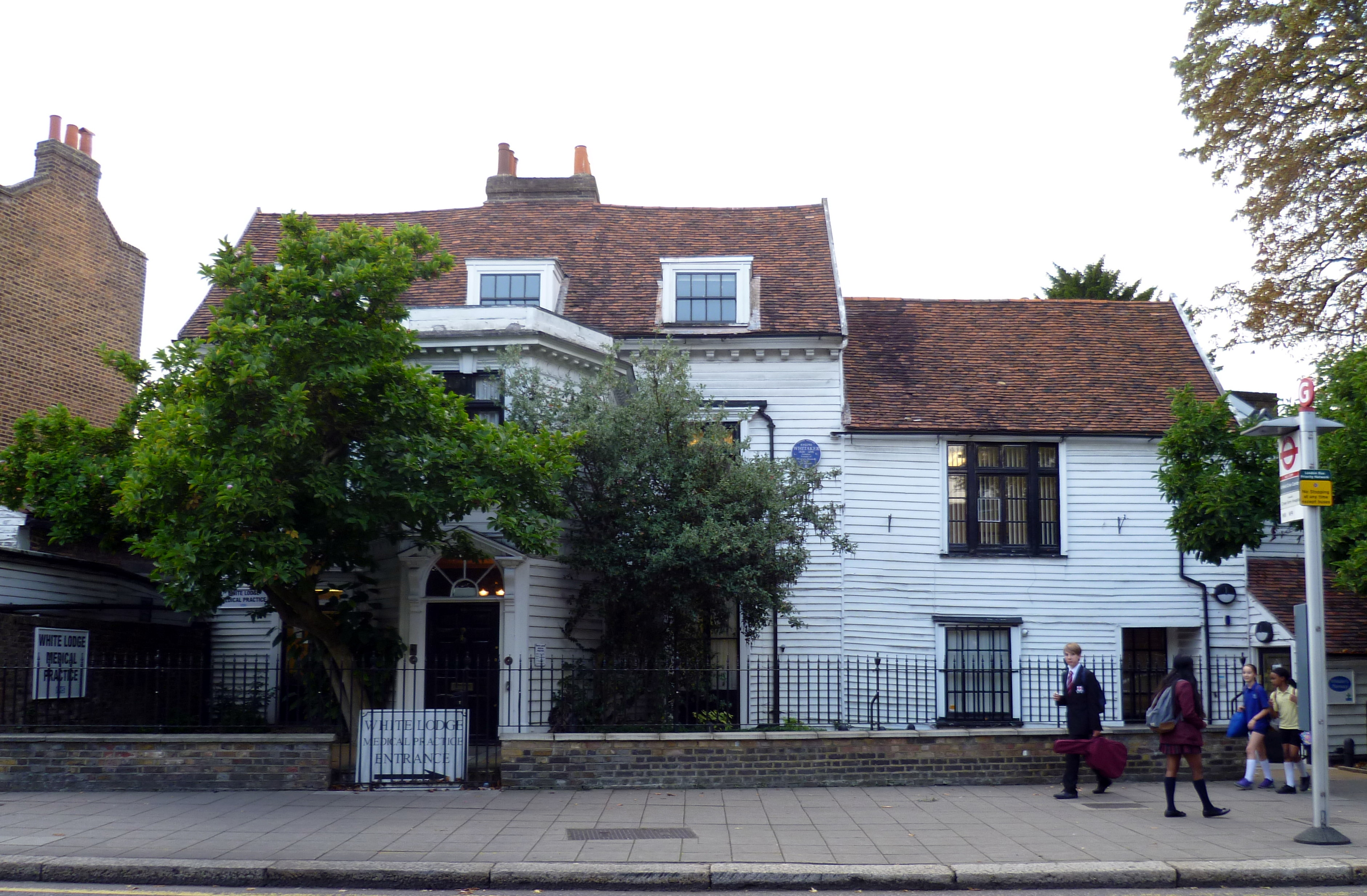
68 Silver Street

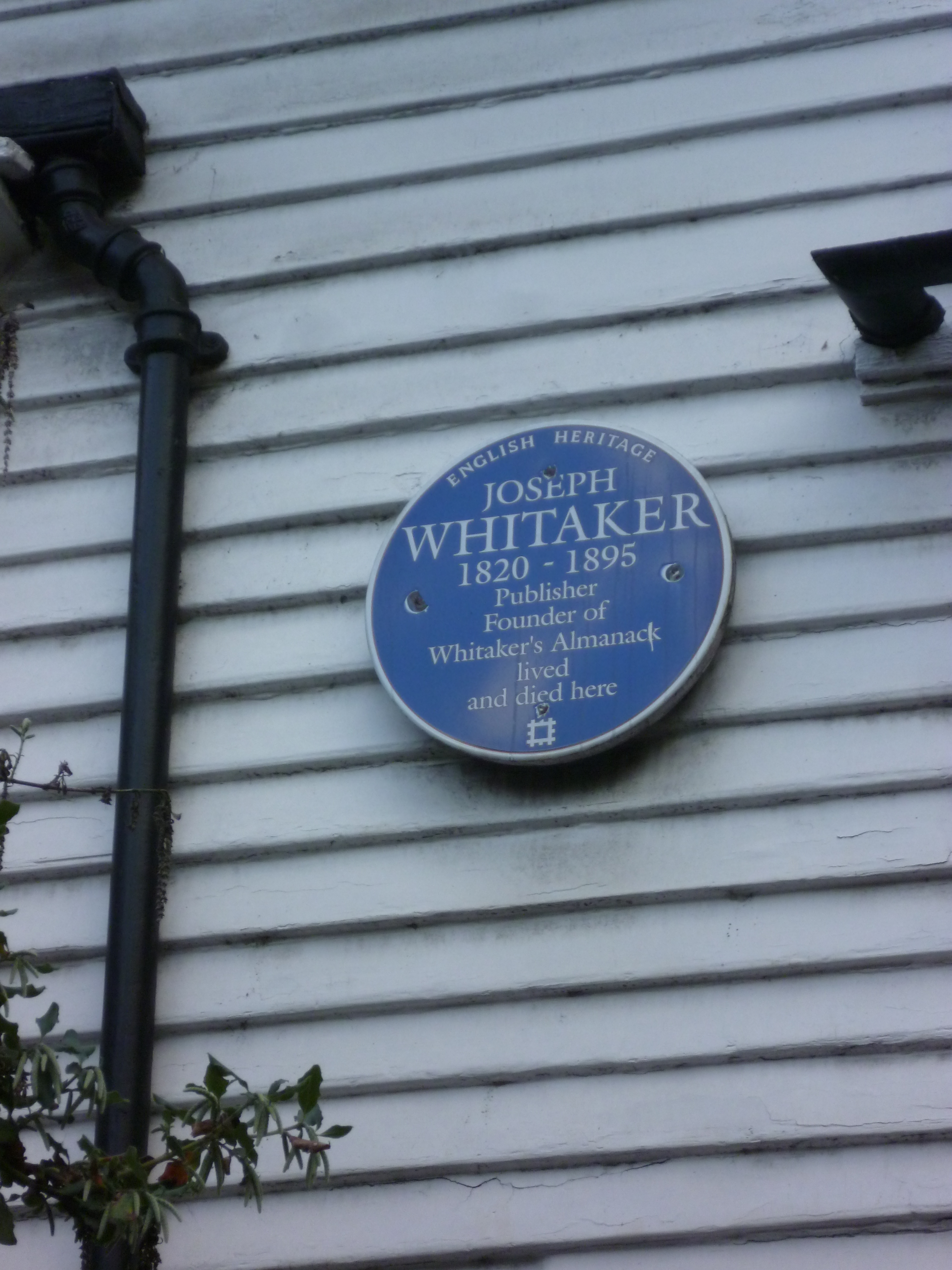
Plaque to Whitaker on 68 Silver Street

Joseph Whitaker (4 May 1820 – 15 May 1895) was a publisher who founded Whitaker's Almanack.

== Early life ==
Joseph Whitaker was born in London, and apprenticed to a bookseller at the age of fourteen.

== Career ==
After years of experience at various bookselling firms, he undertook his own business as a publisher, first as J. Whitaker and later as J. Whitaker & Sons. Early publications were theological works. In January 1858 he launched The Bookseller and in 1869 published the first issue of Whitaker's Almanack, a reference annual, which met with immediate (and lasting) success.

In 1874 he launched the Reference Catalogue of Current Literature, whose goal to "anthologiz[e] publishers' catalogues". This reference work went through numerous editions.

He helped "organize and distribute relief funds for Parisian booksellers" following the Franco-Prussian War (1870–71).

== Personal life ==
He was the father of fifteen children; the eldest, Joseph Vernon Whitaker was editor of the American Literary Gazette, and later returned to England to become editor of the Bookseller and the Reference Catalogue. Cuthbert Whitaker, the twelfth child, succeeded his father as editor of the Almanack.

A fourth-generation descendant, David Whitaker, was involved with the development of International Standard Book Numbers.

Whitaker died at 68 Silver Street, Enfield, on 15 May 1895, where he had lived since 1862. He was buried at West Norwood Cemetery.

The British bookseller and publisher George Byrom Whittaker (1793–1847) was not related to Joseph Whitaker.

== References and sources ==
Sources

- Tedder, Henry Richard (1900). "Whitaker, Joseph" . In Lee, Sidney (ed.). Dictionary of National Biography. Vol. 61. London: Smith, Elder & Co.
- H. R. Tedder, Whitaker, Joseph (1820–1895) rev. Joseph Coohill, Oxford Dictionary of National Biography, 2004 (Subscription required)
