= Cuthbert Whitaker =

Editor of Whitaker's Almanack from 1895 to 1950

Sir Cuthbert Wilfred Whitaker (26 May 1873 – 1950) was editor of Whitaker's Almanack. He held the position for fifty-five years, succeeding his father Joseph Whitaker when he died in 1895, and was in turn succeeded by a nephew on his death. He was elected a fellow of the Society of Antiquaries of London in 1914.

He was Chairman of the City of London Food Control Committee during the Second World War, and was knighted in 1946 for services to the City of London Corporation.

Whitaker was a Councilman for the ward of Farringdon Within from 1905. In 1944 he led the initiative to found the Guildhall Historical Association on 16 June 1944.
