= The Bookseller =

British magazine

- Cover of 20 September 2024 issue
- Editor: Philip Jones
- Former editors: Nicholas Clee; Louis Baum; Neill Denny
- Categories: Publishing, books
- Frequency: Weekly
- Circulation: 30,000
- First issue: 1858; 168 years ago
- Company: formerly Bookseller Media Ltd., now the Stage Media Company Ltd.
- Country: United Kingdom
- Based in: London, England
- Language: English
- Website: www.thebookseller.com
- ISSN: 0006-7539

The Bookseller is a British magazine reporting news on the publishing industry. Philip Jones is editor-in-chief of the weekly print edition of the magazine and the website. The magazine is home to the Bookseller/Diagram Prize for Oddest Title of the Year, a humorous award given annually to the book with the oddest title. The award is organised by The Bookseller's diarist, Horace Bent, and had been administered in recent years by the former deputy editor, Joel Rickett, and former charts editor, Philip Stone. We Love This Book is its quarterly sister consumer website and email newsletter.

The subscription-only magazine is read by around 30,000 persons each week, in more than 90 countries, and contains the latest news from the publishing and bookselling worlds, in-depth analysis, pre-publication book previews and author interviews. It is the first publication to publish official weekly bestseller lists in the UK. It has also created the first UK-based e-book sales ranking. The website is visited by 160,000 unique users each month.

The magazine also produces approximately a dozen specials on an annual basis, including its Books of the Year and four "Buyers Guides". The Bookseller also publishes three daily newspapers at the annual London Book Fair, in April, the Bologna Children's Book Fair and the Frankfurt Book Fair, in October.

== History ==
The Bookseller was founded by Joseph Whitaker, the first editor of the magazine, in January 1858, and was marketed as "A Handbook of British and Foreign Literature". His sons, Joseph Vernon Whitaker and George Herbert Whitaker took over editorship of The Bookseller in 1875 and 1895 respectively, with George Herbert Whitaker taking the decision in 1909 to move the magazine from a monthly to a weekly publication. However, World War I severely disrupted publication and it was not until the late 1920s that the magazine resumed its weekly schedule. In 1928, The Bookseller entered troublesome years, with the magazine entering joint editorial control between both The Publishers Association and the Booksellers Association. It was edited by the Publishers Association president Geoffrey S. Williams and became known as The Publisher and Bookseller. However, the decision proved less than successful, and in 1933 the decision was reversed, with editorship being awarded to Edmond Segrave – 28 years old at the time. He remained in charge for almost 40 years.

In 1945, he hired Philothea Thompson as his personal assistant, and when Segrave died in 1971, she took over stewardship of the magazine until 1976. David Whitaker joined his family magazine in 1977 for little over two years, with Louis Baum assuming editorial responsibilities in 1980. Under Baum, the magazine saw radical change, with numerous design changes, culminating in the decision to become a full-colour publication in the late 1990s. The self-named "legendary diarist" Horace Bent made his first appearance during this time (although "his" Bookseller/Diagram Prize for Oddest Title of the Year began in the late 1970s), while the magazine also began to feature the first Nielsen BookScan bestseller lists.

In 1999, Nicholas Clee became editor, months before the magazine was sold to a division of Nielsen Business Media. In 2004, Retail Week's Neill Denny arrived and oversaw another major redesign, which included the controversial decision to move its "Publications of the Week" information online only. Denny was succeeded as editor in 2012 by Philip Jones.

== Modern day ==
Following the demise of Publishing News (1979–2008), The Bookseller is the only paper magazine reporting on the UK publishing, bookselling and library industry on a weekly basis, although the magazine also includes frequent stories, features and columns from the international scene. Many individuals from the UK book trade have contributed to the magazine via the opinion columns, including Kate Mosse and Anthony Horowitz, while the website provides a forum for anyone to voice their opinions on news and features concerning the trade. In 2010, The Bookseller was acquired from Nielsen by its then Managing Director, Nigel Roby.

In August 2020, the magazine was purchased by the Stage Media Company Ltd., the publishers of The Stage, with the two publications expected to run independently of each other. The Bookseller now administers the annual British Book Awards (or "Nibbies"), which were launched in 1990 to celebrate the best books, bookshops, and publishers, as well as achievers in other categories of the industry, "recognising that a book's success is not down to just one factor".

== See also ==
- Books+Publishing – Similar trade magazine covering book publishing industry in Australia
- Publishers Weekly – Similar trade magazine covering book publishing industry in United States
