= The TIME Almanac =

- 1998 edition
- Language: American English
- Subject: General
- Genre: Almanac
- Publisher: Information Please LLC
- Publication date: 1947-2013
- Publication place: United States
- Media type: Almanac
- OCLC: 38222513
- Website: www.infoplease.com/almanacs.html

The TIME Almanac was an almanac published in the United States. The almanac was first published in 1947 as the Information Please Almanac by Dan Golenpaul. The name was changed with the 1999 edition when Time magazine bought naming rights to the almanac.

Information Please was created in 1947 from the host and panelists from the popular radio show by the same name. The radio show which began in 1938 and consisted of a panel of information experts that answered questions sent in by the public. The fact experts answered questions over the air and when the panelists were not able to give a correct answer they used humor instead. Host Clifton Fadiman edited and helped publish the first edition in 1947. In 1997, the Information Please Almanac merged with Time. The Time Almanac for Kids with Information Please was first published in 2000.

With the 2008 edition the almanac began a partnership with the Encyclopædia Britannica, and in 2013, the final edition was published. The Time Almanac for Kids continues in publication.

The almanac contained the following sections:

- "Current Events"
- "U.S. Government and History"
- "U.S. States Statistics"
- "Great Disasters"
- "Awards, Entertainment, and Culture"
- "People"

== Competing books ==
- The World Almanac and Book of Facts
- The CIA World Factbook
- Whitaker's Almanack
- The New York Times Almanac
- Europa World Year Book
