= Whitaker's Almanack =

British annual reference book

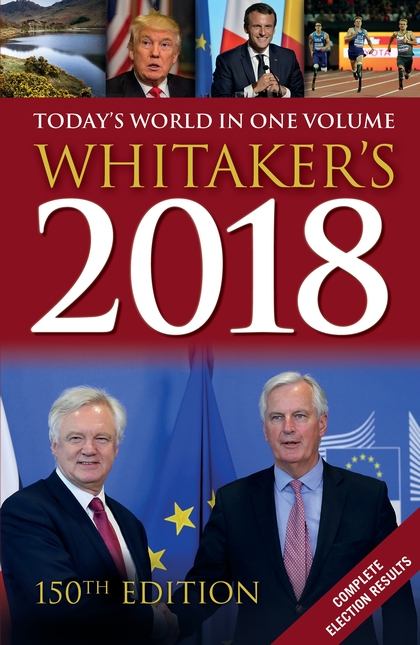
- 2018 edition
- Language: British English
- Subject: General
- Genre: Almanac
- Publisher: J Whitaker & Sons (1868–1997); The Stationery Office (1998–2003); A. & C. Black (2004–2020); Rebellion Publishing (2020–2021)
- Publication date: 1868–2021
- Publication place: United Kingdom
- Media type: Almanac
- OCLC: 220734304
- Website: www.whitakersalmanack.com

Whitaker's was a reference book, published annually in the United Kingdom. It was originally published by J. Whitaker & Sons from 1868 to 1997, next by HM Stationery Office until 2003 and then by A. & C. Black, which became a wholly owned subsidiary of Bloomsbury Publishing in 2011. The publication was acquired by Rebellion Publishing in 2020, with the 153rd edition appearing on 15 April 2021. In mid-2022, Rebellion announced that there would not be a 2022 edition and no further editions have appeared since then.

The almanack consisted of articles, lists, and tables on subjects such as education, the peerage, government departments, health and social issues, and the environment. It provided a directory of then-current countries, covering their recent history, politics, economy, and culture. Extensive astronomical data covering the forthcoming year were published at the rear of the book.

== First publication ==
Joseph Whitaker began preparing his almanack in the autumn of 1868. He postponed publication of the first edition on learning of the resignation of Benjamin Disraeli on 1 December 1868, so that he could include details of the new Gladstone administration. At the same time, Whitaker continued to expand the information so that the initially planned 329 pages grew to 370. The first edition of the almanack appeared on 23 December 1868, priced at 1 shilling, introduced by a short editorial piece written by Joseph Whitaker. It began "The Editor does not put forward this Almanack as perfect: yet he ventures to think that he has succeeded in preparing a work which will commend itself to those who desire to see improvement in this direction." It concluded by inviting critics to suggest ways in which improvements could be made.

The Manchester Guardian, reviewing the first edition, described it as "the largest of the cheap almanacks" to appear, and noted it contained a great deal more valuable information than other such works. In 2013, the 2014 edition became the first to be published under the new simpler branding of "Whitaker's".

== Content ==
Whitaker's Almanack consisted of articles, lists and tables on a wide range of subjects including education, the peerage, government departments, health and social issues, and the environment.

The largest section was the countries directory, which included recent history, politics, economic information and culture overviews. Each edition also featured a selection of critical essays focusing on events of the previous year. Extensive astronomical data covering the forthcoming year was published at the rear of the book.

Whitaker's was prized enough that Winston Churchill took a personal interest in the continued publication of the book after its headquarters were destroyed in the Blitz. A copy is also sealed in Cleopatra's Needle on the north bank of the River Thames.

== Formats ==
The almanack was published in two formats – the standard edition and a shortened concise edition. In previous years, a larger-format of the standard edition, bound in leather, was produced for libraries. In 2016, Whitaker's launched its online edition through its website, which was updated weekly with free-to-view and subscription only content.

== Editors ==
The almanack's most recent editor is Michael Rowley.

=== Editors since 1868 ===
There have been 11 editors since 1868:

- Joseph Whitaker (1868–1895)
- Sir Cuthbert Whitaker (1895–1950)
- F. H. C. Tatham (1950–1981)
- Richard Blake (1981–1986)
- Hilary Marsden (1986–1999)
- Lauren Simpson (1999–2004)
- Vanessa White (2001–2002)
- Inna Ward (2004–2008)
- Claire Fogg (2008–2010)
- Ruth Northey (2010–2020)
- Michael Rowley (2020–2021)

== Alternative publications ==
- The World Almanac and Book of Facts
- The World Factbook
- TIME Almanac with Information Please
- The New York Times Almanac
- Der Fischer Weltalmanach
- Europa World Year Book

== In popular culture ==
- Whitaker's Almanack provides the key to a book cipher message at the beginning of Arthur Conan Doyle's 1915 Sherlock Holmes novel The Valley of Fear. Lt. Cmdr. Data refers to the Almanack in his Holodeck portrayal of Holmes in the Star Trek: The Next Generation episode "Elementary, Dear Data."
- Whitaker's Almanack is mentioned in chapter 2 of Bram Stoker's Dracula, with a copy being owned by the Count.
- It is also mentioned in Virginia Woolf's short story "The Mark on the Wall", the James Bond novel Moonraker and Evelyn Waugh's Vile Bodies.
- In "The Round Dozen", a short story by W. Somerset Maugham, a character recalls being advised by a famous novelist that the two most useful books for a writer are the Bible and Whitaker's Almanack.
