= The World Almanac =

Reference work

World Almanac
- Author: Multiple
- Language: English
- Subject: Reference
- Publisher: World Almanac Books (imprint of Skyhorse Publishing)
- Publication date: December 10, 2024 (1st: 1868)
- Publication place: United States
- Media type: Printed Book
- Pages: 1,008
- ISBN: 978-1-5107-7246-5

The World Almanac and Book of Facts is a US-published reference work, an almanac conveying information about such subjects as world changes, tragedies, and sports feats. It has been published yearly from 1868 to 1875, and again every year since 1886.

== History ==
=== 19th century ===
The first edition of The World Almanac was published by the New York World newspaper in 1868 (the name of the publication comes from the newspaper itself, which was known as the World). Published three years after the end of the Civil War and the assassination of President Abraham Lincoln, its 120 pages of information touched on such events as the process of Reconstruction and the impeachment of President Andrew Johnson.

Publication was suspended in 1876, but in 1886, newspaper publisher Joseph Pulitzer, who had purchased the World and quickly transformed it into one of the most influential newspapers in the country, revived The World Almanac with the intention of making it "a compendium of universal knowledge." The World Almanac has been published annually since. From 1890 to 1934, the New York World Building was prominently featured on its cover.

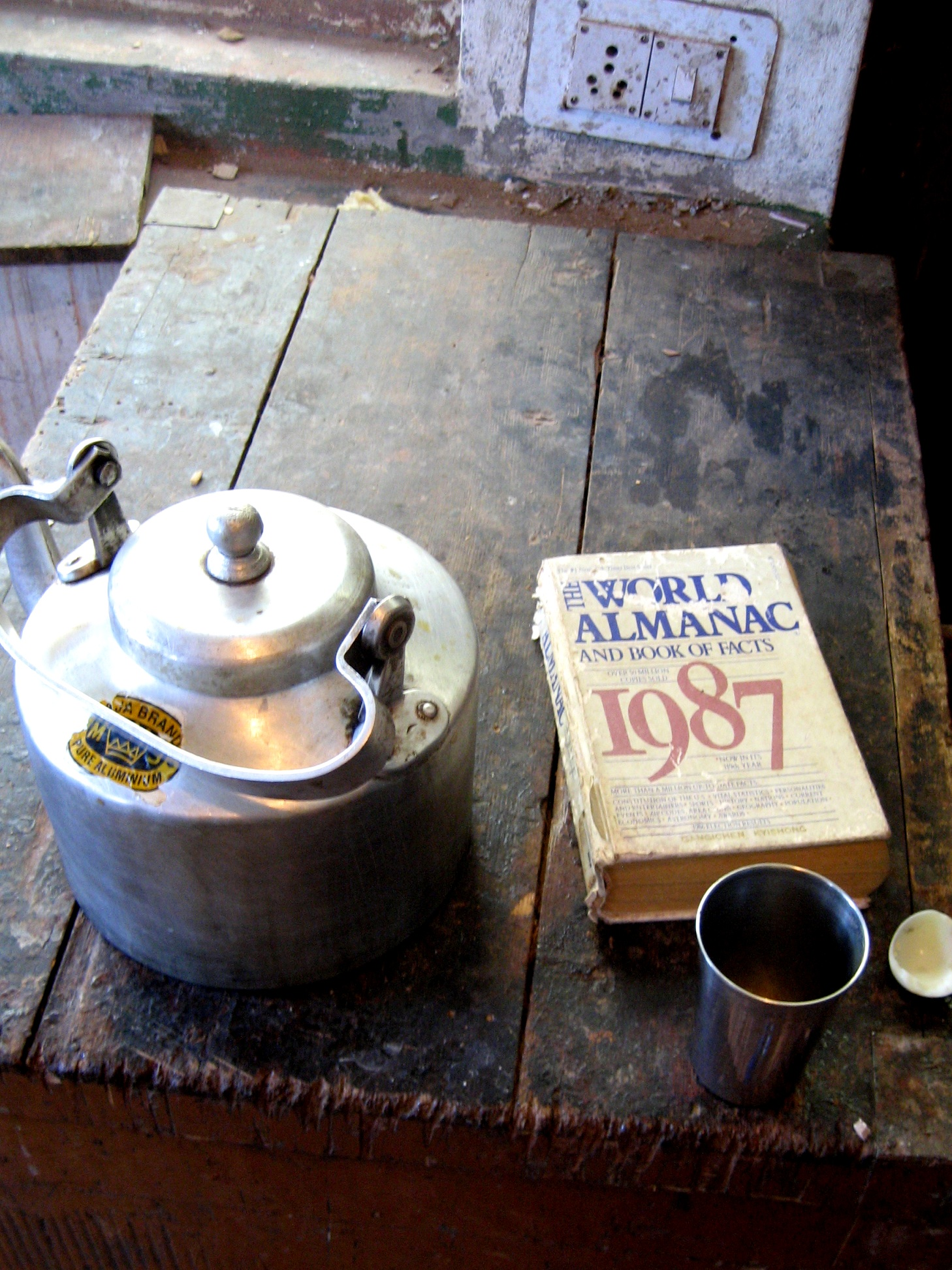
The World Almanac and Book of Facts, 1987, besides a tea kettle, TIPA, Dharamsala, India

In 1894, when it claimed more than a half-million "habitual users," The World Almanac changed its name to The World Almanac and Encyclopedia. This was the title it kept until 1923, when it became The World Almanac and Book of Facts, the name it bears today.

=== 20th century ===
In 1906, The New York Times, reporting on the publishing of the 20th edition, said that "the almanac has made for itself a secure position, second only to the forty-year-old Whitaker's Almanac of London, with which alone it can be compared."

In 1923, the name changed to its current name, The World Almanac and Book of Facts.

Calvin Coolidge's father read from The World Almanac when he swore his son into office. Since then, photos have shown that Presidents John F. Kennedy and Bill Clinton have also used The World Almanac as a resource.

In 1931 The New York World merged with the Scripps-owned Telegram to form the New York World-Telegram. The World-Telegram subsequently acquired the assets of The Sun in 1950, and officially became the New York World-Telegram and The Sun. Ownership of the Almanac passed to the Newspaper Enterprise Association (another Scripps-owned business) in 1966, when the World-Telegram merged with the New York Herald Tribune and the New York Journal-American.

During World War II, The World Almanac could boast that it was read by GIs all over the world: between 1944 and 1946, at the request of the U.S. Government, The World Almanac had special print runs of 100,000 to 150,000 copies for distribution to the armed forces. The editions released immediately after the war, such as the 1949 World Almanac, showed estimates of the global Jewish population previous to the war due to the lack of new estimates, though they were updated in the subsequent editions, but not before being used by Holocaust negationists to deny the genocide of Jews during World War II.

In late December 1984, the 1985 edition reached first place in the category of paperback Advice, How- To and Miscellaneous books, on the The New York Times Best-seller List, with more than 1,760,000 copies sold at the time.

The first version of the video game Where in the World is Carmen Sandiego?, published in 1985, included a copy of The World Almanac in the purchase.

From the 1968 to 1986 editions the Almanac bore the imprints of local newspapers (in New York, the Daily News for most of the time) in various markets while published by NEA. Thereafter it was branded with "World Almanac Books", initially as an imprint of Pharos Books, another Scripps-owned entity, until the sales noted below.

Over the decades The World Almanac has been featured in several Hollywood films. Fred MacMurray talks about it with Edward G. Robinson in Double Indemnity; Bette Davis screams about it in All About Eve; Audrey Hepburn and Gary Cooper flirt about it in Love in the Afternoon; it is featured in Miracle on 34th Street when a trial is held to see if Santa Claus really exists; Rosie Perez continually reads it in the film White Men Can't Jump; and Will Smith checks it for the exact time of sunset so he can set his digital watch in I Am Legend.

The World Almanac For Kids was published annually since 1995 until 2014.

In 1993 Scripps sold The World Almanac to K-III (now Rent Group). The World Almanac was sold to Ripplewood Holdings' WRC Media in 1999. Ripplewood bought Reader's Digest and the book was then produced by the World Almanac Education Group, which was owned by The Reader's Digest Association.

=== 21st century ===
The World Almanac was sold to Infobase in 2009. In 2018, The World Almanac published its 150-year anniversary edition. The World Almanac, together with the "World Almanac Books" imprint used since the closing years of Scripps ownership, was sold to Skyhorse Publishing in 2020.

As with other Skyhorse imprints it is distributed by Simon & Schuster.

== Editing and publishing ==
In the mid-1980s, The World Almanac was put together by a ten-member staff. Twenty percent of the book was rarely updated (for example, the text of the Constitution of the United States), fifty percent was updated at least to some extent each year, and thirty percent of the content was completely new each year.

Lists published in The World Almanac include:

- "Surprising Facts"
- "Number Ones"
- "Americans By the Numbers"
- "Milestone Birthdays"
- "Notable Quotes"
- "Offbeat News"
- "Historical Anniversaries"

== Editions in the public domain ==
- The World Almanac & Book of Facts. Newspaper Enterprise Association. 1901.
- The World Almanac and Encyclopedia. Press Publishing Company (The New York World). 1911.
