= Robert Currey =

British astrologer (b. 1955)

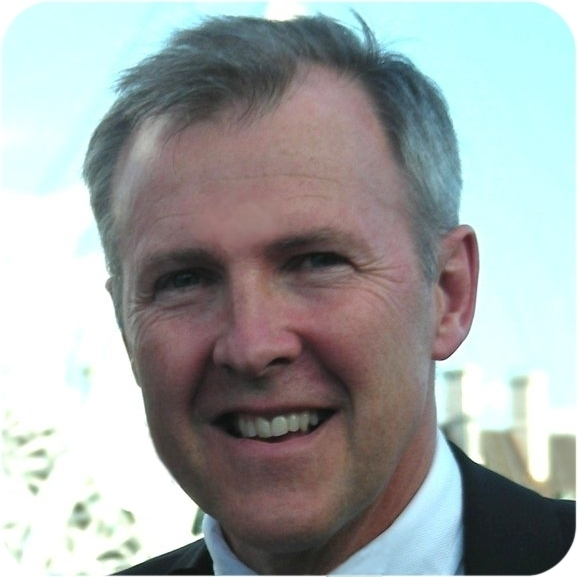
- Born: 24 September 1955; Dundee, Scotland
- Occupation: Astrologer
- Awards: Lifetime Achievement, Kolkata, India 2016; Charles Harvey award, Astrological Association of Great Britain 2017
- Website: www.equinoxastrology.com

Robert Currey (born 24 September 1955) is a British astrologer and entrepreneur.

== Career ==
In 1981 Currey founded the astrological company Equinox and in 1989 The Astrology Shop in Covent Garden, the first prime location store to be dedicated to astrology, which became a well-known London haunt for astrology enthusiasts. This gained an international reputation due to Currey's pioneering development of computerised astrological reports, and developed a global reach through subsequent outlets in the US and Australia. As an astrologer Currey specialises in astrocartography - a form of locational astrology in which he was certified by the technique's promoter, Jim Lewis.

In 2021, Currey became editor of Correlation, the Astrological Association of Great Britain's biannual Journal of Research into Astrology.

== Media ==
Currey has been consulted on and appeared in various televised documentaries which feature astrology. These include Strictly Supernatural for the Discovery Channel, The New Age for Channel 4, and Solar Empire for Discovery TV.

In 2016, he was awarded a Lifetime Achievement award at the 26th International Conference organized by the Institute of Vedic Culture and Krishnamurti Institute of Astrology, Kolkata, India. Currey won the Charles Harvey award for exceptional service to astrology from the Astrological Association of Great Britain in 2017.

== Contributions ==
- "Foreword" in Gibson, Clare (2001). The Ultimate Birthday Book: Revealing the Secrets of Each Day of the Year. New York: Barnes & Noble Books. ISBN 978-0-760-71102-6.
