= Robert Couteau =

American astrocartographer

Robert Couteau (born 1956 in Brooklyn, NY) is an American astrocartographer (practitioner of a particular form of locational astrology) best known for his theory of the Least-Aspected Planet (LAP) in astrocartography and astrology. Although the professional astrology community's response to the theory of the Least-Aspected Planet has been overwhelmingly positive, several astrologers have disagreed over methods of applying the theory in astrology and astrocartography.

== Least-Aspected Planet ==
The concept of the LAP, first advanced in 1998, proposes that the horoscope planet that receives the fewest astrological aspects is the keynote or focal point of the birth chart. In the analysis of planetary lines in astrocartography, the rising, setting, Imum coeli, and midheaven lines of the LAP represent geographic areas of greatest potential for the native. The theory was initially developed by analyzing accurately recorded horoscopes of historical personalities, and it has also been successfully applied, in mundane astrology, to the study of historical events.

The complete text of this research was made available as a free e-book in 1998, and many excerpts of it were later published in online and print journals over the next decade. The essay The Role of the Least-Aspected Planet in Astrocartography: New Insights Into the Spirit of Place, which introduced these ideas, was featured in Matrix Software's Learn Astrology archive (originally, Astro-Talk magazine) later that same year. In 2000, the Jim Lewis Slayden Foundation, devoted to the legacy of the founder of modern astrocartography, Jim Lewis, hosted an essay by Couteau titled The Least-Aspected Planet in Astro*Carto*Graphy: A Metaphor of the Soul, which discusses how the LAP symbolizes the “overall archetypal pattern” residing “at the very core of the chart” and cites Carl Jung as a primary influence. The University Centre for Astrological Research (C.U.R.A.) in Paris published two more essays on the subject: Couteau's An Introduction to Astrocartography (with an introduction in French by Patrice Guinard) and Beyond the Trigger Effect: A Personal Note on the ‘Numinous Consciousness.’ The latter work explores the writing of Rudolf Otto, the scholar of comparative religion who first coined the term numinous, and it attempts to link Otto's ideas on religious experience to traditional astrology and Least-Aspected Planets. This essay was later translated into Spanish by Gerry Hache and published in C.U.R.A. as Mas allá del efecto disparador. In 2002 the Finnish astrology magazine Astro Logos published Couteau's lengthy essay Transcendental Mercury as a two-part feature in its summer and fall print editions (translated as “Transsendenttinen Merkurius”). The essay describes the various ways that Mercury may manifest as either a Least- or Most-Aspected Planet in astrology and astrocartography. In 1999 Anima Mundi magazine hosted his essay “Transcendental Mars,” which explores the same dynamics in the Martian complex and lists various celebrity personalities with a Least-Aspected Mars whose life and work was epitomized by the symbolism and astrocartographic proximity of that planet. In 2004 excerpts from Couteau's work on Least- and Most-Aspected Pluto were published in the book The Astrology of Film: The Interface of Movies, Myth, and Archetype, by Bill Streett and Jeffrey Kishner.

In October 2006 The Mountain Astrologer featured a review of the complete text of The Role of the Least-Aspected Planet in Astrocartography. Planetary Symbolism in Astrocartography and Transcendental Astrology. Other print magazines that have featured Couteau's work on the subject include Astrolore: The Astrology Magazine, published in Poole, England, and the Celtic Astrologer: The Journal of the Dublin Astrological Centre. In 1999, in the summer and fall editions of Aspects magazine, astrologer Claudia Dikinis published a two-part article titled “Election 2000” that cited Couteau's statistical findings, namely that Least-Aspected Saturn appears with higher frequency than other horoscope planets in the birth charts of American presidents.
