= Astrolog =

Free astrology software

- Original author: Walter Pullen
- Initial release: September 10, 1991
- Stable release: 8.00 / May 31, 2026
- Written in: C++
- Type: Astrology
- License: GPL
- Website: http://www.astrolog.org/astrolog.htm
- Repository: github.com/CruiserOne/Astrolog

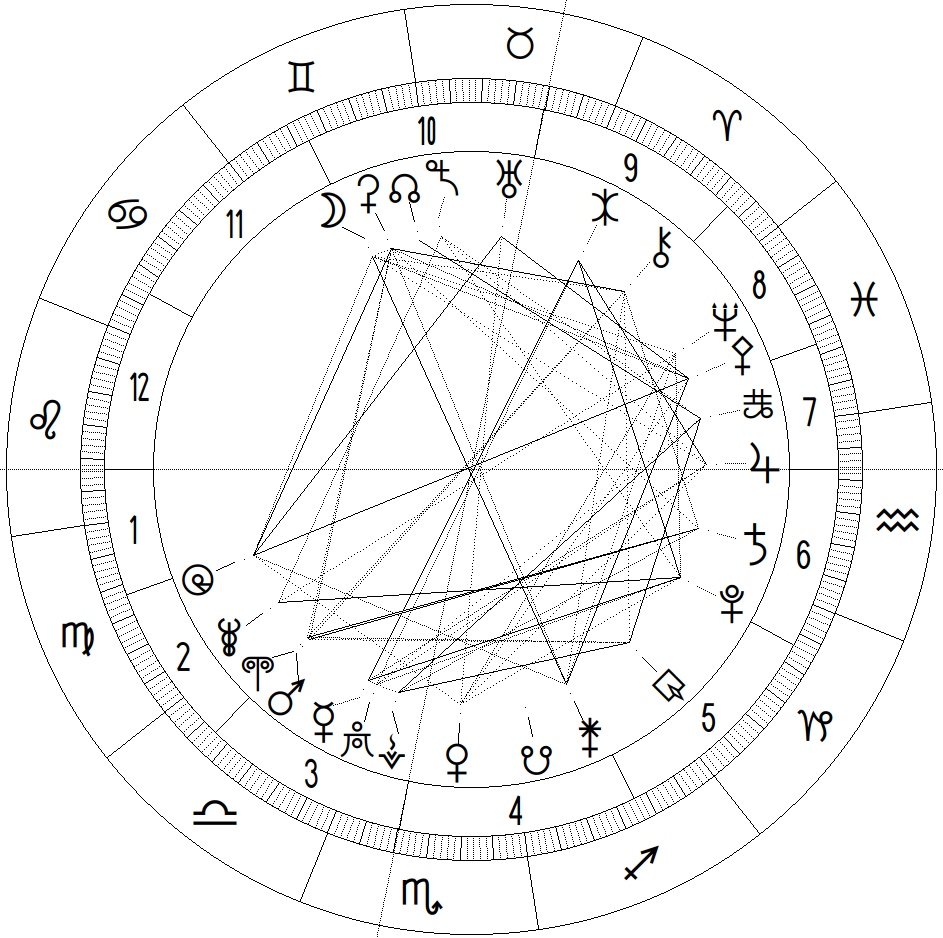
Astrolog wheel chart, monochrome, Astronomicon font. Shown in the inner ring, clockwise from the top, are: ☽ the Moon, ⚳ Ceres, ☊ ascending node, ⯲ Sedna, ♅ Uranus, ⯰ Eris, ⚷ Chiron, ♆ Neptune, ⚴ Pallas, 🝽 Gonggong, ♃ Jupiter, ♄ Saturn, ⯓ Pluto, 🝾 Quaoar, ⚵ Juno, ☋ descending node, ♀ Venus, ⚶ Vesta, 🝻 Haumea, ☿ Mercury, ♂ Mars, 🝼 Makemake, ⯚ Hygiea and 🝿 Orcus.

Astrolog is an open-source astrological software program that has been available online free of charge since 1991. It has been (as of 2026) authored by Walter Pullen since its creation, and was originally distributed via postings to the Usenet newsgroup alt.astrology.

Astrolog can create horoscopes, natal charts, and calculate current planetary positions in sidereal, traditional, and heliocentric formats. It can be used to relate astrological house and sign dispositors and other nonstandard systems. Astrolog uses 23 different house systems, can calculate 24 different aspects such as trines, squares, semisquares, and rarer ones such as biquintiles, quatronoviles, and sesquiquadrates. Astrolog computes the traditional planets, along with asteroids such as Ceres, Juno and Vesta, trans-Neptunian objects such as Eris, Haumea and Makemake, uranian objects such as Vulkanus and Russian Proserpina, and 27 different planetary moons. It can show nearly 50 fixed stars, display exoplanet transits, and animate the chart in real time synchronized with the OS clock. Astrolog can do forms of locational astrology such as astrocartography. Recent versions use the tz database for time zone and daylight saving time detection.

All versions of Astrolog have been distributed with source code, and the most recent versions are free software under the GNU General Public License. Several different parties have contributed to the core program or to alternate versions of it. For example, Astrolog started with the early astrological formulas implemented by Michael Erlewine. Later versions of it made use of the Placalc and then Swiss Ephemeris libraries produced by Astrodienst AG. Other parties contributed PostScript graphics, and integrated ephemeris files for minor planetary objects. Astrolog has been ported to many different platforms, where versions exist for Unix, MS-DOS, Microsoft Windows, Macintosh, OS/2, and Amiga, among others. Astrolog has also been distributed as sample packages with versions of SUSE Linux.

Some consider Astrolog to rival commercial programs in quality. In November 1995, The Mountain Astrologer reviewed a number of software programs, where Astrolog was the one freeware program included, described, as "good enough to be worthy of review with the main commercial programs". In the 1990s, Astrolog was mentioned a number of times in American Astrology's "The New Astrology" article by Ken Irving, because at the time it was the only readily available program that could compute Gauquelin sectors as described by astrologer Michel Gauquelin.

All versions of Astrolog include a command line interface. Most criticism of the program is due to command switches being confusing to memorize or use. Windows and Macintosh versions eventually included standard GUI. The command switch interface allows all of Astrolog's features to be accessed from shell scripts or to be invoked by other programs. There are a number of online servers that use Astrolog as a back end to generate charts for the user.
