= Fringe science =

Inquiries far outside of mainstream science

Fringe science refers to ideas whose attributes include being highly speculative or relying on premises already refuted. The chance of ideas rejected by editors and published outside the mainstream being correct is remote. When the general public does not distinguish between science and imitators, it risks exploitation, and in some cases, a "yearning to believe or a generalized suspicion of experts is a very potent incentive to accepting some pseudoscientific claims".

The term "fringe science" covers everything from novel hypotheses, which can be tested utilizing the scientific method, to wild ad hoc hypotheses and mumbo jumbo. This has resulted in a tendency to dismiss all fringe science as the domain of pseudoscientists, hobbyists, and quacks.

A concept that was once accepted by the mainstream scientific community may become fringe science because of a later evaluation of previous research. For example, focal infection theory, which held that focal infections of the tonsils or teeth are a primary cause of systemic disease, was once considered to be medical fact. It has since been dismissed because of a lack of evidence.

== Description ==
The boundary between fringe science and pseudoscience is disputed. Friedlander writes that there is no widespread understanding of what separates science from nonscience or pseudoscience. Pseudoscience, however, is something that is not scientific but is incorrectly characterised as science.

The term may be considered pejorative. For example, Lyell D. Henry Jr. wrote, "Fringe science [is] a term also suggesting kookiness."

Continental drift was rejected for decades as lacking conclusive evidence before plate tectonics was accepted.

The confusion between science and pseudoscience, between honest scientific error and genuine scientific discovery, is not new, and it is a permanent feature of the scientific landscape .... Acceptance of new science can come slowly.

== Examples ==
=== Historical ===
Some historical ideas that are considered to have been refuted by mainstream science are:

- Wilhelm Reich's work with orgone, a physical energy he claimed to have discovered, contributed to his alienation from the psychiatric community. He was eventually sentenced to two years in a federal prison, where he died. At that time and continuing today, scientists disputed his claim that he had scientific evidence for the existence of orgone. Nevertheless, amateurs and a few fringe researchers continued to believe that orgone is real.
- Focal infection theory (FIT), as the primary cause of systemic disease, rapidly became accepted by mainstream dentistry and medicine after World War I. This acceptance was largely based upon what later turned out to be fundamentally flawed studies. As a result, millions of people were subjected to needless dental extractions and surgeries. The original studies supporting FIT began falling out of favor in the 1930s. By the late 1950s, it was regarded as a fringe theory.
- The Clovis First theory held that the Clovis culture was the first culture in North America. It was long regarded as a mainstream theory until mounting evidence of a pre-Clovis culture discredited it.

=== Modern ===
Relatively recent fringe sciences include:

- Aubrey de Grey, featured in a 2006 60 Minutes special report, is studying human longevity. He calls his work "strategies for engineered negligible senescence" (SENS). Many mainstream scientists believe his research is fringe science (especially his view of the importance of nuclear epimutations and his timeline for antiaging therapeutics). In a 2005 article in Technology Review (part of a larger series), it was stated that "SENS is highly speculative. Many of its proposals have not been reproduced, nor could they be reproduced with today's scientific knowledge and technology. Echoing Myhrvold, we might charitably say that de Grey's proposals exist in a kind of antechamber of science, where they wait (possibly in vain) for independent verification. SENS does not compel the assent of many knowledgeable scientists; but neither is it demonstrably wrong."
- A nuclear fusion reaction called cold fusion, which occurs near room temperature and pressure, was reported by chemists Martin Fleischmann and Stanley Pons in March 1989. Numerous research efforts at the time were unable to replicate their results. Subsequently, several scientists have worked on cold fusion or have participated in international conferences on it. In 2004, the United States Department of Energy commissioned a panel on cold fusion to reexamine the concept. They wanted to determine whether their policies should be altered because of new evidence.
- The theory of abiogenic petroleum origin holds that petroleum was formed from deep carbon deposits, perhaps dating to the formation of the Earth. The ubiquity of hydrocarbons in the Solar System may be evidence that there may be more petroleum on Earth than commonly thought and that petroleum may originate from carbon-bearing fluids that migrate upward from the Earth's mantle. Abiogenic hypotheses saw a revival in the last half of the twentieth century by Russian and Ukrainian scientists. More interest was generated in the West after the 1992 publication by Thomas Gold of the journal article, "The Deep, Hot Biosphere". Gold's version of the theory is partly based on the existence of a biosphere composed of thermophile bacteria in the Earth's crust, which might explain the existence of specific biomarkers in extracted petroleum.
- Young Earth creationism, asserts the Universe is under 10,000 years old, with variations, such as Gap creationism, and Old Earth creationism, offering similar propositions.
- Modern flat Earth advocates assert that Samuel Rowbotham was correct, in his, 1849, pamphlet, and 1865 book, Zetetic Astronomy: The Earth not a Globe, to reject the Hellenistic (323 BCE–31 BCE) spherical earth model, for a flat disc world, centred on the North pole.
- Out of India theorem - asserts Indo-European languages evolved in India, and spread to Europe through waves of pre-historic Indian immigrants.

=== Accepted as mainstream ===
Some theories that were once rejected as fringe science but were eventually accepted as mainstream science include:

- Plate tectonics
- The existence of Troy
- Heliocentrism
- Norse colonization of the Americas
- The Big Bang theory
- Helicobacter pylori bacteria as the causative agent of peptic ulcer disease
- The germ theory of disease
- Neanderthal-Homo sapiens hybridization

== Responding to fringe science ==
Michael W. Friedlander has suggested some guidelines for responding to fringe science, which, he argues, is a more difficult problem than scientific misconduct. His suggested methods include impeccable accuracy, checking cited sources, not overstating orthodox science, thorough understanding of the Wegener continental drift example, examples of orthodox science investigating radical proposals, and prepared examples of errors from fringe scientists.

Friedlander suggests that fringe science is necessary so mainstream science will not atrophy. Scientists must evaluate the plausibility of each new fringe claim, and certain fringe discoveries "will later graduate into the ranks of accepted" — while others "will never receive confirmation".

Margaret Wertheim profiled many "outsider scientists" in her book Physics on the Fringe, who receive little or no attention from professional scientists. She describes all of them as trying to make sense of the world using the scientific method but in the face of being unable to understand modern science's complex theories. She also finds it fair that credentialed scientists do not bother spending a lot of time learning about and explaining problems with the fringe theories of uncredentialed scientists since the authors of those theories have not taken the time to understand the mainstream theories they aim to disprove.

=== Controversies ===
As Donald E. Simanek asserts, "Too often speculative and tentative hypotheses of cutting edge science are treated as if they were scientific truths, and so accepted by a public eager for answers." However, the public is ignorant that "As science progresses from ignorance to understanding it must pass through a transitional phase of confusion and uncertainty."

The media also play a role in propagating the belief that certain fields of science are controversial. In their 2003 paper "Optimising Public Understanding of Science and Technology in Europe: A Comparative Perspective", Jan Nolin et al. write that "From a media perspective it is evident that controversial science sells, not only because of its dramatic value, but also since it is often connected to high-stake societal issues."

== See also ==
- Cargo cult science
- Epistemology
- Fringe theory
- Homeopathy
- Journal of Scientific Exploration
- Junk science
- List of topics characterized as pseudoscience
- Paradigm shift
- Pathological science
- Science, technology and society (STS)
- Scientific misconduct
- Sociology of scientific knowledge (SSK)
- Superseded scientific theories
- Transhumanism
- Voodoo science

Books

- 13 Things That Don't Make Sense (a book by Michael Brooks)
- The Structure of Scientific Revolutions (a book by Thomas S. Kuhn)

== Bibliography ==
- Ben-Yehuda, Nachman (1990). The politics and morality of deviance: moral panics, drug abuse, deviant science, and reversed stigmatization. SUNY series in deviance and social control. Albany: State University of New York Press. OCLC 19128625.
- Brante, Thomas; Fuller, Steve; Lynch, William (1993). Controversial science: from content to contention. Albany, New York: State University of New York Press. OCLC 26096166.
- Brooks, M. (2008). 13 Things That Don't Make Sense. New York: Doubleday. OCLC 213480209.
  - —— (31 March 2009). "Why science doesn't make sense". The Daily Telegraph. Archived from the original on 4 April 2009.
- Brown, George E. Jr. (23 October 1996). Environmental science under siege: fringe science and the 104th Congress. Washington, D.C.: Democratic Caucus of the Committee on Science, U.S. House of Representatives. OCLC 57343997.
- Cooke, R. M. (1991). Experts in uncertainty: opinion and subjective probability in science. New York: Oxford University Press. ISBN 0-19-506465-8. OCLC 22710786.
- CSICOP On-line: Scientifically Investigating Paranormal and Fringe Science Claims Archived 2014-03-16 at the Wayback Machine—Committee for Skeptical Inquiry
- de Jager, Cornelis (March 1990). "Science, fringe science and pseudo-science". Quarterly Journal of the Royal Astronomical Society. 31 (1): 31–45. Bibcode:1990QJRAS..31...31D. ISSN 0035-8738.
- Dutch, Steven I. (January 1982). "Notes on the nature of fringe science". Journal of Geological Education. 30 (1): 6–13. Bibcode:1982JGeoE..30....6D. doi:10.5408/0022-1368-30.1.6. ISSN 0022-1368. OCLC 92686827.
- Frazier, Kendrick (1981). Paranormal borderlands of science. Buffalo, New York: Prometheus Books. ISBN 0-87975-148-7. OCLC 251487947.
- Friedlander, Michael W. (February 1995). At the Fringes of Science. Boulder, Colorado: Westview Press. ISBN 0-8133-2200-6. OCLC 31046052.
- Friedman, Sharon M; Dunwoody, Sharon; Rogers, Carol L, eds. (1998). Communicating uncertainty: Media coverage of new and controversial science. Mahwah, New Jersey; London: Lawrence Erlbaum. ISBN 0-8058-2727-7. OCLC 263560777.
- Mauskopf, SH (1979). The reception of unconventional science. Boulder, Colorado: Westview Press. ISBN 0-89158-297-5. OCLC 4495634.
- Mousseau, Marie-Catherine (2003). "Parapsychology: Science or Pseudo-Science?" (PDF). Journal of Scientific Exploration. 17 (2): 271–282. ISSN 0892-3310. Archived from the original (PDF) on 27 November 2009.
- Truzzi, Marcello (1998). "The Perspective of Anomalistics". Anomalistics. Center for Scientific Anomalies Research. Archived from the original on 6 February 2009.
