= Slayden =

Slayden may refer to:

- Slayden, Mississippi
- Slayden, Tennessee
- James Luther Slayden (1853–1924), American politician
- Jim Lewis Slayden (1941-1995), American astrologer
