= Planetary objects proposed in religion, astrology, ufology and pseudoscience =

Non-scientific hypothetical objects

There are a number of planetary objects proposed in religion, astrology, ufology and pseudoscience whose existence is not supported by scientific evidence.

== Kolob ==
Kolob is a star or planet described in the Book of Abraham, a sacred text in many traditions of the Latter Day Saint movement. Kolob is also mentioned in a Latter-day Saint hymn. The Book of Abraham refers to Kolob as a "star", however, it also refers to several planets as stars, and Kolob is commonly viewed as a planet by Latter Day Saints today.

Kolob is described as the heavenly body closest to the throne of God. Joseph Smith also claimed it "signified" the first creation.

== Lilith ==
Lilith is a fictitious invisible moon of Earth, supposedly about the same mass as the Earth's Moon, proposed in 1918 by astrologer Walter Gorn Old, who called himself Sepharial. Sepharial applied the name Lilith from medieval Jewish legend, where she is described as the first wife of Adam. Sepharial claimed that Lilith was the same second moon that scientist Georg Waltemath claimed to have discovered twenty years earlier, but which had never been confirmed. Sepharial also claimed to be the first person in history to observe Waltemath's moon as it crossed the Sun, and rationalized that it was too dark to be otherwise visually detected.

Sepharial's comments ignored the fact that Waltemath's proposed moon had already been discredited by the scientific community at the turn of the century.

There are many readily apparent holes in the arguments supporting Lilith's existence, and its existence is believed only by fringe groups; astrologers now generally use the name for the position of the actual Moon's apogee.

=== In modern astrology ===
In present-day astrology, the name Lilith or Black Moon Lilith is usually given to a point on the horoscope of the actual Moon's apogee (farthest point in orbit from Earth). When considered as a point, this Lilith is sometimes defined as the second focus of the ellipse described by the Moon's orbit; the Earth is the first focus, and the apogee lies in the same approximate direction as the focus. It takes 8 years and 10 months for this point to complete a circuit through the zodiac tracking the apsidal precession.

== Planets proposed by L. Ron Hubbard ==
L. Ron Hubbard, the founder of Scientology, proposed as part of his cosmology a Galactic Confederacy which consisted of 26 stars and 76 planets including Earth, which was then known as "Teegeeack". One planet in the Scientology doctrine is known as Helatrobus.

== Ummo ==
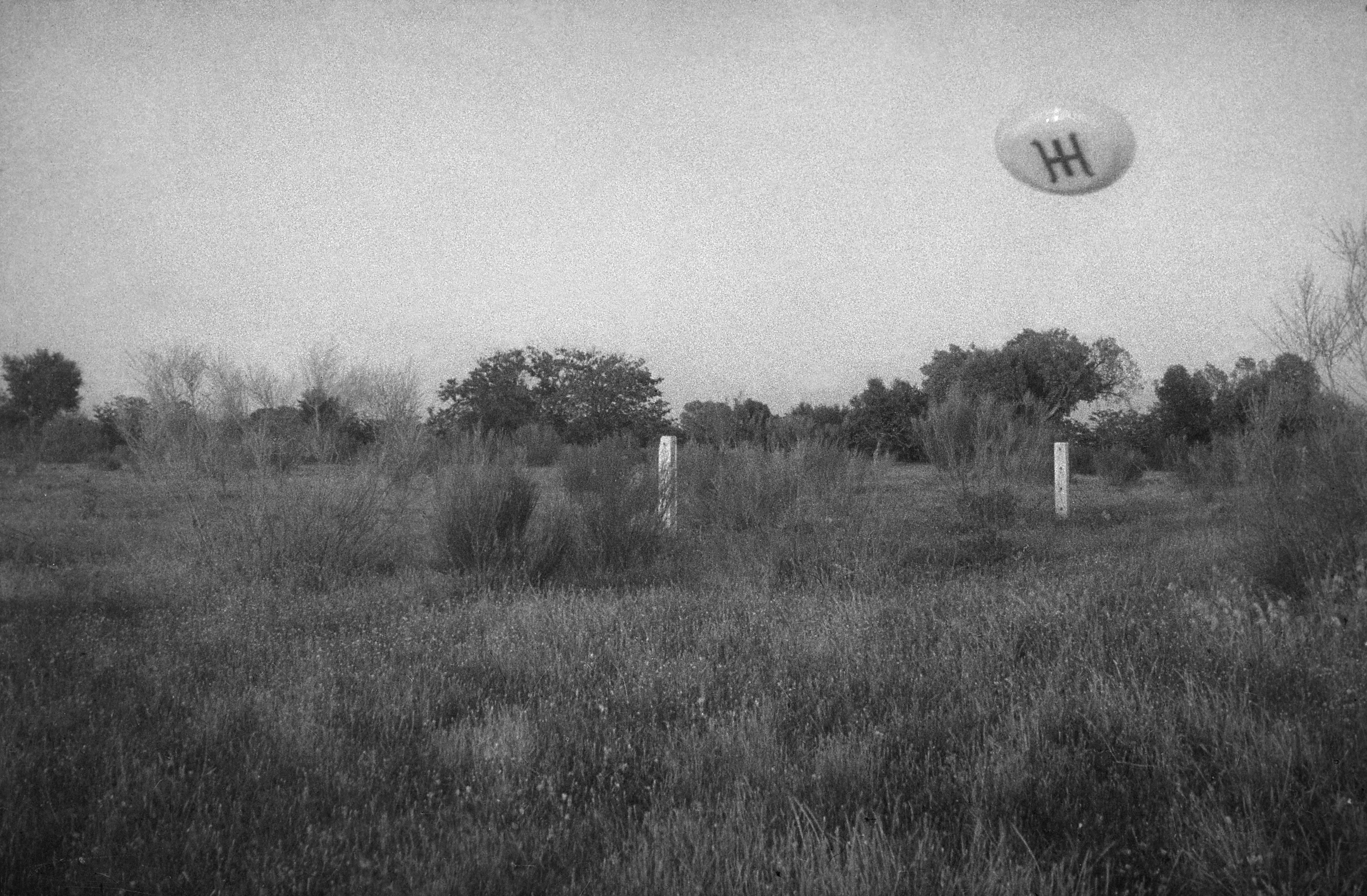
A supposed Ummo ship over San José de Valderas, Alcorcón, Spain on 1 June 1967.

Ummo ([ˈumo]) is a hypothetical planet believed to be located in the constellation Virgo. Ummo and its civilization are described in a decades-long series of claims that aliens from the planet Ummo were communicating with people on the Earth. Most Ummo information was in the form of detailed documents and letters sent to various esoteric groups or UFO enthusiasts. The Ummo affair was subject to much mainstream attention in France and Spain during the 1960s and a degree of interest remains regarding the subject. Ummoism is the term used to define different groups interested in the study of the ideas and concepts presented in the Ummo letters). The culprit (or culprits) is unknown, but José Luis Jordán Peña has claimed responsibility for writing the letters and instigating Ummoism, leading many to think that Ummo could be an elaborate hoax. However, twenty years ago, there were still a few small groups of devotees, such as "a strange Bolivian cult called the Daughters of Ummo".

Jacques Vallée has said that the author(s) of the Ummo documents might be a real-world analogue of the fictional creators of Borges' "Tlön, Uqbar, Orbis Tertius". Historian Mike Dash writes that Ummoism began on 6 February 1966, in Madrid. On that day, Jordán Peña claimed to have had a close encounter of the first kind when he saw "an enormous circular object with three legs and, on its underside, a curious symbol: three vertical lines joined by a horizontal bar. The two exterior lines curved outward at the edges, which made the pictogram resemble the alchemical sign for the planet Uranus." (Dash, 299) Peña's report generated a fair amount of excitement, but it was only the beginning. Not long afterwards, a Madrid author of a UFO book received several photographs in an anonymous mailing. The photos were of a craft similar to the one reported by Peña, and bearing the same symbol. Within a few weeks, "a leading Spanish contactee named Fernando Sesma Manzano became involved when he began receiving lengthy, typewritten documents which purported to come from a spacefaring race called the Ummites." (Dash, 299)

Since 1991, the well known French researcher Jean-Pierre Petit has claimed to have detected signs of superior intelligence in some of the Ummite writings he says he has received. He also claims that the scientific subjects addressed in the Ummite letters are totally innovative and have directly inspired him in his research in cosmology and magnetohydrodynamics.

On the basis of letters, it is difficult to speak of an Ummite language. All we have, apart from a few complete sentences, is a lexicon, a set of vocables, the vast majority of which are given to us in isolation. Antonio Ribera mentions 403 Ummite words in a 1978 compilation and Jean Pollion, in Ummo, de vrais extraterrestres (2002), lists over a thousand words considering that every doubling of a letter in a word is significant.

Two theories have been formulated by analysts of Ummite letters:

- the first, defended by Jean Pollion pseudonyme, considers that each letter (sound or phoneme) in words transcribed in typewritten form is signifying, and he has called these sounds "soncepts". He considers this to be an "ideophonemic" language:
  "By analogy with ideographic languages, which proceed by assembling ideas corresponding to written and pronounceable signs, I have chosen to attribute to this language the "ideophonemic" character. To date, I have counted 17 "soncepts" by associative combinations of these phonemes, almost all of which are relational."
- The second considers that differences in spelling (especially the doubling of letters) are of little significance, and that they are due to differences in the understanding of foreign sounds by the typist(s), or to difficulties in alphabetic transcription. They consider that language is made up of word-objects and not of "soncepts."

Currently, more than 1300 pages of those letters have been registered, but it is possible that many other letters exist. In a 1988 letter, reference is made to the existence of 3850 pages, copies of which have been sent to several individuals, representing perhaps up to 160,000 pages of total Ummo documents. The true identity of the authors of those reports remains unknown.

Dash notes that "few ufologists outside Spain took Ummoism seriously—the photographic evidence was highly suspect, and, while the Ummite letters were more sophisticated than most contactee communication, there was nothing in them that could not have originated on Earth." Still, Dash allows that, whatever their origins, "considerable effort had gone into the supposed hoax." (Dash, 299)

Many scientific subjects are described in detail in the letters, including network theory (or graph theory), astrophysics, cosmology, the unified field theory, biology, and evolution. Some of this information is thought to be dubious pseudoscience, but much of it is scientifically accurate. However, Jerome Clark (Clark, 1993) notes that Jacques Vallée argued that the scientific content of the Ummo letters was knowledgeable but unremarkable, and compared the scientific references to a well-researched science fiction novel—plausible in the 1960s, but dated by the standards of the 1990s.

The controversy over an "error" in the distance from Wolf 424 arose from the first letter, referenced D21 (May 1966), which states: "The first distance is the one used by terrestrial astronomers for their calculations (disdaining the curvatures of light as it passes through fields of high gravitational intensity), such a distance is "constant" for two bodies fixed in space. The second distance is a function of time, measured in an N-dimensional space with a certain periodicity. Its measurement is very important as it relates to our galactic travels. DISTANCE FROM IUMMA TO THE SUN. The apparent distance, i.e. that which a coherent beam of waves would follow in three-dimensional space, on 4 January 1955, was 14.437 light-years. The real distance (straight distance in decadimensional space) on the same date, according to our measurements, was 3.685 light-years". Further on, after giving some characteristics, the author adds "The result is that it is impossible, even with the most careful axis translation, to identify the same star coded by us with another catalogued by Earth astronomers. We believe, however, that our IUMMA may still be the star you've registered as WOLF 424, as its coordinates are similar to those we've given you."

Thus, ill-informed or ill-intentioned critics have amputated the original writings, arguing that the author of the letters relied on an erroneous measurement, this distance coinciding with that measured by Yerkes' laboratory in 1938 (3.6 to 3.8 al) for Wolf 424, although Yerkes corrected it in 1952.

== Planets proposed by Zecharia Sitchin ==
The work of Zecharia Sitchin has garnered much attention among ufologists, ancient astronaut theorists and conspiracy theorists. He claimed to have uncovered, through his retranslations of Sumerian texts, evidence that the human race was visited/created by a group of extraterrestrials from a distant planet in the Solar System. Part of his theory lay in an astronomical interpretation of the Babylonian creation myth, the Enuma Elish, in which he replaced the names of gods with hypothetical planets. However, since the principal evidence for Sitchin's claims lay in his own personally derived etymologies and not on any scholarly agreed interpretations, academics consider it pseudoscience and pseudohistory, if they know it at all.

Sitchin's theory proposes the planets Tiamat and Nibiru. Tiamat supposedly existed between Mars and Jupiter. The planet's orbit was disrupted by the arrival of a large planet or very small star (less than twenty times the size of Jupiter) which passed through the planetary system between 65 million and four billion years ago. The new orbits caused Tiamat to collide with one of the moons of Nibiru. The debris from this collision are thought by the theory's proponents to have variously formed the asteroid belt and the current form of planet Earth.

Sitchin claims that the Babylonians associated Nibiru with the god Marduk; the word is Akkadian and the meaning is uncertain. Sitchin hypothesized it as a planet in a highly elliptic orbit around the Sun, with a perihelion passage some 3,600 years ago and assumed orbital period of about 3,450 years; he also claimed it was the home of a technologically advanced human-like alien race, the Anunnaki, who apparently visited Earth in search of gold. These beings eventually created humanity by genetically crossing themselves with extant primates, and thus became the first gods.

Beginning in 1995, websites such as ZetaTalk have claimed that Nibiru or "Planet X" is a brown dwarf currently within our planetary system, soon to pass relatively close to Earth. Sitchin disagreed it is a star, with the timing and parameters of passage.

Sitchin also postulated that Pluto began life as Gaga, a satellite of Saturn which, due to perturbation caused by Nibiru's passing, was flung into orbit beyond Neptune.

== Serpo ==
Project Serpo is an alleged top-secret exchange program between the United States government and an alien planet called Serpo in the Zeta Reticuli star system. Details of the alleged exchange program have appeared in several UFO conspiracy stories, including one incident in 1983—in which a man identifying himself as United States Air Force Sergeant Richard C. Doty contacted investigative journalist Linda Moulton Howe claiming to be able to supply her Air Force records of the exchange for her HBO documentary The ET Factor, only to pull out without providing any evidence to substantiate his story—and one incident in 2005 when a series of emails were sent to a UFO discussion group run by Victor Martinez claiming that the project was real. Some variations on the conspiracy story state that the name Serpo is the nickname of the extrasolar planet. Other versions state that it is a mispronunciation of either Serponia or Seinu by authorities involved in the project.

The first mention of a 'Project Serpo' was in a UFO email list maintained by enthusiast Victor Martinez. Various versions of the conspiracy theory circulated and were later detailed on a website. According to the most common version of the story, an alien survived a crash near Roswell in the later 1940s (see Roswell UFO incident). This alien was detained but treated well by American military forces, contacted its home planet and eventually repatriated. The story continues by claiming that this led to the establishment of some sort of relationship between the American government and the people of its home world, said to be a planet of the binary star system Zeta Reticuli.

Zeta Reticuli has a history in ufology (including the Betty and Barney Hill abduction and the Bob Lazar story), having been claimed as the home system of an alien race called the Greys.

The story finally claims that twelve American military personnel visited the planet between 1965 and 1978 and that all of the party have since died, from "after effects of high radiation levels from the two suns". Another version of the story claims that "Eight (8) Team Members returned on the seven (7) month trek home. Team Member #308 (Team Pilot #2) died of a pulmonary embolism en route to SERPO on the 9-month journey; 11 arrived safely. One (1) died on the planet—and both of their bodies were returned to Earth—while two (2) others decided to remain on the ALIEN homeworld of SERPO."

One criticism of Project Serpo stems from the lack of veracity of one of its alleged witnesses, Sergeant Richard Doty. Doty has been involved in other alleged UFO-related activities (see Majestic 12 and Paul Bennewitz), and thus is a discredited source (or a purposeful provider of disinformation). Additionally, there is no physical evidence supporting the project's existence. According to Tim Swartz of Mysteries Magazine, Doty, who promised evidence to Moulton Howe before backing out, has been involved in circulating several other UFO conspiracy stories. Swartz also expressed that the details of Project Serpo have varied considerably with different accounts. It has been alleged that the entire series of posts were designed to be viral marketing for a new book by Doty.

Bill Ryan, a chief proponent of publicizing the Project Serpo claims, announced on 5 March 2007 that he was stepping down from his role as webmaster for the Serpo material. Ryan nevertheless maintains his belief that an extraterrestrial exchange program did occur, although he states that the Serpo releases definitely contained disinformation.

It has been noted that the Project Serpo story has similarity to scenes in the 1977 blockbuster Close Encounters of the Third Kind, where a team of humans prepare to board the alien ship.

== See also ==
- Fictional planets of the Solar System
- Lost asteroids
- Nibiru cataclysm
- Planets in astrology
- Religious cosmology
- Stars proposed in religion
- UFO conspiracy theory
