= Science Party =

Science Party may refer to:

- Science Party (Australia), a political party in Australia
- Science Party (UK), a political party in the United Kingdom
