= Charubel =

Welsh mystic

John Thomas (1826–1908) was a Welsh mystic and astrologist of the late 19th century. He used the professional name Charubel to practice, claiming to be an clairvoyant, occultist and herbalist. He was the co-author of the 1898 handbook Degrees of the Zodiac Symbolised.

== Early years ==
John Thomas was born in 1826 in Wales. As a young man, he studied for the Christian ministry, but ultimately followed occult and psychic interests. He was a curative mesmerist and claimed he had second sight and the ability to see Submundanes or Elementals, which he described as terrifying figures.

== Writings ==
Thomas founded a short-lived organisation called The Celestial Brotherhood which was also known as the British and Foreign Society of Occultists, first mentioned in 1884. Members included John Yarker and Major Francis George Irwin, keen observers of the occult.

Adopting the pseudonym "Charubel", he published numerous books and was editor of several esoteric periodicals. He published a monthly magazine initially called The Seer and Celestial Reformer but soon renamed The Occultist.

Thomas first met the astrologer Alan Leo in person in 1889. The Symbols of the Degrees of the Zodiac was first published as a series of articles in Leo's Astrologer's Magazine over a three-year period starting in December 1890.

Thomas's book, Degrees of the Zodiac Symbolised was first published in 1898. A subsequent edition of 1907 included separate material written by the much younger mystic and astrologer Sepharial (Dr. Walter Gorn Old).

In 1906, Thomas published The Psychology of Botany, Minerals and Precious Stones.

== Personal life and death ==
Thomas became very ill in 1891. Penniless, he relied on the care of others and was visited by occultists who travelled from all over the world to study with him. He died in 1908 in Manchester.

== Legacy ==
The National Library of Wales holds a collection of papers relating to Thomas.
