= Don Neroman =

French astrologer

Don Néroman (sometimes spelled Dom Néroman, pen-name of Pierre Rougié) was an astrologer born June 18, 1884, in Gramat, Lot department, France, and died in 1953.

Néroman was a proponent of eliminating superstitions from astrology and developing its scientific components. In 1943 he wrote Traité d'astrologie rationelle (1943) and Grandeur et pitié d'astrologie (1940). Néroman founded the Collège astrologique de France in Paris, which published its own journal from 1936 to 1955, the Bulletin du Collège astrologique de France.

Among the more distinctive aspects of his work was his study of the Lunar Apogee. Néroman also developed astrogeography techniques that were later developed and popularized by American astrologer Jim Lewis as astrocartography.
