= Georg Waltemath =

German astronomer

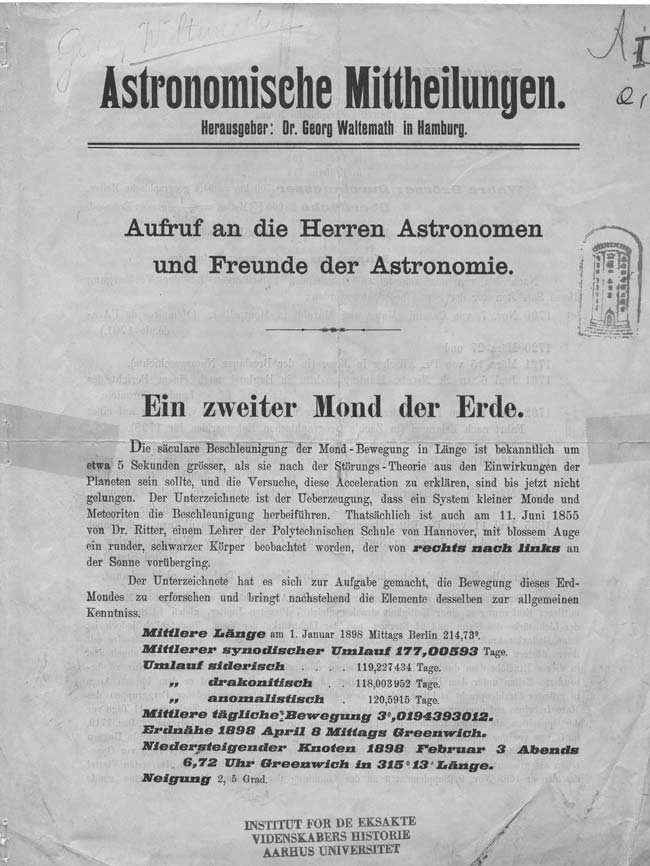
Poster announcing his discovery of the second moon of Earth.

Dr. Georg Wilhelm Waltemath (August 24, 1840 – September 27, 1915) was an astronomer from Hamburg, best known for his 1898 claim of a second moon of Earth as well as a system of tiny moons. It is widely held to be false.

== Second Moon ==
He is believed to have begun his search for one of the largest satellites which he claimed to exist based on the hypothesis that something was gravitationally affecting the Moon's orbit. He gave detailed information into it which is given below:

- Distance from earth: 1030000 km (640000 miles)
- Diameter: 700 km (430 miles)
- Orbital period: 119 days
- Synodic period: 177 days

He claimed that it was not normally visible with the naked eye but predicted it would be visible between 2 and 4 February 1898. Twelve claims were made to have seen it at that time but were later proven fraudulent or mistaken by astronomers W. Winkler and Baron Ivo von Benko who had been monitoring the area at the time. Waltemath also claimed that the moon had been sighted previously by Adolphus Greely in Greenland on 24 October 1881 and by painter and personal friend, C. Waller in Munich on 16 February 1897.

=== Third Moon ===
He later made claims of another Third Moon which he dubbed wahrhafter Wetter- und Magnet-Mond ("real weather and magnet moon"). According to a mention in the science journal Science it is 427250 km (265480 miles) away from earth, closer than Waltemath's previous moon, and 746 km (464 miles) in diameter. As Waltemath's claim of the second moon was generally considered to be false, reactions to the third were mostly scoffed at; that same article in Science considered that "Perhaps it is also the moon presiding over lunacy".

=== Similar claims ===
In 1918, astrologer Walter Gornold, also known as Sepharial, claimed to have confirmed the existence of Waltemath's moon. He named it Lilith. Sepharial claimed that Lilith was a 'dark' moon invisible for most of the time, but he claimed to have viewed it as it crossed the sun. Lilith is still used by some astrologers in their horoscopes. Sepharial took the name Lilith from the medieval Jewish legend, where she is described as the first wife of Adam.

== See also ==
- Planetary objects proposed in religion, astrology, ufology and pseudoscience
- Claimed moons of Earth
- Frédéric Petit (astronomer)
- Jules Verne
- Clyde Tombaugh
