= Martin Jay Davis =

American astrologer and fencer (1937–2022)

Personal information
- Born: September 7, 1937 St. Louis, Missouri, U.S.
- Died: January 10, 2022 (aged 84) Zeeland, Netherlands

Sport
- Country: United States
- Sport: Fencing
- Event: Foil
- College team: New York University

Achievements and titles
- Olympic finals: 1972

Martin Jay Davis (September 7, 1937 – January 10, 2022) was an American astrologer and author specializing in locational astrology. He was also a member of the United States fencing team (foil), and competed at the 1972 Olympic Games in Munich, Germany.

Davis was born in St. Louis, Missouri, and was Jewish. He attended New York University, fenced for the school, and was an NCAA Second Team All-American in 1958. He graduated in 1959 with an engineering degree.

He was a gold medalist in Individual Foil at the 1965 Maccabiah Games in Tel Aviv, Israel. At the 1963 Pan American Games in São Paulo, Brazil he won a gold medal with the US fencing team (foil). His first title, Astrolocality Astrology, won the Spica award for the best astrology book in 2000.

In 2017, he was inducted into the NYU Hall of Fame.

Davis died in Zeeland in the Netherlands, on January 10, 2022, at the age of 84.

== Publications ==
- Astrolocality Astrology (2000) Wessex Astrologer, Dorset, UK. ISBN 978-1902405056
- From Here to There: An Astrologer's Guide to Astromapping (2007) Wessex Astrologer, Dorset, UK. ISBN 978-1902405278
