= Sepharial =

British writer and astrologer

Walter Gorn Old (20 March 1864 in Handsworth, England – 23 December 1929 in Hove, England) was a 19th-century astrologer, who used the pen name "Sepharial", after an angel in the apocryphal Book of Enoch.

An English Theosophist, Sepharial was an astrologer in the late 19th and early 20th centuries and wrote multiple books, some of which are still highly regarded in some circles today. He was editor of Old Moore's Almanac, which is still published in the 21st century.

== Overview ==
As a young man, Sepharial initially studied medicine and followed this up with studies in psychology, Asian languages, astrology and numerology. In 1886, he started to write an astrology problem page in the Society Times where he answered public questions, and in 1887 was admitted to the "inner sanctum" of the Theosophical Society. He was one of the founding members of the Theosophical movement in England. Madame Blavatsky (whom he lived with until her death) called him "The Astral Tramp".

== Legacy ==
Sepharial became an influential author in the fields of the occult, astrology and numerology, and his writings had a considerable impact on Alfred H. Barley and Alan Leo, who he introduced to Theosophy. He can be credited as the first astrologer to use Georg Waltemath earth's hypothetical natural satellite in his calculations. Since he considered it to be black enough to be invisible most of the time he call it "dark moon" Lilith. A number of his books and other works were put together in a rather slapdash way, which made his reputation less enduring than it might have been. Sepharial also started a number of astrological magazines, all of which failed to establish themselves.

== Books ==
Sepharial wrote multiple books, most of which are rare and out of print, including the following:

- Sepharial: New Dictionary of Astrology, republished by Arco, New York in 1964.
- Sepharial: The New Manual of Astrology (in four books).
- Sepharial: Astrology Explained, republished by www.astrologyinaction.com in 2012.
- Sepharial: The Book of the Simple Way Pub 1904. (Translation of Lao Tzu's Chinese classic, the "Tao Te Ching").
- Sepharial: The Kabala of Numbers Pub 1911. Modern edition: ISBN 1-59605-404-2. (on numerology).
- Sepharial: Second Sight: A Study of Natural and Induced Clairvoyance, William Rider & Son: London, 1911
- Sepharial: Kabala: Ancient Secrets Of Numerology ISBN 81-222-0126-1
- Sepharial: The Silver Key.
- Sepharial: Cosmic Symbolism, 1912
- Sepharial: Eclipses: Astronomically and Astrologically Considered and Explained.
- Sepharial: Science of Foreknowledge.
- Sepharial and Charubel: Degrees of the Zodiac Symbolised (on astrology).
- Sepharial: A Manual of Occultism.
- Sepharial: Astrology: How To Make Your Own Horoscope, R. F. Fenno & Company, New York (N.D.) 126 pages w/ illustrations, 1920
- Sepharial: The Arcana Or Stock And Share Key, kessinger publishing 48 ISBN 0-7661-9326-8 (On Financial Astrology)
- Sepharial: The Law of Values: An Exposition of the Primary Causes of Stock and Share Fluctuations, cosimo classics 56 Pages ISBN 1-60206-108-4 (On Financial Astrology)
- Sepharial: The Theory of Geodetic Equivalents, David McKay, Philadelphia
- Sepharial: How to Read the Crystal or Crystal and Seer, 1922
