= 13 Things That Don't Make Sense =

2008 book by Michael Brooks

- Front cover art of U.S. edition
- Author: Michael Brooks
- Subject: Science, especially physics
- Publisher: Profile Books; Doubleday
- Publication date: 2008
- Publication place: United Kingdom; United States
- Media type: Print (hardcover)
- Pages: 240 pp
- ISBN: 9781861978172
- OCLC: 488437360
- Dewey Decimal: 500
- LC Class: Q173 .B893 2008

13 Things That Don't Make Sense is a non-fiction book by the British writer Michael Brooks, published in both the UK and the US during 2008.

The British subtitle is "The Most Intriguing Scientific Mysteries of Our Time" while the American is "The Most Baffling..." (see image).

Based on an article Brooks wrote for New Scientist in March 2005, the book, aimed at the general reader rather than the science community, contains discussion and description of a number of unresolved issues in science. It is a literary effort to discuss some of the inexplicable anomalies that after centuries science still cannot completely comprehend.

== Chapter 1 ==
The Missing Universe. This chapter deals with astronomy and theoretical physics and the ultimate fate of the universe, in particular the search for understanding of dark matter and dark energy and includes discussion of:

- The work of astronomers Vesto Slipher and then Edwin Hubble in demonstrating the universe is expanding;
- Vera Rubin's investigation of galaxy rotation curves that suggest something other than gravity is preventing galaxies from spinning apart, which led to the revival of unobserved "dark matter" theory;
- Experimental efforts to discover dark matter, including the search for the hypothetical neutralino and other weakly interacting massive particles);
- The study of supernovae at Lawrence Berkeley National Laboratory and Harvard University (under Robert Kirshner) that point to an accelerating universe powered by "dark energy" possibly vacuum energy;
- The assertion that the proposed modified Newtonian dynamics hypothesis and the accelerating universe disproves the dark matter theory.

== Chapter 2 ==
The Pioneer Anomaly. This discusses the Pioneer 10 and Pioneer 11 space probes, which appear to be veering off course and drifting towards the sun. At the time of writing of the book there was a growing speculation as to whether this phenomenon could be explained by a yet-undetermined fault in the rockets' systems or whether this was an unidentified effect of gravity. The lead investigator into the progress of the rockets is physicist Slava Turyshev of the NASA Jet Propulsion Laboratory in California who is analysing the data of the rockets' launch and progress and "reflying" the missions as computer simulations to try to find a solution to the mystery.

However, in 2012, after the book was published, Turyshev was able to give an explanation to the Pioneer Anomaly.

== Chapter 3 ==
Varying Constants. This chapter discusses the reliability of some physical constants, quantities or values that are held to be always fixed. One of these, the fine-structure constant, which calculates the behaviour and amount of energy transmitted in subatomic interactions from light reflection and refraction to nuclear fusion, has been called into question by physicist John Webb of the University of New South Wales who may have identified differences in the behaviour of light from quasars and light sources today. According to Webb's observations quasar light appears to refract different shades of colour from light waves emitted today. Brooks also discusses the Oklo natural nuclear fission reactor, in which the natural conditions in caves in Gabon 2 billion years ago caused the uranium there to react. It may be that the amount of energy released was different from today. Both sets of data are subject to ongoing investigation and debate but, Brooks suggests, may indicate that the behaviour of matter and energy can vary radically and essentially as the conditions of the universe changes through time.

== Chapter 4 ==
Cold Fusion. A review of efforts to create nuclear energy at room temperature using hydrogen that is embedded in a metal crystal lattice. Theoretically, this should not happen, because nuclear fusion requires a huge activation energy to get it started. The effect was first reported by chemists Martin Fleischmann and Stanley Pons in 1989, but attempts to reproduce it over the ensuing months were mostly unsuccessful. Cold fusion research was discredited, and articles on the subject became difficult to publish. But according to the book, a scattering of scientists around the world continue to report positive results, with multiple, independent verifications.

== Chapter 5 ==
Life. This chapter describes efforts to define life and how it emerged from inanimate matter (abiogenesis) and even recreate artificial life including: the Miller–Urey experiment by chemists Stanley Miller and Harold Urey at the University of Chicago in 1953 to spark life into a mixture of chemicals by using an electrical charge; Steen Rasmussen's work at the Los Alamos National Laboratory to implant primitive DNA, peptide nucleic acid, into soap molecules and heat them up; and the work of the Institute for Complex Adaptive Matter at the University of California.

== Chapter 6 ==
Viking. A discussion of the experiments by engineer Gilbert Levin to search for life on Mars in the 1970s as part of the Viking program. Levin's Labeled Release experiment appeared to conclusively show that life does exist on Mars, but as his results were not supported by the other three Viking biological experiments, they were called into question and eventually not accepted by NASA, which instead hypothesized that the gases observed being generated may not have been a product of living metabolism but of a chemical reaction of hydrogen peroxide. Brooks goes into detail on some of Levin's other experiments and also describes how NASA's subsequent missions to Mars have focused on the geology and climate of the planet rather than looking for life on the planet. (Several missions are searching for water and geological conditions which could support life on Mars currently or in the past.)

== Chapter 7 ==
The Wow! Signal. Brooks discusses whether or not the signal spotted by astronomer Jerry R. Ehman at the Big Ear radio telescope of Ohio State University in 1977 was a genuine indication of intelligent life in outer space. This was a remarkably clear signal and Big Ear was the largest and longest running SETI (Search for Extra-Terrestrial Intelligence) radio-telescope project in the world. Brooks goes on to discuss the abandonment of NASA's Microwave Observing Program after government funding was stopped by the efforts of senator Richard Bryan of Nevada. There is no public funding for similar observations today while the SETI Institute, which continues NASA's work, is funded by private donation, as are a number of other initiatives.

== Chapter 8 ==
A Giant Virus. Brooks describes the huge and highly resistant Mimivirus found in Bradford, England in 1992 and whether this challenges the traditional view of viruses being inanimate chemicals rather than living things. Mimivirus is not only much larger than most viruses but it also has a much more complex genetic structure. The discovery of Mimivirus has given weight to the theories of microbiologist Philip Bell and others that viral infection was indeed the reason for the emergence from primitive life forms of complex cell structures based on a cell nucleus. Study of the behaviour and structure of viruses is ongoing.

== Chapter 9 ==
Death. Beginning with the example of Blanding's turtle and certain species of fish, amphibians and reptiles that do not age as they grow older, Brooks discusses theories and research into the evolution of ageing. These include the studies of Peter Medawar and George C. Williams in the 1950s and Thomas Johnson, David Friedman and Cynthia Kenyon in the 1980s claiming that ageing is a genetic process that has evolved as organisms select genes that help them to grow and reproduce over ones that help them to thrive in later life. Brooks also talks about Leonard Hayflick, as well as others, who have observed that cells in culture will at a fixed point in time stop reproducing and die as their DNA eventually becomes corrupted by continuous division, a mechanical process at cell level rather than part of a creature's genetic code.

== Chapter 10 ==
Sex. This chapter is a discussion of theories of the evolution of sexual reproduction. The provided explanation is that although asexual reproduction is much easier and more efficient for an organism it is less common than sexual reproduction because having two parents allows species to adapt and evolve more easily to survive in changing environments. Brooks discusses efforts to prove this by laboratory experiment and goes on to discuss alternative theories including the work of Joan Roughgarden of Stanford University who proposes that sexual reproduction, rather than being driven by Charles Darwin's sexual selection in individuals, is a mechanism for the survival of social groupings, which most higher species depend on for survival.

== Chapter 11 ==
Free Will. Discusses the experimental investigations into the Neuroscience of free will by Benjamin Libet of the University of California, San Francisco and others, which show that the brain seems to commit to certain decisions before the person becomes aware of having made them and discusses the implications of these findings on our conception of free will.

== Chapter 12 ==
The Placebo Effect. This is a discussion of the role of the placebo in modern medicine, including examples such as Diazepam, which, Brooks claims, in some situations appears to work only if the patient knows they are taking it. Brooks describes research into prescription behaviour which appears to show that use of placebos is commonplace. He describes the paper by Asbjørn Hrobjartsson and Peter C. Gøtzsche in the New England Journal of Medicine that challenges use of placebos entirely, and the work of others towards an understanding of the mechanism of the effect.

== Chapter 13 ==
Homeopathy. Brooks discusses the work of researcher Madeleine Ennis involving a homeopathic solution which once contained histamine but was diluted to the point where no histamine remained. Brooks conjectures that the results might be explained by some previously unknown property of water. Brooks supports the investigation of documented anomalies even though he is critical of the practice of homeopathy in general, as are many of the scientists he cites, such as Martin Chaplin of South Bank University.
