= Astrology software =

Computer software used for astrology

Sample output from an astrology program. The table above the natal chart shows the birth time, location, and the positions of the planets in the signs and houses. The other table lists the aspects and their respective orbs.

Astrology software is a type of computer programs designed to calculate astrological horoscopes. Many of them also assemble interpretive text into narrative reports.

== History ==
Astro Computing Services (ACS) in San Diego, founded by Neil Michelsen in 1973, published a computer-generated astrological ephemeris in 1976, The American Ephemeris.

When personal computers generally became available, astrologers and astrology hobbyists were able to purchase them and use astrological or astronomical calculation software or make such programs themselves. Astrologer and computer programmer Michael Erlewine was involved early in making astrological software for microcomputers available to the general public in the late 1970s. In 1978, Erlewine founded Matrix Software, and in 1980 he published a book with all the algorithms and data required for owners of microcomputers to make their own complete astrological programs. At first, astrology software was opposed by American astrologers who did not approve of computers in their field. However, acceptance grew as it became clear how more efficient and profitable such software could be.

A few hundred fixed-purpose astrology computers were made. One of which, the Digicomp DR-70 Astrology Minicomputer, was used by Nancy Reagan's astrologer Joan Quigley beginning in about 1981.

Astrology software has been made available in the open-source model, starting with the release of Astrolog in 1991.

== Features ==
Computer astrology programs today typically make accurate planet position calculations, display and print these positions using astrological glyph symbols in graphic charts, save and retrieve individuals' data to and from database files, compare the planet positions of different charts to find the astrological aspects between them (e.g. for compatibility), calculate the dates of important events in the future for a chart, and research the saved chart database. Some generate colorful geographical maps with lines showing where the planets rise and culminate at a significant time, usually the time of birth or the time of inception of an organization (called astrocartography). Astrology programs usually come bundled with an electronic atlas, allowing the review of the longitudes, latitudes, and time zone observance histories for cities and towns. Many assemble interpretive text about the various element combinations in a chart into comprehensive printed reports.

== Software development tools for astrology ==
Software libraries exist to aid in the development of astronomical software. These libraries can also be leveraged for use in astrological projects. One such tool is Swiss Ephemeris, which is an astronomical almanac developed by Astrodienst AG, Switzerland, the makers of Astrolog. It is widely used for calculating the positions of planets, moons, asteroids, and stars for a given date and time. The library can be integrated with several programming languages including C#, C++, Java, and .NET. The Swiss Ephemeris primarily uses the Jet Propulsion Laboratory Development Ephemeris as its source data for positions of the Sun, Moon and planets. It uses data from Astronomisches Rechen-Institut (ARI) in Heidelberg, Germany for the positions of asteroids.

== See also ==
- Astrolog
- Planetarium software
