= Michael Brooks (science writer) =

English science writer

- Born: 7 May 1970 (age 56)
- Other name: None
- Occupation: Science writer
- Known for: Explaining difficult scientific concepts to people in his books.

Michael Edward Brooks (born 7 May 1970) is an English science writer, noted for explaining complex scientific research and findings to the general population.

== Career ==
Brooks holds a PhD in Quantum Physics from the University of Sussex. He was previously an editor for New Scientist magazine, and currently works as a consultant for that magazine. His writing has appeared in The Guardian, The Independent, The Observer, The Times Higher Education Supplement, and Playboy. His first novel, Entanglement, was published in 2007. His first non-fiction book, an exploration of scientific anomalies entitled 13 Things That Don't Make Sense, was published in 2009. The book expands an article that Brooks wrote for New Scientist.

Brooks' next book, The Big Questions: Physics, was released in February 2010. It contains twenty 3,000-word essays addressing the most fundamental and frequently asked questions about science.

Brooks appeared as a regular guest on George Lamb's BBC Radio 6 Music show. His slot on the show, entitled Weird Science, features weird and wonderful stories from the world of science.

Brooks currently co-presents the podcast Science(ish) with UK presenter Rick Edwards which explores the science behind the movies.

== Science Party ==
Science Party
- Spokesperson: Michael Brooks, Sumit Paul-Choudhury
- Founded: 20 April 2010

The Science Party was a UK political party launched on 20 April 2010 by Brooks and Sumit Paul-Choudhury, an editor of New Scientist.

A key goal in the Science Party manifesto was ensuring "that science, mathematics and engineering have sufficient funding, skills and political priority".

The Science Party challenged MP David Tredinnick in his constituency of Bosworth in the East Midlands, in the 2010 general election on a pro-scientific manifesto. Tredinnick is a supporter of alternative medicine and critical of science.

It was revealed in the 2009 United Kingdom parliamentary expenses scandal that Tredinnick claimed £700 in his MP expenses for astrology software and training, which he repaid following media publicity. Tredinnick also led 70 MPs in a motion to ignore a House of Commons Science and Technology Select Committee report recommending the NHS to cease funding homeopathic treatments.

In criticising Tredinnick, Brooks also points to the cash-for-questions affair, where Tredinnick accepted a £1,000 payment from an under cover reporter for what was described as a consultancy service but which essentially involved raising a question before parliament, an act that has been described as accepting a bribe for interference in parliamentary proceedings. This scandal led to Tredinnick and one other MP being suspended from Parliament. Brooks also criticises Tredinnick for his MP's expense claim of £125 for attending a course on "intimate relationships".

Tredinnick defended his views on using astrology for medicine by saying "Systems of healthcare in India and China have linked medicine and astronomy for centuries. Are we really just dismissing their views?".

Brooks describes Tredinnick as "a champion of pseudoscience and a hindrance to rational governance".

Brooks received 197 votes in the election, 0.4% of the votes cast. The party deregistered in 2011.

== Bibliography ==
=== Books ===
- Quantum Computing and Communications, edited by Brooks (Springer Verlag, 1999)
- Entanglement (2007)
- 13 Things That Don't Make Sense: The most baffling scientific mysteries of our time (Profile Books, 2008); US, Doubleday, 2008
- Physics (Quercus Books, The Big Questions, 2010)
- Free Radicals: The Secret Anarchy of Science (Profile, 2011, ISBN 978-1-84668-405-0)
- Can We Travel Through Time?: The 20 big questions of physics (Quercus, 2012)
- The Quantum Astrologer's Handbook (Scribe Books, 2017)
- The Art of More: how mathematics created civilisation (Scribe UK, 9 Sept. 2021, ISBN 1912854953, 978-1912854950. Also published as The Maths that Made Us.

=== Essays and reporting ===
- "In Place of God: Can Secular Science ever oust Religious Belief – and should it even try?", New Scientist, 20 November 2006
- "To Make the Most of Wind Power, Go Fly a Kite", New Scientist, 14 May 2008
- "Smallest Planet weighs just Three Earths", New Scientist, 2 June 2008
- Brooks, Michael (21 November 2014). "Not with a bang but a printer". New Statesman. 143 (5237): 18–19.

———————
