= Jim Lewis (astrologer) =

American astrologer and writer (1941–1995)

- Born: James Lewis Slayden; June 5, 1941; Yonkers, New York, US
- Died: February 21, 1995 (aged 53)
- Occupation: Astrologer
- Known for: Astrocartography
- Awards: Marc Edmund Jones Award (1978); Regulus Award (1992)
- Website: continuumacg.net

Jim Lewis (born James Lewis Slayden; June 5, 1941 – February 21, 1995) was an American astrologer, writer and entrepreneur. He is known for pioneering the technique of Astro*Carto*Graphy, aka astrocartography, which was based on ancient forms of locational astrology.

== Early life ==
James Lewis Slayden was born on June 5, 1941, in Yonkers, New York. He spent time living at a commune in Big Sur, California, where he hunted deer.

== Career ==
Locational astrology is an ancient concept dating to late antiquity and Lewis helped expand this little-known field using detailed hand-drawn maps with transparent overlays showing angularity lines accompanied by "cookbook" style interpretations. He sent out hand-drawn mail-order maps to astrology clients beginning in 1976, branding his techniques Astro*Carto*Graphy.™

These Astro*Carto*Graphy techniques were based on previous work by locational astrologers from ancient times to the19th and early 20th Centuries. This includes well-known works at the time from British astrologer Sepharial and Canadian astrologer Edward Johndro. Techniques similar to Lewis' theories were also developed by other contemporary astrologers. These maps began as simple diagrams of eclipse paths but soon evolved into more sophisticated tools thanks to pioneers like Charles Jayne, Donald Bradley, Steve Cozzi and Martin Jay Davis. By the time Gary Duncan published the first computer-generated Astro Locality Map in 1966, the foundation was well in place for the innovations that followed.

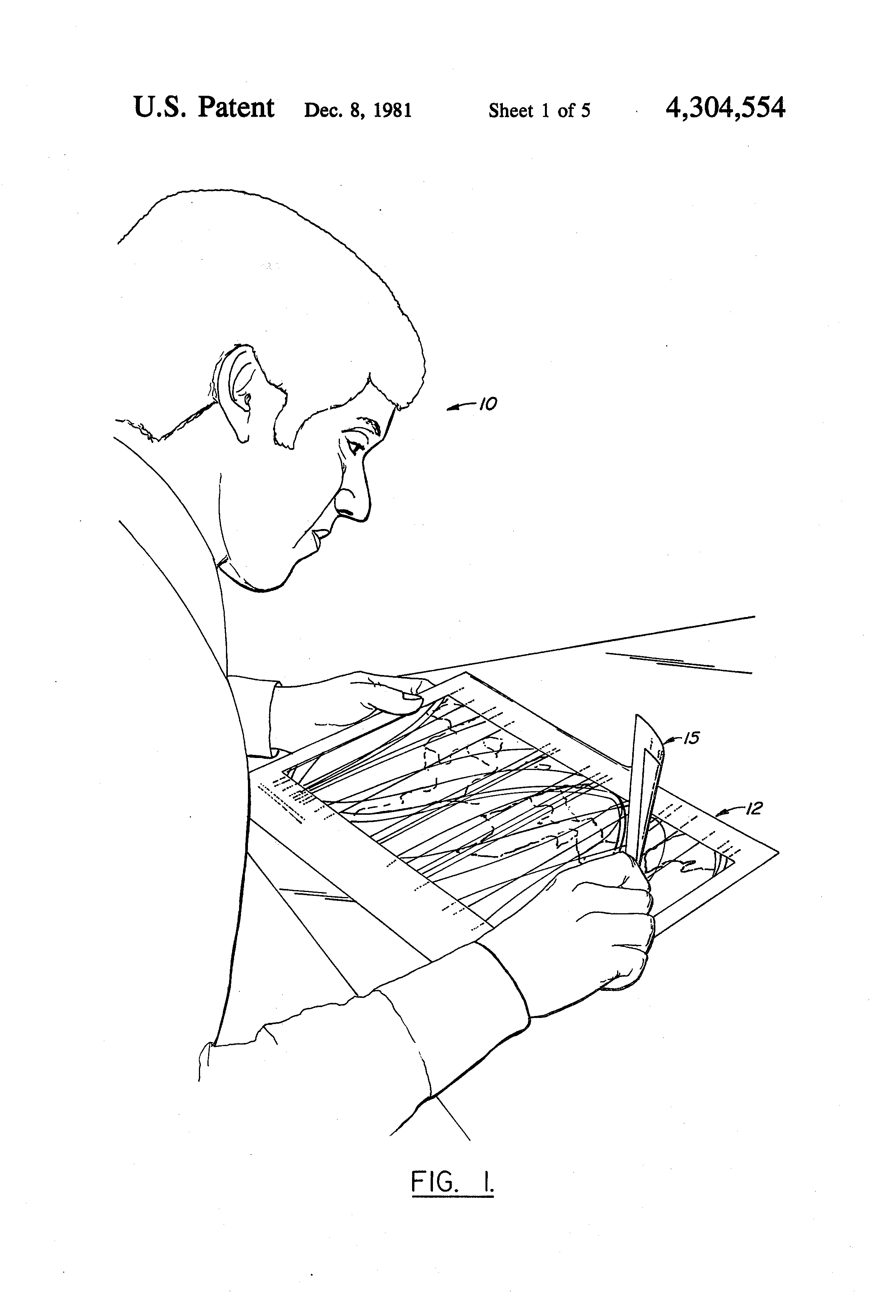
Jim Lewis' Astro*Carto*Graphy hand drawn maps image submitted to the US Patent and Trademark Office in 1980

In 1979, Lewis published the first edition of his annual Sourcebook of Mundane Maps.

Lewis eventually sought the technical expertise of Michael Erlewine, creator of the Local Space technique software, and this collaboration resulted in the first Astro*Carto*Graphy software in the late 1970s.

Lewis service marked the term Astro*Carto*Graphy and submitted a patent application for his hand-drawn technique that "utilizes a transparent overlay that is superimposed on a map" in 1980, which was granted on December 8, 1981. His obituary states that Lewis was well known to be "strongly litigious" about his brand. The patent expired on February 26, 2000 and trademark on the term Astro*Carto*Graphy expired in 2011.

For his pioneering work in continuing to develop and promote the technique via his brand Astro*Carto*Graphy, Lewis received the Marc Edmund Jones Award in 1978, and the "Regulus Award for Discovery, Innovation, and Research" at the United Astrology Congress in Washington, D.C., in 1992.

Lewis lectured throughout the world and regularly conducted seminars in which he trained students in Astro*Carto*Graphy techniques. He later went on to administer a certification exam. Candidates who passed his stringent qualifications were given a certificate as a professional Astro*Carto*Grapher.

== Personal life and death ==
Lewis was gay and lived in San Francisco for most of his life. In the mid-1980s he was struck by a vehicle while crossing Military Road in Sydney, Australia, which is on his Mars Ascending line. Lewis died of a brain tumor in San Francisco on February 21, 1995, at age 53.

== Legacy ==
In his will, Lewis provided for the formation of the Astro*Carto*Graphy Trust. In 1999, the Trust posthumously applied for a trademark for the specific mark "ASTRO*CARTO*GRAPHY", which was granted on October 3, 2000. The registration was cancelled by the United States Patent and Trademark Office on May 6, 2011, after expiring. According to the Trust's website as of December 2025, they continue to charge astrologers $150 to take a test by mail and become 'Astro*Carto*Graphy Continuum Certified,' based on the expired trademark. They also offer transcripts of Jim Lewis lectures for a fee.

His book The Astro*Carto*Graphy Book of Maps: The Astrology of Relocation was co-authored by Gail Guttman and published in 1981 by Llewellyn. Another book The Psychology of Astro*Carto*Graphy (though Lewis was never a trained or licensed psychologist) was published posthumously by his friend Kenneth Irving in 1997 in the UK. The book was later revised and re-published with updated information in 2012 and 2024 by Words and Things.

== Selected publications ==
- Lewis, Jim (2004) [1985]. "And the future will be nothing less than the flowering of our inwardness". In Mann, A. T. (ed.). The Future of Astrology (Revised ed.). New York City: Paraview Press. pp. 115–130. ISBN 978-1-61640-644-8. LCCN 2004103709. OCLC 1132385786.
- Lewis, Jim; Guttman, Gail (1989). The Astro*Carto*Graphy Book of Maps: The Astrology of Relocation. Saint Paul, Minnesota: Llewellyn Publications. ISBN 978-0875424347. LCCN 89008070. OCLC 19627006.
- Lewis, Jim; Irving, Kenneth (2012) [1997]. The Psychology of Astro*Carto*Graphy (Revised ed.). New York City: Words and Things. ISBN 978-0-9844280-0-7. LCCN 97223553. OCLC 1451038510.
- Lewis, Jim (2002). Sullivan, Erin (ed.). Peter Pan in Midlife and the Midlife of America: A Personal and Collective Memoir. Silver City, New Mexico: Southwest Contemporary Astrology.

== Bibliography ==
- Davis, Martin (2008). From Here to There: An Astrologer's Guide to Astromapping (PDF). Bournemouth: Wessex Astrologer. ISBN 978-1-902405-27-8. OCLC 465329874.
- Baigent, Michael; Campion, Nicholas; Harvey, Charles (1984). Mundane Astrology. Wellingborough, Northamptonshire: The Aquarian Press. ISBN 978-0-85030-302-5. LCCN 84670152. OCLC 1015004104.
- Mann, A.T. (2004) [1987]. The Future of Astrology. New York City: Paraview Press. ISBN 978-1-931044-87-5. LCCN 2004103709. OCLC 57641554.
- Stuart-Haas, Rachel (2021). The House Your Stars Built: A Guide to the Twelve Astrological Houses and Your Place in the Universe. New York City: Tiller Press. ISBN 978-1-982164-86-7. LCCN 2020044790. OCLC 1162985369.
- Tyl, Noel Jan, ed. (1995). Astrology Looks at History. Saint Paul, Minnesota: Llewellyn Publications. ISBN 978-1-56718-868-4. LCCN 95012689. OCLC 32510745.
