= Alan Leo =

British astrologer and author (1860–1917)

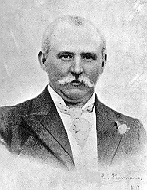
- Alan Leo
- Born: William Frederick Allan; 7 August 1860; Westminster, England
- Died: 30 August 1917 (aged 57); Bude, England
- Occupation: Astrologer
- Known for: Founding modern astrology

Alan Leo, born William Frederick Allan, (7 August 1860 – 30 August 1917) was an English astrologer, author, publisher, astrological data collector and theosophist. He is often referred to as "the father of modern astrology".

His work stimulated a revival of astrology in the Western world after its decline at the end of the 17th century. Leo was a devout theosophist and he worked many of its religious concepts such as karma and reincarnation into his astrology. He used the Theosophical Society's vast international connections to publish, translate and disseminate his work across Europe and America.

Leo and his wife, Bessie, were both Freemasons in Lodge Hermes, no. 20 in the British Federation of what is now the International Order of Freemasonry for Men and Women, LE DROIT HUMAIN. Leo's regalia is on display at the Federation headquarters.

== Astrological technique and influence ==
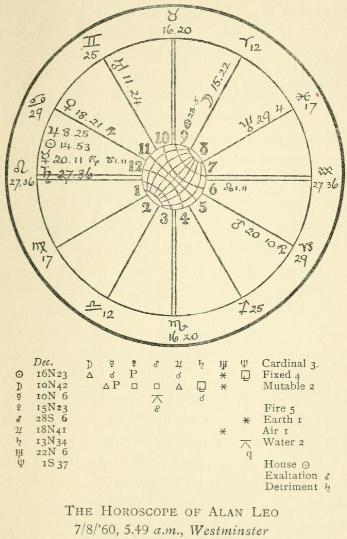
Alan Leo's natal chart

Leo was born in Westminster, and took the name of his sun-sign as a pseudonym, is credited with starting the movement towards a more psychologically-oriented horoscope analysis in astrology, being the first astrologer to argue for a loose interpretation of possible trends of experience rather than the specific prediction of events. His influence has been described as marking a 'turning point' in horoscope delineation, because, as astrological historian James Holden explains:

Thereafter, what has been more recently called "event-oriented" astrology gradually receded in favor of character analysis and vague descriptions of possible areas of psychological harmony or stress.

In 1890, Leo invited George R.S. Mead to found an occult lodge in Brixton, South London. Towards the end of his life, in 1909, and again in 1911, Leo travelled with his wife Bessie Leo to India where he studied Indian astrology. As a result of his studies in India, he later attempted to incorporate portions of Indian astrology into the western astrological model.

Leo's book The Art of Synthesis (1912) was a probable influence on Gustav Holst's work The Planets. In this book, Leo gave the planets descriptions such as "Mars the Energiser".

Leo was a non-smoker, teetotaller and vegetarian. In 1915, Leo founded the Astrological Lodge of London.

== Legal controversies and death ==
In 1914, aged 54, Leo faced prosecution against the charge that he "did unlawfully pretend to tell fortunes" through astrology. The case was dismissed for lack of evidence, but it led to Leo's belief that astrology needed to be revised to be legitimised. His advice to fellow astrologers was:

Let us part company with the fatalistic astrologer who prides himself on his predictions and who is ever seeking to convince the world that in the predictive side of Astrology alone shall we find its value. We need not argue the point as to its reality, but instead make a much-needed change in the word and call Astrology the science of tendencies.

In 1917 Leo stood trial again on a similar charge. Despite his insistence that he told only "tendencies" and not "fortunes", he lost his case and was fined £5 plus costs. Leo was convicted of fortune-telling on 16 July 1917. He died a few weeks later from an apoplexy (cerebral haemorrhage), at 10:00 am on 30 August 1917, whilst on a holiday at Bude in Cornwall, which was intended to restore his health after the ordeals of the trial. He had used the 'holiday' as a period in which he rewrote hundreds of pages of astrological text to "recast the whole system and make it run more along the lines of character reading and less as the assertion of an inevitable destiny", despite being warned by his wife that "he needed rest badly after the worry and anxiety of the law case", and was overworking himself and heading for a breakdown. After his sudden death the rewriting of his work was completed by his friend and colleague H.S. Greene. Greene also remarked on how the 1917 prosecution had caused worry for Leo during the process of the trial.

== Works ==
- The Astrologer's Magazine, edited by Alan Leo, Vol. IV (1894) Vol. V series 1895–.
- How to Judge a Nativity. 2 vols. 1904. Reprint, London: Modern Astrology Office, 1928.
- Astrology for All series 1903–.
- The Progressed Horoscope. London: Fowler 1906.
- Horary Astrology. London: Modern Astrology Office, 1909.
- The Key to your own Nativity. London: Modern Astrology Office, 1910.
- The Art of Synthesis. Originally published 1912 as "How to Judge a Nativity" in the Astrology for All series. London: Fowler 1968.
- Casting the Horoscope. London: Modern Astrology Office, 1912.
- Esoteric Astrology, first published 1913. Destiny Books, Rochester, Vermont, 1989. ISBN 0-89281-181-1
- Alan Leo's Dictionary of Astrology, edited and completed by Vivian E. Robson. London 1929.
- Thousand and One Notable Nativities: Astrologer's Who's Who. Publisher: L.N. Fowler & Co; 2nd edition (1917),ISBN 978-0553234145
