= Locational astrology =

Astrology that factors in locations on Earth

Locational astrology (sometimes referred to as astrocartography or astrogeography) is any of various types of astrology that factor in specific locations of the Earth. The different types also carry a range of astrological techniques.

== Astrogeography ==
The topic of astrological geography is the astrological study of the lands, the features, the inhabitants, and the phenomena of the Earth. The origins of astrogeography (commonly referred to as astrocartography) may possibly go back to the roots of astrology in Mesopotamian Culture.

Nicholas Campion names Marcus Manilius (1st century) and Claudius Ptolemaeus (2nd century) to be the first authors to deliver a system of rulership of zodiac signs for regions. Others are Al-Biruni (11th century), William Lilly (17th century), Raphael (19th century), Green and Sepharial (20th century).

An important systematic approach to astrogeography was developed by various astrologers such as Sepharial (Walter Gorn Old) in England, and A. M. Grimm in Germany. Both these systems assume that the Greenwich Meridian in metropolitan London has a 0° Aries fixed local MC, leaving the various regions of the globe to correspond with the 12 signs of the zodiac. There are subtle differences between the system of Sepharial and Grimm which are not noticeable in many classical astrology methods, but may be noticeable in precision methods such as those of Uranian astrology or cosmobiology.

The Sepharial system was later popularized by Canadian astrologer I. I. McRae, and American astrologer Joyce Wehrman. The Canadian astrologer Lorne Edward Johndro also worked with this method at various points throughout the 1930s and later years, and vacillated between the starting reference point at Greenwich and one near the greater pyramids of Egypt.

In the course of the development of computer technology which made it easier to calculate more elaborate astrogeographical maps the Andersen system was published in 1974. It included 11 newly developed world maps valid for one planet each.

== Astrocartography ==
Astrocartography is the astrological study of the relationship of individuals such as subjects or objects to places on Earth by the projection of relevant horoscopes onto the Earth's surface. For example, a simple approach applies the 360° and minutes of latitude and longitude (each) to the 12 zodiacs of the wheel chart. Maps produced using any of the following methods are used by 'astro-cartographers' to counsel their clients on relocation or travel. (Note: Carlson (1988), pp. 290–291: "Even in the 20th century, astrologers have remained strong in number and powerful in influence, and their art has developed into many diverse forms: Natal astrology, Horary astrology, Sabian astrology, Humanistic astrology, Medical astrology, Astro-cartography, [...] 'Astro-cartographers' frequently counsel clients to move to other parts of their country, and even to emigrate to where the astrological influences will supposedly be more favorable.")

One astrological cartography system is named "local space astrology", developed by German astrologer Friedrich Sieggrün and later popularized in the United States by Steve Cozzi and astrological software developer Michael Erlewine.

Another method in astrological cartography was based on findings by Don Neroman, Gustav Schwickert, Cyril Fagan, Roy Charles Firebrace and Donald A. Bradleyand developed from about 1930 until the 1960s. In the 1970s and 1980s it was further developed and made popular by Jim Lewis. This system focuses on elements of the natal chart, by identifying these factors on a world map. Lewis' maps show all locations on the earth where planets were "angular" (rising, setting, on the zenith or nadir) at the moment of an event like a person's birth. An "angular" planet is one that is conjunct one of these four angles (Ascendant, Descendant, MC or IC). These locations are displayed in the form of lines on the map.

Another example is the "Astrolocality Map" developed by Astro Computing Services of San Diego. In addition to the lines on Lewis' maps, it shows conjunctions to the angles, and includes planetary squares, trines, and other aspects. (Note: Davis (2007), p. 8: "Neil F. Michelson (1931-1990) of Astro Computing Services began offering 'Astrolocality Maps' in 1984. These geographic maps of angularity (similar to A*C*G maps) were notable for their inclusion of aspect lines (60,90 or 120°) from the Midheaven or Ascending lines.")

== Astrological geomancy ==
Astrological geomancy is any approach to examine and understand the astrological qualities of places. In astrological geomancy places are studied not through projections from maps like in astrogeography but through consideration and comparison of the microcosmic system of places in the overall system of the landscape. The surroundings, the use, animals and plants, features of buildings and architecture, events and all possible features of places can be evaluated in astrological geomancy but the most important element would be the landscape.

In Chinese geomancy (feng shui) astrological signs, symbols and categories have been traditionally used.

== See also ==
- Astrology software
