= List of Albert Einstein College of Medicine people =

This list includes deans, notable alumni and faculty of the Albert Einstein College of Medicine.

== Leadership ==
- Marcus D. Kogel, founding dean, November 1, 1953–1967. Prior to becoming dean, he was New York City's commissioner of Hospitals.
- Harry H. Gordon, dean, 1967–1970
- Labe C. Scheinberg, dean, 1970–1972
- Ernst R. Jaffé, acting dean, 1972 – September 1, 1974 and 1983 – August 1, 1984
- Ephraim Friedman, dean, September 1, 1974–1983
- Dominick P. Purpura, the Marilyn and Stanley M. Katz Dean, August 1, 1984 – June 1, 2006. His 22 years as dean are a record for the head of a medical school.
- Allen M. Spiegel, the Marilyn and Stanley M. Katz Dean, June 1, 2006 – June 30, 2018. Spiegel was previously the director of the National Institute of Diabetes and Digestive and Kidney Diseases at the National Institutes of Health, where he worked for over 30 years.
- Gordon F. Tomaselli, the Marilyn and Stanley M. Katz Dean, July 16, 2018 – July 30, 2023. Tomaselli is a graduate of the Class of 1982 and was previously chief of the Division of Cardiology and co-director of the Heart and Vascular Institute at Johns Hopkins University School of Medicine.
- Yaron Tomer, the Marilyn and Stanley M. Katz Dean, October 2, 2023–present. Tomer was previously chair of Medicine at Einstein and Montefiore Medical Center.

== Notable alumni ==
- Andrea Apolo (Class of 2003), medical oncologist and head of the Bladder Cancer Section at the National Cancer Institute
- Joseph H. Berke, psychiatrist who helped Mary Barnes, a nurse with schizophrenia, emerge from madness; she became a famous artist and writer
- Richard Bernstein (Class of 1983), endocrinologist, developed methods for diabetics to monitor their own glucose levels
- William Breitbart (Class of 1978), psychiatrist, chairman of the Department of Psychiatry & Behavioral Sciences at Memorial Sloan Kettering Cancer Center in New York City
- Amanda M. Brown (Class of 1996), professor of neurology and neuroscience at Johns Hopkins University School of Medicine
- Lynda Chin (Class of 1993), department chair and professor of genomic medicine at the University of Texas M.D. Anderson Cancer Center, scientific director of the M.D. Anderson Institute for Applied Cancer Science, and married to Ronald DePinho (see below)
- Luz Claudio (Class of 1990), researcher on asthma in low-income communities
- Raymond Vahan Damadian (Class of 1960), pioneer of MRI; founder, president, and chairman of the Fonar Corporation; professor of medicine and radiology at SUNY Health Science Center at Brooklyn
- Howard Dean (Class of 1978), former governor of Vermont and chairman of the Democratic National Committee, and 2004 presidential candidate; met his wife, Judith Steinberg Dean, while they were both students at Einstein
- Judith Steinberg Dean (Class of 1978), former first lady of Vermont
- Ronald A. DePinho (Class of 1981), cancer biologist, married to Lynda Chin (see above)
- Kathleen McCormack Durst (Class of 1982 – did not graduate), former wife of Robert Durst who went missing in 1982 during her fourth year of medical school
- Neal E. Flomenbaum (Class of 1973), emergency medicine physician, emergency physician-in-chief at New York-Presbyterian Hospital/Cornell Medical Center, medical director of the New York-Presbyterian Emergency Medical Service, and professor of Clinical Medicine at Cornell Medical College
- Raja M. Flores (Class of 1992), cardiothoracic surgeon, chief of the Division of Thoracic Surgery at Mount Sinai Hospital and Ames Professor of Cardiothoracic Surgery at the Mount Sinai School of Medicine
- Marc Galanter (Class of 1971), psychiatrist and deputy director of the Division of Alcoholism and Drug Abuse in the Department of Psychiatry at New York University School of Medicine
- Janina R. Galler (Class of 1972), psychiatrist, co-founder and director of the 45+-year Barbados Nutrition Study
- Sankar Ghosh (Class of 1988), Silverstein & Hutt Family Professor and chairman of the Department of Microbiology and Immunology at Columbia University; researcher of transcription factor NF-KB
- Billy Goldberg (Class of 1992), emergency medicine physician at Bellevue Hospital, assistant professor at the NYU School of Medicine, and author
- Michael Grodin (Class of 1976), professor of Health Law, Bioethics, and Human Rights at the Boston University School of Public Health, chairman of the Institutional Review Board of the Department of Health and Hospitals of the City of Boston
- Harvey Karp (Class of 1976), pediatrician, assistant professor of Pediatrics at the David Geffen School of Medicine at UCLA; author of The Happiest Baby on the Block
- George Kuo (Class of 1972, Ph.D.), co-discoverer of the hepatitis C virus
- Rudolph Leibel (Class of 1967), discoverer of the hormone leptin and cloning of the leptin and leptin receptor genes
- Noah Mckay (Class of 1983), Iranian-American physician and bioweapons researcher
- Liise-anne Pirofski (Class of 1982), researcher in infectious diseases, immunity, and microbial pathogenesis; developed the "damage-response framework" of microbial pathogenesis
- Jesse Roth (Class of 1959), endocrinologist; researcher in diabetes and obesity; chief of the Diabetes Branch at the National Institute of Diabetes, and Digestive and Kidney Diseases of the National Institutes of Health; Professor of Medicine at Johns Hopkins University School of Medicine and the Albert Einstein College of Medidine
- Jil C. Tardiff (Class of 1992), Steven M. Gootter Endowed Chair for the Prevention of Sudden Cardiac Death and vice chair for Research at the University of Arizona College of Medicine – Tucson
- Sten H. Vermund (Class of 1977), pediatrician, epidemiologist, dean of the Yale School of Public Health
- Stephen Waxman (Class of 1970, PhD and Class of 1972, MD), neurologist and neuroscientist, Bridget Flaherty Professor of Neurology, Neurobiology, and Pharmacology at Yale University
- Jonathan Zizmor (Class of 1969), dermatologist, known by millions of New York City Subway riders for his quirky advertisements

== Notable faculty ==
- Nir Barzilai, professor of Medicine (Endocrinology) and of Genetics, and director of the Institute for Aging Research, 1993–present
- Barry Bloom, professor and chairman of the Department of Microbiology and Immunology, 1978–1990
- Nancy Carrasco, Department of Molecular Pharmacology, 1987–2011
- Arturo Casadevall, professor of Medicine and of Microbiology and Immunology, 1991–2011, and chairman of the Department of Microbiology and Immunology, 2007–2011
- Ana Maria Cuervo, Distinguished Professor, Department of Developmental & Molecular Biology; Distinguished Professor, Department of Medicine (Hepatology); Robert and Renée Belfer Chair for the Study of Neurodegenerative Diseases
- Marie Daly, professor of Biochemistry and Medicine, 1960–1986
- Leo M. Davidoff, professor and founding chairman of the Department of Neurosurgery, 1955–1966
- Ernest Drucker, professor of Family and Social Medicine
- Harry Eagle, professor of Pathology, 1961–1988
- Bernard N. Fields, professor of Medicine and of Cell Biology, 1968–1975
- Alfred Gilman, professor and founding chairman of the Department of Pharmacology, 1956–1973
- Jeffrey P. Gold, professor and chairman of the Department of Cardiovascular and Thoracic Surgery, cardiovascular and thoracic surgeon-in-chief at Montefiore Medical Center, 1996–2005
- James T. Goodrich, professor of Clinical Neurological Surgery, Pediatrics, Plastic and Reconstructive Surgery, 1998–2020
- Ruth Gottesman, professor emerita, chair of the board of trustees, and major benefactor
- Susan Band Horwitz, professor of Molecular Pharmacology and recipient of the Gairdner Foundation International Award, 1967–present
- William R. Jacobs Jr., professor of Microbiology and Immunology, and of Genetics, and Howard Hughes Medical Institute Investigator, 1987–present
- Murray Jarvik, professor of Pharmacology, 1955–1972
- Geoffrey Kabat, professor of Epidemiology
- Leopold Koss, cytopathologist, professor of Pathology and chairman of the Department of Pathology, 1973–2012
- Steven K. Libutti, professor of Surgery and of Genetics, 2009–2017
- Irving M. London, professor of Medicine and founding chairman of the Department of Medicine, 1955–1970
- Julius Marmur, professor, Department of Biochemistry, 1963–1996
- Gertie Marx, professor, Department of Anesthesiology and pioneer of obstetric anesthesiology, 1955–1995
- Mary Jane Osborn, associate professor of Biochemistry, 1963–1968
- Liise-anne Pirofski, professor of Medicine, 1988–present
- Tia Powell, professor of Clinical Epidemiology and Clinical Psychiatry, 2009–present
- Isabelle Rapin, professor of Neurology and of Pediatrics, 1958–2012
- Oliver Sacks, professor of Neurology, 1966–2007
- Berta Scharrer, professor of Anatomy and Structural Biology and of Neuroscience, 1955–1995
- Ernst Scharrer, professor and founding chairman of the Department of Anatomy, 1954–1965
- Victor W. Sidel, professor and chairman of the Department of Social Medicine, 1969–2018
- Robert H. Singer, professor and co-chairman, Department of Anatomy and Structural Biology
- Edmund Sonnenblick, professor and director of the Cardiology Division 1975–1996
- Kakarla Subba Rao, professor of Radiology, 1970s–1986
- Sam Switzer, assistant professor of Medicine, 1960–1967
- Wolfgang A. Tomé, professor of Radiation Oncology, founding director of Medical Physics of the Institute for Onco-Physics, director of the Division of Therapeutic Medical Physics in the Department of Radiation Oncology at Montefiore Medical Center, 2012–present
- Marc Van Ranst, Belgian virologist, 1965
- Sten H. Vermund, pediatrician, epidemiologist, dean of the Yale School of Public Health, 1985–1994
- Jan Vijg, professor and chairman of Genetics, 2008–present
- Sylvia Wassertheil-Smoller, professor of Epidemiology, 1969–present
- Abraham White, professor and inaugural chairman of biochemistry, 1953–1972
