= Skill =

Ability to carry out a task

A skill is the learned or innate ability to act with determined results and good execution often within a given amount of time, energy, or both. Skills can often be divided into domain-general and domain-specific skills. Examples of general skills include time management, teamwork, leadership, and self-motivation. In contrast, domain-specific skills would be used only for a certain job, e.g. operating a sand blaster. Skill usually requires certain environmental stimuli and situations to assess the level of skill being shown and used.

A skill may be called an art when it represents a body of knowledge or branch of learning, as in the art of medicine or the art of war. Although the arts are also skills, there are many skills that form an art but have no connection to the fine arts.

People need a broad range of skills to contribute to the modern economy. A joint ASTD and U.S. Department of Labor study showed that through technology, the workplace is changing, and identified 16 basic skills that employees must have to be able to change with it. Three broad categories of skills are suggested: technical, human, and conceptual. The first two can be substituted with hard and soft skills, respectively.

== Hard skills ==
Hard skills, also called technical skills, are any skills relating to a specific task or situation. It involves both understanding and proficiency in such specific activity that involves methods, processes, procedures, or techniques. These skills are easily quantifiable unlike soft skills, which are related to one's personality. These are also skills that can be or have been tested and may entail some professional, technical, or academic qualification.

== Holistic competency ==
Holistic competencies is an umbrella term for different types of generic skills (e.g., critical thinking, problem-solving skills, positive values, and attitudes (e.g., resilience, appreciation for others)) which are essential for life-long learning and whole-person development.

== Labor skills ==
Skilled workers have long had historical import (see division of labour) as electricians, masons, carpenters, blacksmiths, bakers, brewers, coopers, printers and other occupations that are economically productive. Skilled workers were often politically active through their craft guilds.

== Life skills ==
An ability and capacity acquired through deliberate, systematic, and sustained effort to smoothly and adaptively carry out complex activities or job functions involving ideas (cognitive skills), things (technical skills), and/or people (interpersonal skills).

== People skills ==
According to the Portland Business Journal, people skills are described as:

- understanding ourselves and moderating our responses
- talking effectively and empathizing accurately
- building relationships of trust, respect and productive interactions.

A British definition is "the ability to communicate effectively with people in a friendly way, especially in business." The term is already listed in major US dictionaries.

The term people skills is used to include both psychological skills and social skills but is less inclusive than life skills.

== Social skills ==
Social skills are any skills facilitating interaction and communication with others. Social rules and relations are created, communicated, and changed in verbal and nonverbal ways. The process of learning such skills is called socialization.

== Soft skills ==
Soft skills are a combination of interpersonal people skills, social skills, communication skills, character traits, attitudes, career attributes and emotional intelligence quotient (EQ) among others.

== Development and maintenance ==
Development of a very high level of skill is often desirable for economic, social, or personal reasons.

In his 2008 book Outliers, Canadian journalist Malcolm Gladwell proposed the "10,000 hour rule", that world-class skill could be developed by practicing for 10,000 hours. This principle was disputed by other commentators, pointing out feedback is necessary for improvement, and that practice is no guarantee of success.

In his 2019 book Range: Why Generalists Triumph in a Specialized World, David Epstein argues that a period of sampling different activities (whether musical instruments, sports, or professions) can be helpful before choosing a specialization. Epstein argues that many tasks require a variety of skills which tend to be possessed by more well-rounded people, and finding a task which is a better fit to one's personality and interests can overcome the advantage otherwise provided by having more practice earlier in life and attempting peak performance as a younger person. Someone who has demonstrated a high level of knowledge or skill in multiple disciplines is known as a polymath, or in musical performance, a multi-instrumentalist.

A related synthesis was offered by Waqas Ahmed in The Polymath: Unlocking the Power of Human Versatility (2019), which examines how individuals across history have deliberately cultivated breadth across disciplines alongside deep expertise, and argues this capacity, termed versatility, represents a distinct and trainable human capability.

A long-standing question is to what extent skills can be learned versus the degree that innate talent is required for high-caliber performance. Epstein finds evidence for both sides with respect to high-performance sport in his 2013 book The Sports Gene. For thinking tasks, the heritability of IQ has been extensively studied to try to answer this question, though does not necessarily map directly onto skill level for any given thinking task.

A study of professional and master tenpin bowlers found that average scores declined less than 10% from age 20 to age 70. This decline in a sport focusing on skill and technique is considerably smaller than that of events dominated by muscular strength, cardiovascular endurance or agility—which are known to decrease about 10% per decade.

=== Skill building ===
Skill building is a hands-on active learning and experiential learning by-doing approach to education, in contrast to lectures and rote learning where the student plays a very passive role.

== See also ==
- Communication skills
- Competence (human resources)
- Deskilling
- DISCO - European Dictionary of Skills and Competences
- Dreyfus model of skill acquisition
- Forecast skill
- Game of skill
- Lifelong learning
- List of educational software
- Online skill-based game
- Object skill
- Procedural knowledge
- Transferable skills analysis
