= Arturo Casadevall =

Cuban-American scientist

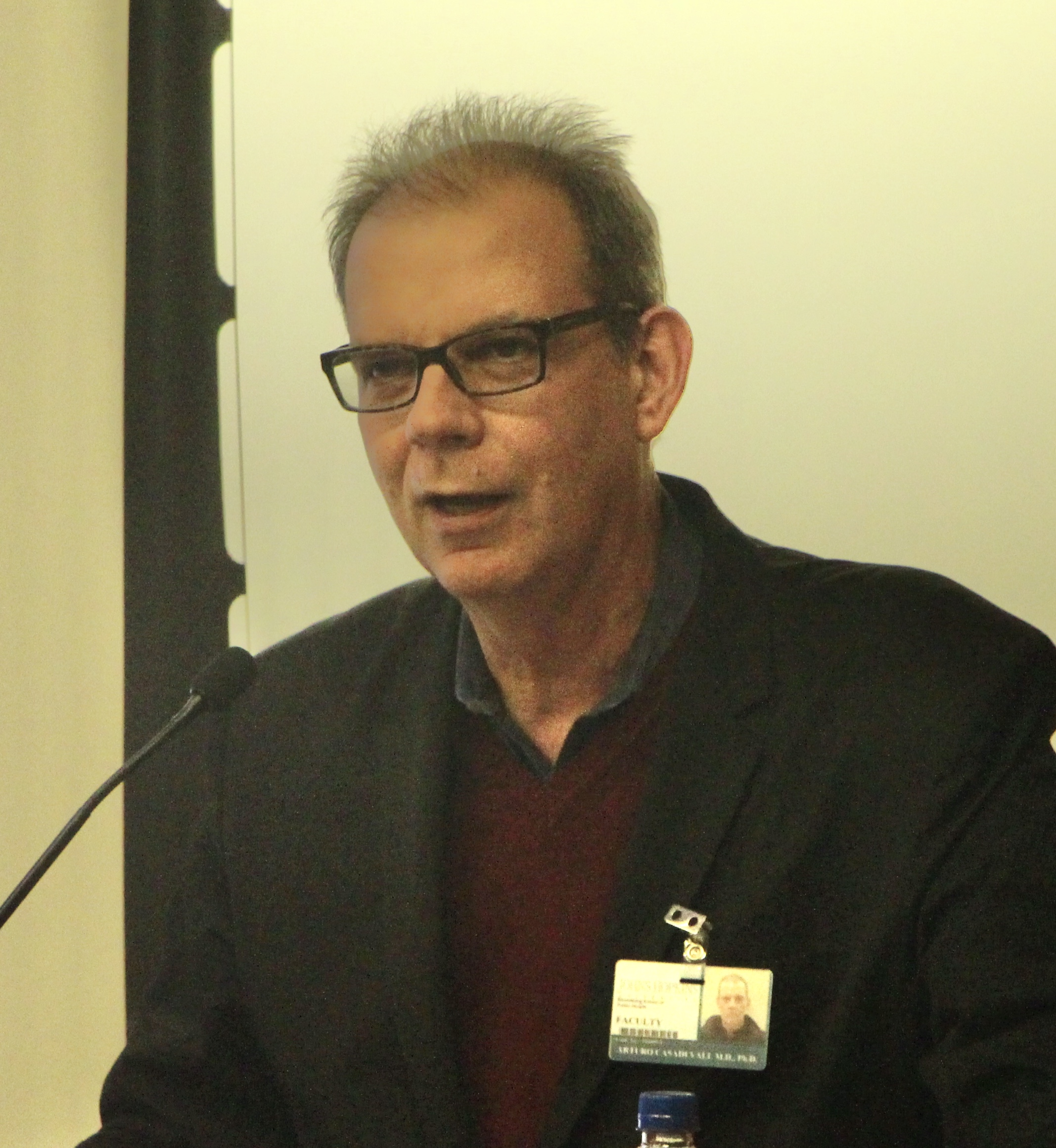
- Dr. Arturo Casadevall speaking about "Promoting Diversity and Inclusion in the Research of Health and Medicine" at the Osler Medical Symposium, held at Johns Hopkins University.
- Born: Arturo Casadevall; 1957 (age 68–69); Sancti Spíritus, Cuba
- Education: Queens College, City University of New York (B.A.); New York University(M.S., Ph.D., M.D.)
- Known for: Fungal and bacterial pathogenesis Setosphaeria rostrata Cryptococcus neoformans Mycobacterium tuberculosis Bacillus anthracis mBio
- Awards: Bloomberg Distinguished Professorships (2015); NIH Merit Award (2007); AAAS Fellow (2006)
- Scientific career
- Fields: Microbiology; Immunology; Infectious Diseases
- Workplaces: Johns Hopkins University
- Doctoral advisor: Loren A. Day
- Website: Faculty Webpage

Arturo Casadevall is a Bloomberg Distinguished Professor of Molecular Microbiology & Immunology and Infectious Diseases at the Johns Hopkins Bloomberg School of Public Health and Johns Hopkins School of Medicine, and the Alfred and Jill Sommer Professor and Chair of the W. Harry Feinstone Department of Molecular Microbiology and Immunology at the Johns Hopkins Bloomberg School of Public Health. He is an internationally recognized expert in infectious disease research, with a focus on fungal and bacterial pathogenesis and basic immunology of antibody structure-function. He was elected a member of the National Academy of Sciences in 2022.

== Biography ==
Arturo Casadevall was born in Sancti Spíritus, Cuba, in 1957 from a Catalan-descendant family. He is the great-great-great-grandson of Colonel José Martínez-Fortún y Erlés, the first Marquis of Placetas. He moved to Elmhurst, Queens, New York City in 1968 and became a U.S. citizen in 1976. Prior to his career in medicine, Casadevall worked at McDonald's for 4 years and later as a bank teller. Casadevall received his Bachelor of Arts degree in Chemistry from Queens College, City University of New York in 1979, and his M.S. and Ph.D in Biochemistry from New York University in 1983 and 1984. He then received his M.D. from New York University in 1985. Casadevall completed his internship and residency in internal medicine at the Bellevue Hospital Center, and a fellowship in infectious diseases at the Montefiore Medical Center of the Albert Einstein College of Medicine. Under the guidance of Matthew D. Scharff, he completed a postdoctoral fellowship in immunology at the Albert Einstein College of Medicine from 1989 to 1991.

In 1992, he accepted an assistant professorship in medicine and microbiology & immunology at Albert Einstein College of Medicine. In 2000, he became the director of the Division of Infectious Diseases at Montefiore Medical Center and rose to the rank of full professor by 2001. In 2002, he was named the Selma and Jacques Mitrani Professor in Biomedical Research. In 2006, he became the Chair of the Department of Microbiology and Immunology and was named the Leo and Julia Forchheimer Professor of Microbiology Immunology. He is board-certified by the American Board of Internal Medicine in internal medicine and the subspecialty of infectious diseases.

Until July 2009, Dr. Casadevall served as an editor of the ASM journal Infection and Immunity and continues to serve on the editorial boards of the Journal of Infectious Diseases and the Journal of Experimental Medicine. He is also the founding Editor in Chief of mBio, the first open access general journal of the American Society for Microbiology. He served as a member of the National Science Advisory Board for Biosecurity from 2005 to 2014. Casadevall was also a commissioner for the National Forensic Commission of the United States Department of Justice from 2015 to 2017.

In March 2015, Casadevall was named a Bloomberg Distinguished Professor at Johns Hopkins University for his accomplishments as an interdisciplinary researcher and excellence in teaching. The Bloomberg Distinguished Professorship program was established in 2013 by a gift from Michael Bloomberg. Casadevall holds appointments in the Johns Hopkins Bloomberg School of Public Health's Department of Molecular Microbiology and Immunology and the Johns Hopkins School of Medicine's Department of Infectious Diseases. He also serves as the Alfred and Jill Sommer Professor and Chair of the W. Harry Feinstone Department of Molecular Microbiology and Immunology at the Bloomberg School of Public Health in 2015. Casadevall is passionate about improving the doctoral curriculum, stating that he wants to "develop a program of putting the 'Ph' [philosophy] back into 'PhD' [...] Hopkins reformed medical education 100 years ago, and now we can experiment with creating better ways of training scientists." In 2017, the R3 (Rigor, Reproducibility and Responsibility) reflecting these values was launched at the Johns Hopkins Bloomberg School of Public Health.

Casadevall is profiled in the last chapter of Range by David Epstein, a book arguing against specialization. Epstein posits that Casadevall's early life experiences, including working odd jobs unrelated to medicine, contributed to his later success.

== Awards and distinctions ==
Casadevall's groundbreaking work in the field of infectious diseases has been recognized by many, including the National Institutes of Health, which presented him with a Merit Award in 2007. He received several distinguished awards, including the Alumni Achievement Award in Basic Science from New York University, the Rhoda Benham Award of the Medical Mycological Society of the Americas, the Kass Lecture from the Infectious Diseases Society of America, and the ASM Founders Distinguished Service Award from the American Society for Microbiology. In 2022, Casadevall received the Lucille Georg Award from the International Society for Human and Animal Mycology.

In 2001, Casadevall received the Samuel M. Rosen outstanding teacher award and in 2008 he was recognized the American Society for Microbiology with the William Hinton Award for "outstanding contributions toward fostering the research training of underrepresented minorities in microbiology." ASM also notes that Casadevall was the first Hispanic Department Chair at the Albert Einstein College of Medicine, and has "provided exemplary training and mentoring to a significant number of minority scientists, and himself served as a role model of success."

He has served as President of the Medical Mycology Society of America, Chair of American Society for Microbiology Division F, Chair of the American Society for Microbiology Career Development Committee, and Co-Chair of the National Institute of Allergy and Infectious Diseases Board of Scientific Counselors, and currently serves on the Scientific Council of the Pasteur Institute. He is a member of the American Society for Clinical Investigation and the Association of American Physicians, and was elected Fellow of the American Association for the Advancement of Science and the American Academy of Microbiology. In 2014, he became an elected member of the National Academy of Medicine and in 2017, he was elected to the American Academy of Arts and Sciences. He was named a Johns Hopkins Gilman Scholar in 2018. In 2022, he was elected to National Academy of Sciences. He was elected a distinguished fellow by the American Association of Immunologists (AAI) in 2023. He is a member of the Council of Foreign Relations.

== Research ==
Bridging the fields of microbiology and immunology, Casadevall's research is focused on fungal and bacterial pathogenesis and basic immunology of antibody structure-function. He has defined much of what is known about fungal pathogenesis and how fungi such as Cryptococcus neoformans evade the host immune response. Fungal infections are particularly dangerous in immunocompromised individuals such as cancer patients undergoing chemotherapy, making this work highly significant. With his collaborator Dr. Ekaterina (Kate) Dadachova, he pioneered the use of radioimmunotherapeutic strategies for the control of systemic fungal and other infections. During the course of his studies, he noted that certain fungi were radioresistant and worked to develop novel therapeutic strategies for a variety of human diseases including melanoma and infectious diseases, such as tuberculosis. He holds several active patents on these approaches.

Casadevall has a long record of outstanding scholarly and leadership contributions. His lab has studied host-microbe interactions with Cryptococcus neoformans, Mycobacterium tuberculosis, and Bacillus anthracis, with a focus on microbial pathogenesis and mechanisms of antibody action. His lab established that humoral immunity could protect against intracellular pathogens, demonstrated that Cryptococcus neoformans was a facultative intracellular pathogen, and suggested that virulence in environmental fungi was selected by amoeba predators, a hypothesis dubbed "accidental virulence". Jointly with British biologist Robin May, his group were the first to observe non-lytic expulsion, or vomocytosis, of intracellular fungi. Subsequently, with Kirsten Nielsen at the University of Minnesota, he characterized the ability of cryptococci to form "giant" or "titan" cells in vivo, unusually large cells that help drive persistent infections. His lab continues to work on fungal and bacterial pathogenesis.

Together with Liise-anne Pirofski, he proposed the 'Damage-Response Framework' of microbial pathogenesis, a new synthesis that shifted the emphasis away from focusing on microbes as pathogens, commensals, opportunists to the outcome of host-pathogen interactions. The damage-response framework was the first theory of microbial pathogenesis to incorporate the contributions of both the host and the pathogen and refocused attention into the outcome of the interaction. From the view of the damage-response framework there are no pathogens, commensals, symbionts, etc., but only microbes and their hosts, which interact to produce the states of pathogenesis, commensalism, symbiosis, indifference, etc.

In addition, Casadevall, in collaboration with Dr. Ferric C. Fang, has been constructive in shaping the nations approach to science, scientific misconduct, and promotion of women and underrepresented minorities. Among his own trainees, nearly half are members of underrepresented minority groups and more than half are women. With a focus on American Society for Microbiology events, Casadevall has been active in creating gender balance among speakers at conferences. Along these lines, he stated: "When you have an underrepresentation of women as speakers and many panel discussions made up only of male researchers, you're sending the message that perhaps the field is not welcoming to women. That isn't the message we want to send." His research on scientific misconduct has focused on fraudulent results published in journals and the subsequent rates of retraction. In addition, his views on and analysis of topics ranging from problems with the funding pipeline to the rise in retractions in journals to the complex ethics of dual use research are widely sought by premier journals and media outlets.

In response to the COVID-19 pandemic, Casadevall was part of a national effort to investigate and expand the use of convalescent plasma, antibody-containing blood serum collected from patients who have recovered from the virus, as a measure to help until a COVID-19 vaccine becomes available. These antibodies are produced as part of the body's natural immune response, and bind to and neutralize the virus. A transfusion of blood containing these antibodies boosts the immunity of newly infected patients or people at risk of contracting the disease. Such infusions have been successfully implemented in past outbreaks, such as the SARS Epidemic, 1918 Flu Pandemic, and an outbreak of measles in 1934. The use of COVID-19 convalescent plasma for immunocompromised patients was found to be associated with a decrease in mortality.

Casadevall has written about the impact of climate change on fungal infections, especially fungal infections caused by the drug-resistant fungus Candida Auris, a species of fungus that grows as yeast. The fungus has spread through U.S. health care facilities and can cause severe illness in people with weakened immune systems. Casadevall has suggested that global warming could result in the emergence of new fungal diseases as natural selection could slowly increase heat tolerance in fungi to the point where they may be able to survive in human hosts.

== Publications ==
He has published more than 1,000 papers and 33 book chapters, largely in the fields of immunology and microbiology, genetics and molecular biology, biochemistry, and medicine, and more recently scientific culture and competition. As of early 2024, Casadevall has more than 90,000 citations in Google Scholar and an h-index of 157.

Books

- 2023, Thinking about Science: Good Science, Bad Science, and How to Make It Better. with co-author Ferric C. Fang, ASM Press.
- 2014, Human Fungal Pathogens. With co-editors A.P. Mitchell, J. Berman, KJ Kwon-Chung, J.R. Perfect, J. Heitman, Cold Spring Harbor Press.
- 2011, Recent Advances on Model Hosts. With co-editors E. Mylonakis, F.M. Ausubel, M. Gilmore, Springer Verlag/Springer Science & Business.
- 2011, Cryptococcus: from human pathogen to model yeast. with co-editors J. Heitman, T.R. Kozel, KJ Kwon-Chung, and JR Perfect, ASM Press.
- 1998, Cryptococcus neoformans. with co-author John R. Perfect, ASM Press.

Highly Cited Articles

- 2020, with Liise-anne Pirofski, The convalescent sera option for containing COVID-19, in: The Journal of Clinical Investigation. Vol. 130, nº 4; 1545–1548.
- 2015, with Lisa Brown, Julie M Wolf, Rafael Prados-Rosales, Through the wall: extracellular vesicles in Gram-positive bacteria, mycobacteria and fungi, in: Nature Reviews Microbiology. Vol. 13, nº 10; 620–630.
- 2012, with Ferric C Fang, R Grant Steen, Misconduct accounts for the majority of retracted scientific publications, in: Proceedings of the National Academy of Sciences. Vol. 109, nº 42; 17028–17033.
- 2003, with Joshua D Nosanchuk. The contribution of melanin to microbial pathogenesis , in: Cellular Microbiology. Vol. 5, nº 4; 203–223.
- 2002, with John R Perfect. Cryptococcosis, in: Infectious disease clinics of North America. Vol. 16, nº 4; 837–874.
- 2001, with JN Steenbergen and HA Shuman. Cryptococcus neoformans interactions with amoebae suggest an explanation for its virulence and intracellular pathogenic strategy in macrophages, in: Proceedings of the National Academy of Sciences. Vol. 98, nº 26; 15245–15250.
- 2000, with Gary M Cox, Jean Mukherjee, Garry T Cole, and John R Perfect. Urease as a virulence factor in experimental cryptococcosis, in: Infection and Immunity. Vol. 68, nº 2; 443–448.
- 1999, with Sarah P Franzot and Ira F Salkin. Cryptococcus neoformans var. grubii: separate varietal status for Cryptococcus neoformans serotype A isolates, in: Journal of Clinical Microbiology. Vol. 37, nº 3; 838–840.
- 1999, with Liise-anne Pirofski, Host-pathogen interactions: redefining the basic concepts of virulence and pathogenicity , in: Infection and Immunity. Vol. 67, nº 8; 3703–3713.
