= Practice (learning method) =

Action in learning

Practice is the act of rehearsing a behavior repeatedly, to help learn and eventually master a skill. Sessions scheduled for the purpose of rehearsing and performance improvement are called practices. They are engaged in by sports teams, bands, individuals, etc., as in, "He went to football practice every day after school".

In British English, practice is the noun and practise is the verb, but in American English it is now common for practice to be used both as a noun and a verb (see American and British English spelling differences; this article follows American conventions).

== Etymology ==
The word "practice" derives from the Greek "πρακτική" (praktike), feminine of "πρακτικός" (praktikos), "fit for or concerned with action, practical", and that from the verb "πράσσω" (prasso), "to achieve, bring about, effect, accomplish".

== Common types ==
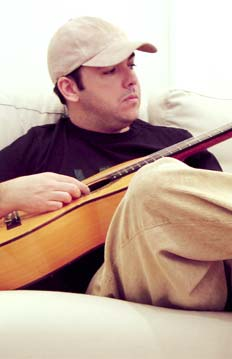
A musician practicing his instrument.

- To learn how to play a musical instrument (musical technique)
- To improve athletic or team performance
- To prepare for a public performance within the performing arts
- To improve reading, writing, interpersonal communication, typing, grammar, and spelling
- To enhance or refine a newly acquired skill
- To maintain skill
- To learn martial arts; kata and sparring are common forms of practice
- To master tasks associated with one's occupation (e.g. a cashier using a POS system)

How well one improves with practice depends on several factors, such as the frequency it is engaged in, and the type of feedback that is available for improvement. If feedback is not appropriate (either from an instructor or from self-reference to an information source), then the practice tends to be ineffective or even detrimental to learning. If a student does not practice often enough, reinforcement fades, and they are likely to forget what they learned. Therefore, practice is often scheduled, to ensure enough of it is performed to reach one's training objectives. How much practice is required depends upon the nature of the activity, and upon each individual. Some people improve on a particular activity faster than others. Practice in an instructional setting may be effective if repeated only 1 time (for some simple verbal information) or 3 times (for concepts), or it may be practiced many times before evaluation (a dance movement).

== Deliberate practice ==
Psychologist K. Anders Ericsson, a professor of Psychology at Florida State University, was a pioneer in researching deliberate practice and what it means. According to Ericsson:

People believe that because expert performance is qualitatively different from a normal performance the expert performer must be endowed with characteristics qualitatively different from those of normal adults. [...] We agree that expert performance is qualitatively different from normal performance and even that expert performers have characteristics and abilities that are qualitatively different from or at least outside the range of those of normal adults. However, we deny that these differences are immutable, that is, due to innate talent. Only a few exceptions, most notably height, are genetically prescribed. Instead, we argue that the differences between expert performers and normal adults reflect a life-long period of deliberate effort to improve performance in a specific domain.

One of Ericsson's core findings was that how expert one becomes at a skill has more to do with how one practices than with merely performing a skill a large number of times. An expert breaks down the skills that are required to be expert and focuses on improving those skill chunks during practice or day-to-day activities, often paired with immediate coaching feedback. Another important feature of deliberate practice lies in continually practicing a skill at more challenging levels with the intention of mastering it. Deliberate practice is also discussed in the books Talent is Overrated by Geoff Colvin, The Talent Code by Daniel Coyle, Grit: The Power of Passion and Perseverance, by Angela Duckworth, Outliers: The Story of Success, by Malcolm Gladwell, and Deliberate Practice for Psychotherapists, by Tony Rousmaniere.

Ericsson also believes that some anatomical characteristics were believed to be fixed traits in the past. Genes rarely dictate what traits will be. However, his study has proven that the characteristics have the ability to change and adapt in response to intense practice over multiple years. Ericsson's statements on practice also support the 10 year rule. Ericsson believes that elite performance is the product of maximal effort over at least a decade. The maximal effort is described as using deliberate practice in order to improve performance.

Duckworth describes how deliberate practice affects education, motivation, and learning outcomes. In a presentation she gave at the American Educational Research Conference in 2014, she spoke about the importance of grit – of students' focusing on material with which they struggle. In her view, grit allows a student to persevere and succeed in the face of adversity. Duckworth says that if a student can apply grit in their academic work, their effort will increase. Duckworth says that effort is equally important as talent in achieving academic goals. In a study she conducted at the National Spelling Bee in Washington, D.C, she found that the students who used the grit tactic tended to advance to the finals.

Two recent articles in Current Directions in Psychological Science criticize deliberate practice and argue that, while it is necessary for reaching high levels of performance, it is not sufficient, with other factors such as talent being important as well. More recently, a meta-analysis found the correlation coefficient between deliberate practice and performance was 0.40, the size of which is large compared to other predictor variables (e.g. obesity, excessive drinking, smoking, intelligence, adherence to effective medication). In addition, Malcolm Gladwell's point-of-view about deliberate practice is different from Ericsson's view: in a May 2016 Freakonomics podcast interview, he said, "He's [Ericsson] a hard practice guy, and I'm a soft practice guy." Gladwell claims that talent is important with an intentional dedication to practice and having a support system is vital to produce superior outcomes. It is not all about methodical effort as Ericsson claims. In Malcolm Gladwell's book, one chapter is called "The Matthew Effect."

This effect describes how different biases can affect an individual's performance. When someone is practising a skill, especially with deliberate practice, coaches play an important role in how their practices go. If a coach sets high expectations and encourages their learners, the individual is more likely to take more from practice and perform better. The role of coaches is important during deliberate practice. Coaches can strengthen desired behaviors through encouragement, positive reinforcement, and technical instruction. Fostering a positive learning environment through deliberate practice is key for all individuals involved. It is also important for coaches to lay out their practices with specific skill training, variable practice, and training of open and closed skills. These factors lead to an intentional, deliberate practice, which ultimately leads to better learning and performance.

According to the American Psychological Association, the purpose of deliberate practice is to achieve high levels of expert performance. Studies also show that due to deliberate practice, an individual will experience high achievement. This is due to memory, cognition, practice, persistence, and muscle response that all improves through deliberate practice.

=== Characteristics of deliberate practice ===
Practice changes the human body physically and psychologically as it increases in skill level. Skills that are learned through deliberate practice are specific and time spent practicing is crucial for the individual. If an individual spent a short amount of time with high intensity during practice, they are not as likely to succeed as an individual with a long-term commitment to the practice and skill.

According to Ericsson, a practice session needs to follow these criteria in order to be considered "deliberate":

1. The task should be well defined, with a clear goal, and should be completely understood by the student.
2. The student should be able to do the task by themself.
3. The student should be able to access immediate feedback about their performance, so they can make the changes needed to improve.
4. The student should be able to replicate the tasks or similar tasks repeatedly.
5. The task must be designed by a teacher and must be performed following a clear instruction by the teacher.

If the practice session follows all the criteria except for the last one, then, according to Ericsson, should be called "purposeful practice".

==== Deliberate practice versus physical preparation ====
Deliberate practice is not just any form of preparatory activity, but is defined as "highly structured activities that (a) are most relevant for improving performance, (b) are cognitively effortful, and (c) have no immediate rewards." There is a rise in discovering the differences within the details and connection between deliberate practice and physical preparation. Some researchers propose the idea that self regulated learning can help athletes overcome practice constraints. With this, athletes are more inclined to achieve and develop as an athlete. Ericsson wants to pursue a more detail oriented approach on how deliberate practice is measured and how it is different from other types of training.

==== Behavioral versus cognitive theories of deliberate practice ====
Behavioral theory would argue that deliberate practice is facilitated by feedback from an expert that allows for successful approximation of the target performance. Feedback from an expert allows the learner to minimize errors and frustration that results from trial-and-error attempts. Behavioral theory does not require delivery of rewards for accurate performance; the expert feedback in combination with the accurate performance serve as the consequences that establish and maintain the new performance.

In cognitive theory, excellent performance results from practicing complex tasks that produce errors. Such errors provide the learner with rich feedback that results in scaffolding for future performance. Cognitive theory explains how a learner can become an expert (or someone who has mastered a domain).

=== Applications of deliberate practice ===
==== Medical education ====
Deliberate practice is used in medical education. Duvivier et al. reconstructed the concept of deliberate practice into practical principles to describe the process as it relates to clinical skill acquisition. They defined deliberate practice as:

1. repetitive performance of intended cognitive or psychomotor skills.
2. rigorous skills assessment
3. specific information feedback
4. better skills performance

They further described the personal skills learners need to exhibit at various stages of skill development in order to be successful in developing their clinical skills. This includes:

1. planning (organize work in a structured way).
2. concentration/dedication (higher attention span)
3. repetition/revision (strong tendency to practice)
4. study style/self reflection (tendency to self-regulate learning)

While the study only included medical students, the authors found that repetitious practice may only help the novice learner (year 1) because as expertise is developed, the learner must focus and plan their learning around specific deficiencies. Curriculum must be designed to develop students' ability to plan their learning as they progress in their careers.

Finally, the findings in the study also have implications for developing self-regulated behaviors in students. Initially, a medical student may need focused feedback from instructors; however, as they progress, they must develop the ability to self-assess.

==== Therapeutic training ====
Deliberate practice is used in mental health education. More than 20 peer-reviewed empirical studies and two literature reviews have investigated the process and outcomes of deliberate practice in supervision. A 2024 review outlined two principal models of deliberate practice training for mental health professionals. The Better Results model, developed by Scott Miller, Mark Hubble, and Daryl Chow, leverages data from Feedback Informed Treatment to steer deliberate practice efforts. The Sentio Supervision Model, created by the Sentio University Marriage and Family Therapy program in California, combines psychotherapy skill rehearsal with clinical videos and outcome data.

== The 10,000 hour rule ==
Malcolm Gladwell defined and popularized the highly popular 10,000 hour rule. This rule states that if an individual spends 10,000 hours of full concentration and intense effort in their certain skill, they will become an expert at it.

However, Anders Ericsson's focuses on how the amount of time does not affect the elite status but how deliberate the practice is. Ericsson states "it is now quite clear that the number of hours of merely engaging in activities, such as playing music, chess and soccer, or engaging in professional work activities has a much lower benefit for improving performance than deliberate practice". In his work Peak , Ericsson pointed out Gladwell did not differentiate between deliberate and 'generic' practice, and the variance from 10,000 hour to reach mastery across different fields. Independent meta-analyses have estimated the share of performance variance associated with deliberate practice as considerably lower than the rule suggests. Macnamara, Hambrick and Oswald (2014) found that deliberate practice explained 26% of the variance in performance for games, 21% for music, 18% for sports, 4% for education, and less than 1% for professions, and concluded that deliberate practice is important but less important than has often been argued. A subsequent meta-analysis restricted to sports reported that deliberate practice accounted for 18% of the variance overall but only about 1% among elite-level performers, a result the authors described as inconsistent with the claim that deliberate practice explains performance differences among elite performers.

== Motivation ==
Learning is closely linked to practice and motivation. Sociocultural theory applied to motivation of practice suggests that motivation resides not within the individual, but within the domain of social and cultural contexts united by shared action and activity. Thus, motivation to practice is not simply within the locus of the individual (see Incentive theories: intrinsic and extrinsic motivation), but rather the locus is the activity and its specific contexts of which the individual is a participant.

Psychologist K. Anders Ericsson writes about motivation to practice. He creates a theoretical framework for acquisition of expert performance that discusses the issue of a lack of motivation to practice. He writes:

Engagement in deliberate practice is not inherently motivating. Performers consider it instrumental in achieving further improvements in performance (the motivational constraint). The lack of inherent reward or enjoyment in practice as distinct from the enjoyment of the result (improvement) is consistent with the fact that individuals in a domain rarely initiate practice spontaneously.

The motivational constraint, mentioned above, is important to consider as it is an important premise of Ericsson's theoretical framework for deliberate practice. He finds that because participating in deliberate practice is not motivating that individuals must be engaged and motivated to take part in improvement before deliberate practice can even take place. He talks about the success of children who were simply exposed to an activity for months by their parents in a fun way. These children displayed immense interest in continuing the activity, so the parents then began implanting deliberate practice. This came to be extremely successful, which Ericsson cites as proof that his theory works when put into action. He finds that children must have the passion to improve their skills before deliberate practice begins in order to really be successful.

== As maintenance ==
Skills fade with non-use. The phenomenon is often referred to as being "out of practice". Practice is therefore performed (on a regular basis) to keep skills and abilities honed. It is important to keep learners from reaching a burn out or exhaustion stage while learning and practicing. Spending a fair amount of time at practice is important when learning a new skill but taking time for mental and emotional health is just as important.

== See also ==
- Dreyfus model of skill acquisition – Model of learning
- Hebbian theory – Neuroscientific theory
- Homework – Educational practice
- Kata – Detailed choreographed patterns of movements in martial arts
- Learning – Process of acquiring new knowledge
- Muscle memory – Consolidating a motor task into memory through repetition
- Neuroplasticity – Ability of the brain to continuously change
- Physical exercise – Physical activity that improves health
- Praxis – Process by which a theory, lesson, or skill is enacted, embodied, or realized
- Procedural memory – Unconscious memory used to perform tasks
- Rehearsal – Practice performance
- Sparring – Type of training for combat sports
- Training – Acquisition of knowledge, skills, and competencies as a result of teaching or practice
