= Academic buoyancy =

Resilience relating to academic achievement

Academic buoyancy is a type of resilience relating specifically to academic attainment. It is defined as 'the ability of students to successfully deal with academic setbacks and challenges that are 'typical of the ordinary course of school life (e.g. poor grades, competing deadlines, exam pressure, difficult schoolwork)'. It is, therefore, related to traditional definitions of resilience but allows a narrower focus in order to target interventions more precisely. The academic buoyancy model was first proposed by psychologists Andrew Martin and Herbert W. Marsh, following the identification of significant differences between classic resilience (the ability to thrive despite the experience of severe adversity) and the day-to-day setbacks experienced by students.

It has been recently extended and adapted through the work and writings of British psychologist Marc Smith

More specifically academic buoyancy is defined as 'the process of dealing with isolated poor grades and patches of poor performance, typical stress levels and daily pressures, threats to confidence due to poor grades, low-level stress and confidence, dips in motivation and engagement and the way in which learners deal with negative feedback on schoolwork'.

== Basic theory ==
The model of academic buoyancy assumes that academic attainment is, in part, related to the ability to cope with school-based demands and to bounce back when setbacks are encountered. Smith likens the differences between resilience and academic buoyancy to those of major stressors and daily hassles. To this end, certain personal attributes have been found to be present in those students who are more likely to flourish in educational environments. These attributes (or predictors of academic buoyancy) are referred to as the 5Cs.

The 5Cs

Martin and Marsh identified five predictors of academic buoyancy, referred to as the 5Cs, consisting of:

1. Confidence (self-efficacy)

The belief in our ability to complete a given task. 5C confidence is task specific.

2. Coordination (planning)

The ability to set and pursue goals, plan, monitor and manage tasks within a specific timeframe (e.g. meeting deadlines and allocating study time to competing tasks).

3. Control (low uncertain control)

The extent to which people feel they are in control of the own learning, including the manner in which they attribute the causes of success and failure.

4. Composure (low anxiety)

The extent to which people can remain relatively calm in potentially anxiety provoking situation (e.g examination environments). Students prone to high levels of anxiety have been found to perform poorly in high stakes exams and to have increased difficulty in coping with setbacks.

5. Commitment (persistence or conscientiousness)

The ability to stay on task, resist distractions, act on feedback and recover from setbacks.

== Academic buoyancy and attainment ==
The positive outcomes of academic buoyancy are linked to the 5Cs. Commitment is synonymous with Big Five conscientiousness (a personality trait), as well as newer constructs such as grit. Studies consistently find that conscientious students have a higher Grade Point Average (GPA). Duckworth's studies have also discovered that grit is a trait found in a number of highly effective people, including West Point candidates and skilled spelling bee participants. Composure is a factor related to anxiety and the ability to regulate emotional reactions (trait neuroticism-emotional stability).

== Resilience interventions in schools ==
Smith has been critical of current resilience interventions in schools, citing reviews that found methodological and practical flaws.

Dray et al. found that resilience interventions are relatively messy, with mixed results, varying techniques, competing definitions and little in the way of defined outcomes.

Leppin et al. had previously found a similar pattern of mixed results, along with a distinct lack of any agreed theoretical framework.

Smith has proposed that schools move away from the traditional view of resilience and adopt a view that is focussed wholly on academic buoyancy.

== Criticisms ==
Professor Angie Hart of the University of Brighton, UK, has stated that an academic buoyancy approach can never do as much for children as 'a resilience perspective that addresses systems, and issues of social justice, will do.' Hart addresses the importance of systems and structures as well as the building of 'character' and 'grit'. In response to these criticisms, Smith stresses that there is no reason why buoyancy interventions can not be used in unison or in parallel with those aimed at increasing wellbeing and reducing inequalities, leading Smith to propose the addition of a 6th C - Community.
