= Smoller =

Smoller is a surname. Notable people with this surname include:

- Dorothy Smoller (c. 1898 – 1926), American actress
- Fred Smoller, political science professor who made a video about American politician Steve Rocco
- Joel Smoller (1936–2017), American mathematician
- Jordan Smoller (born 1961), American psychiatric geneticist
- Sylvia Wassertheil-Smoller (born 1932), American epidemiologist and mother of Jordan
