= Grit (personality trait) =

Psychological concept

In psychology, grit is a positive, non-cognitive trait based on a person's perseverance of effort combined with their passion for a particular long-term goal or end state (a powerful motivation to achieve an objective). This perseverance of effort helps people overcome obstacles or challenges to accomplishment and drives people to achieve.

Distinct but commonly associated concepts within the field of psychology include perseverance, hardiness, resilience, ambition, need for achievement, conscientiousness, and tenacity. These constructs can be conceptualized as individual differences related to the accomplishment of work rather than as talent or ability. This distinction was brought into focus in 1907 when William James challenged psychology to further investigate how certain people can access richer trait reservoirs that enable them to accomplish more than the average person. However, the construct of grit dates back at least to Francis Galton, and the ideals of persistence and tenacity have been understood as a virtue at least since Aristotle.

== Definition ==
Grit was defined as "perseverance and passion for long-term goals" by psychologist Angela Duckworth and colleagues, who extensively studied grit as a personality trait. They observed that people high in grit were able to maintain their determination and motivation over long periods despite experiences with failure and adversity. They concluded that grit is a better predictor of success than intellectual talent (IQ), based on their evaluation of educational attainment by adults; GPA among Ivy League undergraduates; dropout rate of cadets at West Point US Military Academy; and ranking in the National Spelling Bee.

Earlier studies of achievement often emphasized the notion that high-achieving people typically possess traits above and beyond that of normal ability. Duckworth et al. emphasized that grit is a better predictor of achievement than intellectual talent (IQ), because grit provides the stamina required to "stay the course" amid challenges and setbacks.

Marcus Crede and colleagues later observed that the contribution of grit to the prediction of success mostly stems from the perseverance of effort, and they questioned the inclusion of consistency of interest (passion) as one of the aspects of grit, as defined by Duckworth et al.

== Positive psychology ==
Grit ties in with positive psychology and in particular, with its promotion of perseverance: the ability to stick with and pursue a goal over a long period is an aspect of grit. This area of positive psychology considers perseverance as a positive indicator of long-term success. One study found that individual differences in grit and its two component facets (perseverance of effort and consistency of interests over time) may derive in part from differences in what makes people happy.

Grit is closely linked to resilience within the field of positive psychology. Individuals with higher levels of grit are able to bounce back from set backs more quickly due to a positive mindset. Grit highlights perseverance in working towards lifelong goals. These individuals tend to experience more success and demonstrate a more sustained effort over longer periods of time.

== Intelligence ==
One of the best predictors of future achievement has been intelligence. This relationship has been found in scholastic achievement as well as in job performance. As such, one might expect that grit would be strongly correlated with intelligence. This prompted an early question of grit research: "Why do some individuals accomplish more than others of equal intelligence?". Somewhat surprisingly, in four separate samples, grit was found to be either orthogonal to or slightly inversely correlated with intelligence. This means that grit, unlike many traditional measures of performance, is not tied to intelligence. The researchers suggested that this helps explain why some very intelligent people do not consistently perform well over long periods.

== Personality measure ==
The grit measure has been compared to the Big Five personality traits, which are a group of broad personality dimensions consisting of openness to experience, conscientiousness, extraversion, agreeableness, and neuroticism. In one study, the Short Grit Scale (Grit–S) and 12-item self-report measure of grit (Grit–O) measuring grit were strongly correlated with conscientiousness (r = 0.77, p < 0.001 and r = 0.73, p < 0.001). A large study of twins measuring both conscientiousness and grit found that they had a genetic correlation of 0.86. A subsequent meta-analysis found that grit was functionally a measure of conscientiousness. Despite these high correlations with conscientiousness, it is suggested that grit is more strongly associated with longer term and multi-year goals such as education. Large studies suggest only weak links of grit to these long-term goals, much smaller than links to IQ and to conscientiousness. Grit is also similar to need for achievement, but is suggested to relate to extremely long-term goals pursued without positive feedback, while need for achievement is suggested to lack this long-term component.

Grit may be domain-specific rather than a domain-general trait. One prolific area of research looked at its role in second language learning or L2 grit. Grit is not only domain-specific, but also context-dependent, with its predictors differing in face-to-face vs. online learning contexts.

== Related psychological constructs ==
Traditional constructs in this area include perseverance, hardiness, resilience, ambition, self-control, and need for achievement. Grit has been argued to be distinguishable from each of these in the following ways.

perseverance
Perseverance is the steadfast pursuit of a task, mission, or journey in spite of obstacles, discouragement, or distraction. In contrast, grit is argued to be a trait of perseverance. Grit enables a person to persevere in accomplishing a goal despite obstacles over an extended period. When compared with the construct of persistence, grit adds the component of passion for the goal. This goal-passion contributes to the ability of the person to sustain effort over the long term.

hardiness
Salvatore Maddi defined hardiness as a combination of attitudes that provide the courage and motivation to do the hard, strategic work of turning stressful circumstances from potential disasters into growth opportunities. While grit is primarily a measure of a person's ability to persist in obtaining a specific goal over an extended time period, hardiness refers to a person's ability to persist through difficult circumstances and does not address the person's long term persistence toward a specific goal. Maddi developed a theoretical model of hardiness as a tool for developing resilience.

resilience
Resilience is a process in which a person overcomes significant adversity, usually in the form of a life-changing event or difficult personal circumstances. Resilience is an adaptive response to a challenging situation. Grit involves maintaining goal-focused effort for extended periods of time, often while facing adversity, but it does not require a critical incident. Importantly, grit is conceptualized as a trait while resilience is a process. Finally, resilience has been almost exclusively studied in children who are born into "at-risk" situations. Although resilience researchers recognize that adults likely demonstrate resilience in a similar manner to children, as of 1996 the resilience process has not been studied in a mature population.

ambition
Ambition is the desire for attainment, power, or superiority. In contrast to ambition, grit is not associated with seeking fame or external recognition for achievements. Ambition is often associated with a desire for fame. Unlike ambitious people, gritty people do not seek to distinguish themselves from others, but to achieve personal goals. Grit has also been linked to a decrease in burnout, an increase in performance, and even minimized depression. These positive side effects of grit can be attributed to psychological devices that limit harmful effects by replacing them with cognitive process that promote productivity and achievement.

self-control
An aspect of inhibitory control, self-control is the ability to control one's emotions and behavior in the face of temptations and impulses. Duckworth and James Gross used a hierarchical-goal perspective on self-control and grit to show that while both of these constructs entail aligning actions with intentions, they operate in different ways and over different timescales and are distinct psychological mechanisms that are key determinants of success.

need for achievement
David McClelland described need for achievement as a drive to complete manageable goals that enable the person to receive immediate feedback. In contrast to need for achievement, gritty people consciously set long-term goals that are difficult to attain and do not waver from these difficult goals, regardless of the presence of feedback. Need for achievement has been studied for almost 50 years and has been found to positively correlate to self-efficacy and learning goal orientation. These links have not yet been tested in the grit literature.

== Scientific findings and controversy ==
The primary scientific findings on grit come from Duckworth and colleagues' 2007 examination of grit as an individual difference trait capable of predicting long-term success. A subsequent meta-analysis of the structure and correlates of grit questioned Duckworth's construct of grit (that included both the perseverance of effort facet and the consistency of interest facet), concluding that the primary utility of the grit construct may stem from the perseverance of effort.

Duckworth initially proposed that people with a drive to tirelessly work through challenges, failures, and adversity to achieve set goals are better positioned to reach higher achievements than people who lack similar stamina. In a series of six studies Duckworth et al. proposed, developed, and tested a two-factor grit scale. In addition to validating their grit scale, the authors also found

- that grit provided incremental predictive validity for education and age above and beyond the Big Five personality traits
- that higher levels of grit were more highly associated with cumulative grade point average (GPA) in an Ivy league sample when compared to those with lower grit levels (r = 0.25, p < 0.01)
- that grit predicted retention after their first summer in two classes of cadets at the United States Military Academy
- that participants in a National Spelling Bee with higher grit scores typically work harder and longer than less gritty peers, ultimately resulting in better performance.

This series of studies provides empirical evidence that an individual difference conceptualized as grit can account for significant variance in performance across a variety of settings.

Although Duckworth argued that grit predicted academic performance better than the Big Five personality traits, that claim was later called into question by Kaili Rimfeld and colleagues, who argued that Big Five personality factors have equal predictive ability, and by Crede, who concluded that grit is very strongly correlated with conscientiousness, and that after controlling for conscientiousness, only one component of grit (perseverance of effort) explains variance in academic performance.

The largest study of grit in the United Kingdom, based on academic achievement of 2,321 twin pairs (U.K.-representative sample and genetically sensitive design), compared the predictive ability of grit as a trait (measured by the Grit-S) to the predictions based on Big Five personality traits. It found that while personality is a significant predictor of academic achievement, grit as a separate construct added little to the prediction of academic achievement derived from Big Five personality factors, such as conscientiousness.

A meta-analytic synthesis of empirical research on grit summarized data from 88 independent samples and over 66,000 people, and found that grit is only moderately correlated with performance, and that only one component of grit (perseverance of effort) explains variance in academic performance. The study consequently suggested to separate consistency of interest (passion) from perseverance (effort), since the contribution of grit to the prediction of success mostly stems from the perseverance facet.

Psychologist K. Anders Ericsson, in his book Peak: Secrets from the New Science of Expertise, criticized the tendency to credit persistent practice to traits such as grit or willpower. He wrote: "It may seem natural to assume that these people who maintain intense practice schedules for years have some rare gift of willpower or 'grit' or 'stick-to-itiveness' that the rest of us just lack, but that would be a mistake for two very compelling reasons." The first reason is that motivation is a situation-specific attribute: People generally find it easier to practice in some areas than in others. The second reason is that grit and willpower are traits that are assigned to someone after the fact—for example: John practiced persistently for years, so he must have incredible grit. But, Ericsson explained: "This sort of circular thinking—'The fact that I couldn't keep practicing indicates that I don't have enough willpower, which explains why I couldn't keep practicing'—is worse than useless; it is damaging in that it can convince people that they might as well not even try." Instead of attributing success to grit or willpower, Ericsson recommended analyzing the various factors that shape a person's motivation in a given situation.

Since 2014, grit has been the subject of critical commentary and debate in Education Week, with contributors discussing the strengths and weaknesses of how the idea of grit has been used by educators. Some contributors called "the grit narrative" a kind of victim blaming when educators who emphasize grit downplay the obstacles that some students face such as conditions of poverty, racism, and ineffective teaching.

The idea that grit can be enhanced was also criticized.

A meta-analysis found that overall grit/2 facets is cross-culturally related to academic achievement. However, the level of persistency and grit may vary among people of different cultures.

A study completed by Müge Akbağ and Durmuş Ümmet examined the role of gender in terms of grit as well as the satisfaction of psychological needs and subjective well-being. Akbağ and Ümmet found that female psychological need satisfaction was on average higher than those of males. The predictive role of grit was found to be linked to that of psychological need satisfaction in that when there was a higher level of satisfaction there was an increased level of personal grit as well. With this being said, there may be levels of variance depending on social and cultural situations as well.

== See also ==
- Delayed gratification – Resistance of an immediate reward in return for a greater reward later
- Patience – Ability to endure difficult circumstances
- Prudence – Ability of a person to regulate itself with the use of reason
- Self-control – Aspect of inhibitory control
- Sisu – Finnish concept
- Temperance (virtue) – Cardinal virtue of control over excess
- What does not kill me makes me stronger – Aphorism of Friedrich Nietzsche
