= Range: Why Generalists Triumph in a Specialized World =

2019 nonfiction book

- First edition
- Author: David Epstein
- Language: English
- Publisher: Riverhead Books (US); Macmillan (UK)
- Publication date: 2019
- Publication place: United States
- Pages: 339
- ISBN: 978-1-5098-4349-7

Range: Why Generalists Triumph in a Specialized World is a 2019 book by David Epstein, in which he expands on the points from his previous book The Sports Gene: Inside the Science of Extraordinary Athletic Performance to make a more general argument against overspecialization. In the book, he argues that range – defined as more diverse experience across multiple fields – is more relevant in today's society than specialization because the wicked problems of the modern world require bridging experience and knowledge from multiple fields to foster solutions. Range was a #1 New York Times best seller.

== Content ==
Epstein's basic argument is that focus on early specialization is unwarranted. Starting in the world of sports he contrasts Tiger Woods (who specialized early as a golfer) with Roger Federer (who played numerous sports, including tennis, before specializing only on tennis later than many of his peers) and argues that when he looks more broadly at successful people, they "seemed to have more Roger than Tiger in their development stories". Epstein then argues that while specialization is useful for the kinds of problems found in closed predictable environments like chess, or music performance, the modern world is characterized by wicked problems, that may not be solvable. As he puts it: "And that is what a rapidly changing, wicked world demands – conceptual reasoning skill that can connect new ideas and work across contexts". He then expands on this general idea to argue that range, combining knowledge and experience from multiple fields and late specialization is a better focus than early specialization. Some critics, including Jim Holt and Nicole Smartt Serres, see the argument as a response to Malcolm Gladwell's popularization of the 10,000-Hour Rule that argues for early specialization, which itself is based on the work of K. Anders Ericsson.

== Reception ==
The book received a positive review in The New York Times that wrote: "Although the book unfolds according to a formula that has become familiar—story, study, lesson; rinse and repeat—the storytelling is so dramatic, the wielding of data so deft and the lessons so strikingly framed that it's never less than a pleasure to read". The book was also shortlisted (as one of six books) for the McKinsey and Financial Times Business Book of the Year Award.
