= Inkwell Management =

American literary agency

Inkwell Management is a New York City-based literary agency formed in 2004 from the merger of the three boutique agencies Arthur Pine Associates, Witherspoon Associates, and Carlisle & Company. Its agents manage rights to books including adult fiction and nonfiction, children's literature, and cookbooks, and represent authors including Angela Duckworth, Anthony Bourdain, Andre Agassi, Elin Hilderbrand, Yotam Ottolenghi, and Mahmoud Khalil.
