= Peak: Secrets from the New Science of Expertise =

2016 book by K. Anders Ericsson

- First edition (US)
- Author: K. Anders Ericsson, Robert Pool
- Language: English
- Genre: Science, non-fiction, psychology
- Published: 2016
- Publisher: Eamon Dolan/HMH (US); Bodley Head (UK)
- Publication place: United States
- ISBN: 978-0544456235

Peak: Secrets from the New Science of Expertise is a 2016 science book by psychologist K. Anders Ericsson and science writer Robert Pool. The book summarizes the findings of Ericsson's 30-year research into the general nature and acquisition of expertise.

Intended for a lay audience, Peak is an expository book on deliberate practice, a term coined by Ericsson to refer to the specific learning method used by experts to achieve superior performance in their fields, and mental representations. The book was written partly as a response to the misrepresented but increasingly commonplace idea of the "10,000-hour rule," popularized by Malcolm Gladwell in his 2008 book Outliers and which Gladwell had based on Ericsson's own research. In this regard, Ericsson also published an excerpt from this book in Salon titled "Malcolm Gladwell got us wrong: Our research was key to the 10,000-hour rule, but here’s what got oversimplified".

A website dedicated to the book was launched in 2016.

== Overview ==
The central theme of this book is the concept of deliberate practice, and the authors spend a significant part of the book laying out the differences between deliberate practice and related types of practice, such as purposeful practice, another highly efficient method of learning. Key to these discussions is the idea of mental representations, which are an encoding of external reality within the physiology of neurons. Strong mental representations are regarded by the authors as the essential component of expertise and superior performance in general, and consequently, very little time is wasted on discussions about intelligence quotient or the nature-versus-nurture debate. Since mental representations are acquired throughout the life of an individual, they can be learned. Deliberate practice thus sets out to study and enlist the principles of the kind of learning that produces strong, refined mental representations.

== Reception ==
Kirkus Reviews writes that “The author makes a strong case that success in today's world requires a focus on practical performance, not just the accumulation of information.” The review also praises the author for including “intriguing examples” and concludes that the book is “Especially informative for parents and educators in preparing children for the challenges ahead.”

Daniel Wahl, writing for The Objective Standard, agrees with Kirkus’s praise, concluding that Peak is “a valuable addition to the popular literature on deliberate practice. It provides new insights into what deliberate practice is, along with how to apply it, and it is thus a good book for anyone interested in becoming much better at what he does.”

Dr. John McGowan gave the book a mostly positive review, writing that “Peak is clear, well-written, and easy to read. It is an accessible overview of Ericsson’s research and his theories of expert and peak performance with citations to scholarly papers and sources in the detailed end notes.” However, he criticizes the “vague, shifting definition of ‘deliberate practice.’”
