= Object skill =

Object Skill is the kind of skill that helps humans and animals accelerate the speed of finding certain desirable objects, thereby reducing the reward delay in this process. Along with action skill, it is an essential component of any reward-directed skills.

== Value of object skill ==
Evolutionarily speaking, more rewards per unit time would mean better chance of survival and success to both humans and animals. In order to speed up reward-oriented behaviors and thereby maximizing rewards per unit time, humans and animals mainly rely on two mechanisms. They either boost up their motivation for certain behaviors or acquire skills of these behaviors. While motivation can be initiated quickly at presence of rewards and thus has an advantage of flexibility, it tends to fade away quickly without rewards. Skill, on the other hand, appears to be much more effective in reducing the duration of target behaviors and has a stable effect even when no short-term reward is expected at all. This kind of reward-oriented skill is made up with two parts: finding an object and acting on it, the former being object skill and the latter action skill. Therefore, object skill is crucial in helping humans and animals maximizing their chance of survival and success.

== Characteristics of object skill ==
Object skill is usually distinctly characterized by several features, including relatively stable internal value assignment, gaze and attention bias towards desired objects, automaticity of response towards desired objects, dependence on high-capacity memory and long-term nature of its effect.

=== Stable internal value assignment ===
In everyday life, people learn values of objects according to the corresponding rewarding or punishing results of choosing these objects. Their ability of finding good objects therefore depends on this kind of value-based learning, where consistency plays an important role. As a result of this comparatively consistent object-value mapping across people's lifespan, their internal value assignment to objects tends to be stable.

=== Gaze and attention bias ===
Both humans and animals use senses across different modalities to find objects; however, humans mainly rely on visual information to identify objects. Studies have shown that gaze or attention shift to desired objects always precedes any possible manual action performed on these objects. Remarkably, this gaze or attention shift occurs regardless of current intention of the initiator. This automatic gaze or attention shift is pronounced even when no reward is expected, potentially increasing the subject's chance of survival in some critical circumstances.

=== Automaticity of response ===
Studies have shown that when humans have extensively learned to find some particular objects, they start to recruit much less cognitive resource in order to finish the task. A study on monkeys with free-viewing procedure for testing gaze shift bias has also provided evidence to support the involuntary nature of object skill. According to this study, monkeys neatly fixed their gazes only at objects with higher values learned in previous training. This seems rather implausible to be accomplished through voluntary searching mechanism, given the limited space of working memory. On the other hand, faster responsivity of automatic search over voluntary search seems to be as well favored in terms of maximizing amount of reward per time unit. Thus, automaticity of response also plays a vital part in object skill.

=== Dependence on high-capacity memory ===
Just like any other skills, two aspects of object skill matter most: accuracy and speed. Accuracy is assured only if every memory-motor connection is unique, and speed is assured only if object-value information is quickly transmitted through memory-motor connections. Under such scheme, high-capacity memory seems to be a necessity in response to demand for distinct memory slots for every object-value association.

=== Long-term nature of effect ===
Object skill also tends to have a long-term effect over object perception of both humans and monkeys. Results of several studies have shown that both humans and monkeys maintain their value-based gaze bias for a long time after the initial acquisition of such bias during training. Another study on monkeys looked specifically at monkeys' response to objects very similar to ones associated with high values learned during training. The results showed that monkeys were highly responsive only to objects with high values as learned in the past, suggesting a highly object-selective object-value memory, which provides evidence for object skill's dependence of high-capacity memory. And since high-capacity memory could be created only if each memory had been retained for a long time, it is now fairly clear that object skill could only be created slowly and would remain stable once created.

== Limitations of object skill ==
Due to its automatic and inflexible nature, object skill can be detrimental when changes happen. When values of objects change from positive to negative, quick motor response associated with object skill still occurs and might thus undermine the subject. Object skill also tends to account for the case of drug abuse, where abusers can't help but associate substances with high values as a result of their previous experience, even knowing the danger of abusing drugs. One of the possible solutions involves recruiting another system that pays attention to changes in object values. Such a system would be voluntary and slow, but the expense of maintaining this system could be compensated by avoiding potential costly dangers. The core issue then would be to figure out an optimal balance between relying on object skill and referring to local changes.

== See also ==
- Action selection
- Intelligent agent
