= High-performance sport =

High performance sport or elite sport is sport at the highest level of competition.

In sports administration, "high-performance sport", where the emphasis is on winning prestigious competitions, is distinguished from "mass sport" or "recreational sport", where the emphasis is on attracting the maximum number of participants. In team sports, the concept of high performance involves also team performance strategy and assessment.

High-performance sport overlaps with the upper tiers of professional sport; within the realm of professional sport, the elite tiers of the sport are known, particularly in North America, as major leagues. On the other hand, elite competitors at the Olympic Games or World Games in some minority sports may be part-time or rely on government grants. Likewise, student athletes, especially in college sports, are often high performance despite being nominally amateurs.

Much research in sports psychology and sports medicine is motivated by the needs of elite rather than mass athletes. Doping in sport is more common at elite levels, and research into performance-enhancing substances has been fuelled by the drive for success, this despite the practice being firmly illegal at almost all levels of play.

Separate state agencies may be responsible for high-performance sport and for mass sport; national governing bodies for a particular sport often have separate administrative units for supporting elite athletes and the funding of athletes likely to win Olympic medals. In public policy, funding for high-performance sport may be justified for reasons of national prestige or as a marketing tool for encouraging mass sport. Eastern Bloc countries invested in elite sport during the Cold War for propaganda purposes; some Western countries began establishing Institutes of Sport from the 1980s, with sports academies for nurturing promising young athletes.

== See also ==
- Professional sports
- Semi-professional sports
- The Sports Gene – Book by David Epstein
