= MBio =

Scientific journal of microbiology

mBio
- Discipline: Microbiology
- Language: English
- Edited by: Marvin Whiteley

Publication details
- History: 2010–present
- Publisher: American Society for Microbiology in association with the American Academy of Microbiology
- Frequency: Bimonthly
- Open access: Yes
- License: CC-BY 4.0
- Impact factor: 5.4 (2025)

Standard abbreviations
- ISO 4: mBio

Indexing
- CODEN: MBIOCL
- ISSN: 2150-7511
- LCCN: 2011205834
- OCLC no.: 969766323

Links
- Journal homepage; Online access; Online archive

mBio is a bimonthly peer-reviewed open access scientific journal published by the American Society for Microbiology in association with the American Academy of Microbiology. The journal covers topics from all aspects of the microbiological sciences, including virology, bacteriology, parasitology, mycology, and allied fields.

The journal was established in 2010 with Arturo Casadevall as founding editor-in-chief. As of 2025, the editor-in-chief is Marvin Whiteley (Georgia Institute of Technology).

== Abstracting and indexing ==
The journal is abstracted and indexed in:

- BIOSIS Previews
- Chemical Abstracts Service
- Index Medicus/MEDLINE/PubMed
- ProQuest databases
- Science Citation Index Expanded
- Scopus

According to the Journal Citation Reports, the journal has a 2025 impact factor of 5.4.
