= Lynda Chin =

Chinese-American medical doctor

- Born: Lynda Chin; 01/02/1968; China
- Education: Brown University Albert Einstein College of Medicine (M.D, 1993)
- Spouse: Ronald DePinho
- Children: 3
- Scientific career
- Workplaces: University of Texas MD Anderson Cancer Center

Lynda Chin (born 1968) is a Chinese-American medical doctor. She is a board-certified dermatologist who was the founding department chair and professor of genomic medicine at the University of Texas MD Anderson Cancer Center, as well as scientific director of the MD Anderson Institute for Applied Cancer Science. In late 2012 she was elected as a member of the Institute of Medicine (IOM) of the National Academies.

== Early life and education ==
When she was 15, Chin and her family migrated from Guangzhou, China to the United States. She then attended Franklin D. Roosevelt High School where 1984, she was valedictorian of her class. In 1988, Chin graduated from Brown University, receiving magna cum laude honors for her B.S in neuroscience. She earned her medical degree from Albert Einstein College of Medicine in 1993. Afterward, she began her postgraduate clinical and scientific training at New York–Presbyterian Hospital in New York City. From 1994 to 1997, Chin completed her research fellowship from Albert Einstein College of Medicine where she was also chief resident of dermatology.

== Career ==
=== Dana–Farber Cancer Institute ===
Chin was a member of the Dana–Farber Cancer Institute's Department of Medical Oncology from 1999 until joining the University of Texas MD Anderson Cancer Center in 2011.

=== Educator and researcher ===
She was a professor of Dermatology at the Harvard Medical School.

Chin was a Senior Associate Member of the Broad Institute, where she became the principal researcher of the Genome Data Analysis Center in The Cancer Genome Atlas (TCGA). Chin was then elected scientific director of the Belfer Institute for Applied Cancer Science at the Dana–Farber Cancer Institute. Chin was a co-leader of the Dana-Farber/Harvard Cancer Center's Melanoma Program and the Specialized Programs of Research Excellence (SPORE) grant for skin research.

=== AVEO Pharmaceuticals and Metamark Genetics ===
In 2002, Chin co-founded a cancer biotechnology company called AVEO Pharmaceuticals. 5 years later, Chin founded Metamark Genetics, a cancer diagnostic company dedicated to the development of prognostic and predictive cancer tests.

=== University of Texas MD Anderson Cancer Center ===
Chin joined the University of Texas MD Anderson Cancer Center in 2011 as chair of first-ever Department of Genomic Medicine and scientific director of the Institute for Applied Cancer Science. She assists the scientific steering committee of the International Cancer Genome Consortium.

In 2012, Chin was involved in controversial grant award by the Cancer Prevention and Research Institute of Texas (CPRIT). A Houston Chronicle investigation suggests that CPRIT her application for the approximately $18 million grant had been handled in a hasty manner designed to circumvent its own scientific reviewers.

She is a recipient of the 2014 Lila and Murray Gruber Memorial Cancer Research Award.

== Personal life ==
Chin met her husband, Ronald A. DePinho, as a medical student at Albert Einstein College of Medicine in New York City. Chin and her husband have three children together.
