= Matthew Scharff =

Matthew D. Scharff is an American medical doctor and immunologist who is currently a Distinguished University Professor Emeritus at the Albert Einstein College of Medicine. His research is focused on studying class-switch recombination in mice as well as identifying factors crucial for how mutation is targeted to antibody genes and some oncogenes in human Burkitt's lymphoma cell lines which are undergoing variable region mutation in culture. He has been a member of the National Academy of Sciences since 1982.

== Early life and education ==
He was born to a poor Jewish immigrant family of Russian and German origin in New York City. His mother was a schoolteacher and his father was a salesman. He attended public and private schools before attending Brown University for undergraduate studies where he majored in English for two and a half years before switching to biology after getting interested in it through taking biology courses. He graduated from college in 1954 and subsequently attended the New York University School of Medicine from which he graduated in 1959.
