= Luz Claudio =

American medical researcher

Luz Claudio is an American medical researcher. She is best known for her research on asthma in low income communities. Dr. Luz Claudio balances a research focus on preventive medicine with leadership in community outreach, education, and training of students and postdoctoral fellows for successful careers in research.

== Early life ==
She was born in Puerto Rico where she studied biology at the University of Puerto Rico. Upon finishing her studies, Claudio moved to New York City where she earned a Doctorate of Philosophy in neuropathology from Albert Einstein College of Medicine in New York. She then obtained a fellowship from the American Association for the Advancement of Science to create neurotoxicity testing protocols at the Environmental Protection Agency. In 1991 Claudio joined Mount Sinai School of Medicine as Director of Community Outreach and Education in the Preventive Medicine department.

== Awards and recognition ==
Claudio has received numerous honors and awards for her work, including the Robert C. Barnard Award from the Environmental Protection Agency in 1990, an Environmental Science and Engineering Fellowship from the American Association for the Advancement of Science, and the Outstanding Research in Health and Safety Award from New York Laborer’s Research Foundation. She was also awarded the National Environmental Education Achievement Award, the Outstanding Woman Scientist Award, and Mentor Award of the Year from the National Environmental Education and Training Foundation, the New York Academy of Sciences, and the American Association for the Advancement of Science.

== Work with asthma in New York City ==
Claudio’s work in mapping and documenting asthma hospitalization rates in New York City has had a significant role in bringing attention to disadvantaged communities that have been most heavily impacted by the disease. The investigation showed that asthma hospitalization rates were 21 times higher in low-income neighborhoods with high concentrations of minorities as compared to more affluent neighborhoods. This information provided communities with evidence to support implementation of preventive strategies focused on the neighborhoods that need them most. Claudio worked as a liaison between community leaders, academics and industry to address the health effects of environmental pollution, bridging the gap between scientific experts and community leaders.

== Training and education ==
Claudio devotes a significant portion of her time to training students and postdoctoral fellows to succeed in science and medicine. She has mentored over 120 students and post-doctoral fellows. In 2003 she was highlighted in the book, “Science in the Private Interest” by Sheldon Krimsky as an example of scientists working in the public interest.

Claudio’s work is currently supported by grants from the National Institutes of Health and previous grant funding from Ford Foundation and New York State Assembly

== Publication ==
In April 2016 Claudio published a book titled "How to Write and Publish a Scientific Paper: A Step-by-Step Guide".
