= Jil C. Tardiff =

American cardiologist

- Born: California, USA

Academic background
- Education: BA, Genetics, 1984 University of California, Berkeley; MD, PhD, Cell Biology, 1992, Albert Einstein College of Medicine
- Thesis: The Transcriptional control of œı-proteinase inhibitor expression in mouse liver and macrophages

Jil Caryn Tardiff is an American cardiologist. She is the Steven M. Gootter Endowed Chair for the Prevention of Sudden Cardiac Death and Vice Chair for Research at the University of Arizona College of Medicine – Tucson.

== Early life and education ==
Tardiff earned her Bachelor of Arts degree from the University of California, Berkeley (UC Berkeley) before traveling to New York City to enroll at the Albert Einstein College of Medicine for her medical degree and PhD in cell biology. She originally enrolled at UC Berkeley with the intention to major in English and pre-med studies but changed her mind after attending a lecture on the relative resistance to malaria. Upon completing her degrees, she did her internal medicine residency at the Columbia-Presbyterian Medical Center. During her training, she encountered a patient with hypertrophic cardiomyopathy which sparked her interest in cardiac thin filament. She also spent the following weeks visiting R. John Solaro’s lab at the University of Illinois College of Medicine before deciding to research biophysicists.

== Career ==
Tardiff joined the faculty at her alma mater, Albert Einstein College of Medicine, in 2001 as an assistant professor of medicine and physiology and biophysics. During her tenure at the institution, she studied the basic molecular mechanisms that underlie the pathogenesis of cardiomyopathies caused by mutations in the cardiac thin filament in her lab. She stayed there until 2012 when she accepted an endowed chair position at the University of Arizona College of Medicine – Tucson (UA). In the role of the Steven M. Gootter Endowed Chair for the Prevention of Sudden Cardiac Death, Tardiff planned on establishing a clinic to focus on hypertrophic cardiomyopathy patients. She also launched several initiatives in the department of medicine including grant review and incentive programs for junior faculty members and developing the first CDA Research Symposium. In recognition of her efforts, she received a 2017 Faculty Mentoring Award along with Jarrod M. Mosier and C. Kent Kwoh. Tardiff was named to the scientific advisory board of the Marfan Foundation.
