= Sam Switzer =

American physician and medical researcher

Sam Switzer (born 1931, died June 4, 1967, in the Bronx, N.Y.) was an American physician and medical researcher.

== Education ==
Switzer graduated magna cum laude in 1952 from the City College of New York, where he won the Pell Medal as the top student in his class. He went to medical school at the New York University School of Medicine and graduated in 1956.

== Career ==
Switzer did a medical residency at the Bronx Municipal Hospital Center, and in 1958 was appointed as a senior surgeon at the United States Public Health Service and Atomic Bomb Casualty Commission in Hiroshima, where he did population research on urinary tract infections, hypertension, and ischemic heart disease.

In 1960 he returned to the U.S., where he became an assistant professor at the Albert Einstein College of Medicine and an assistant attending physician at the adjacent Bronx Municipal Hospital Center, turning the focus of his research to lipid metabolism and mechanisms of liver disease.

He was also appointed as a career investigator at the New York City Health Research Council.

== Publications ==
- Switzer, Sam (July 1, 1959). The clean-voided urine culture in surveying populations for urinary tract infection (Report) (in English and Japanese). Hiroshima, Japan: Atomic Bomb Casualty Commission. pp. 1–12. OCLC 1019997563.
- Switzer, Sam (November 12, 1963). ABCC-JNIH Adult Health Study Hiroshima, 1958 to 1959. Hypertension and ischemic heart disease (Report) (in English and Japanese). Hiroshima, Japan: Atomic Bomb Casualty Commission. pp. 1–28.
- Switzer, Sam (April 1960). "The clean-voided urine culture in surveying populations for urinary tract infection". Journal of Laboratory and Clinical Medicine. 55: 557–563. PMID 13836147.
- Switzer, Sam (January 5, 1961). "Bacteriuria in a Healthy Population and Its Relation to Hypertension and Pyelonephritis". The New England Journal of Medicine. 264 (1): 7–10. doi:10.1056/NEJM196101052640102. PMID 13774323.
- Switzer, Sam (September 1963). "Hypertension and Ischemic Heart Disease in Hiroshima, Japan". Circulation. 28 (3): 368–380. doi:10.1161/01.cir.28.3.368. PMID 14059457.
- Eder, H.A.; Roheim, P.S.; Switzer, S. (1964). "An Apoprotein of the Lipoproteins". Transactions of the Association of American Physicians. 77: 259–269. PMID 14275426.
- Roheim, P.S.; Switzer, S.; Girard, A.; Eder, H.A. (August 16, 1965). "The mechanism of inhibition of lipoprotein synthesis by orotic acid". Biochemical and Biophysical Research Communications. 20 (4): 416–421. Bibcode:1965BBRC...20..416R. doi:10.1016/0006-291X(65)90593-0. PMID 5861521.
- Switzer, Sam; Eder, Howard A. (October 1965). "Transport of lysolecithin by albumin in human and rat plasma". Journal of Lipid Research. 6 (4): 506–511. doi:10.1016/S0022-2275(20)39614-0. PMID 5865378.
- Roheim, P.S.; Switzer, S.; Girard, A.; Eder, H.A. (January 1966). "Alterations of lipoprotein metabolism in orotic acid-induced fatty liver". American Journal of Pharmacy and the Sciences Supporting Public Health. 15 (1, Pt 1): 21–26. PMID 5931986.
- Switzer, Sam (November 1967). "Plasma Lipoproteins in Liver Disease: I. Immunologically Distinct Low-Density Lipoproteins in Patients with Biliary Obstruction" (PDF). Journal of Clinical Investigation. 46 (11): 1855–1866. doi:10.1172/JCI105676. PMC 292936. PMID 4168732.
- Switzer, S. (November 1967). "Plasma lipoproteins in the differential diagnosis of liver disease". Gastroenterology. 53 (5). Williams & Wilkins: 790–793. doi:10.1016/S0016-5085(19)34164-2. PMID 6061365.

== Death ==
Along with his 7-year-old daughter Mallory, Switzer died following injuries sustained in an automobile crash on a rainy night. He was survived by his wife Phyllis and his son Brian, who were both seriously injured in the accident.
