= Liise-anne Pirofski =

American immunologist

- Born: Geneva, Switzerland
- Education: University of California, Berkeley (BA); Albert Einstein College of Medicine (MD)
- Known for: Infectious diseases
- Scientific career
- Workplaces: Albert Einstein College of Medicine

Liise-anne Pirofski is a Professor of Medicine, Microbiology and Immunology at Albert Einstein College of Medicine and Montefiore Medical Center. She is a Member of the Association of American Physicians, and a Fellow of the American Association for the Advancement of Science, American Academy of Microbiology, American College of Physicians and the Infectious Diseases Society of America.

== Early life and education ==
Pirofski grew up in Northern California, close to U.S. Route 101. When she was a child she wanted to become an announcer for the San Francisco Giants. At the age of sixteen she attended University of California, Berkeley. She studied history of art and psychology. She was particularly fascinated by the different representations of the Dance of Death, an artistic genre that visualises the personification of death from all walks of life. This made Pirofski interested in the impact of disease on society. During the end of her college degree she decided to pursue a career in medicine. She received her Doctorate of Medicine (MD) at the Albert Einstein College of Medicine in 1982 and trained in internal medicine at Bellevue Hospital. At the time the HIV/AIDS epidemic was unfolding in the United States and many patients Pirofski and her colleagues at Bellevue cared for were suffering and dying from the disease. Her experience caring for patients with HIV/AIDS, a new disease at that time, led her to pursue a career path as a physician-scientist specializing in infectious diseases. Her clinical experiences led her to see the need for more science to understand why even when powerful and antibiotics were available, like for the pneumococcus or cryptococcus, they could not prevent the recurrence of pneumococcal or mortality from cryptococcal disease Her experiences during her medical training inspired Pirofski to train as a scientist focused on understanding how vaccines work and immunotherapy. She trained in the laboratory of Matthew Scharff, working on the structure and function of antibodies to encapsulated pathogens. She joined the faculty at the Albert Einstein College of Medicine in 1988.

== Research and career ==
Pirofski is interested in innate and vaccine-induced immunity to encapsulated microbes. She studies the immune response to the mycosis Cryptococcosis and the bacterium Streptococcus pneumoniae. She has explored antibody-based therapies for the treatment of infectious diseases. In the early 2000s, in collaboration with Arturo Casadevall, Pirofski developed the ‘Damage-Response Framework’ of microbial pathogenesis; which is a theory focused on the outcome of host-microbe interaction that considers the role of both hosts and pathogens in the outcome of infectious diseases and microbial pathogenesis. Pirofski was appointed chief of the division of infectious diseases at Albert Einstein College of Medicine and Montefiore Medical Center in 2006.

During the COVID-19 pandemic Pirofski looked to deploy convalescent plasma, a therapy with a century long history of use in epidemics, as a treatment for COVID-19. She, along with colleagues in New York City and Connecticut, is leading a clinical trial of convalescent plasma, a form of antibody-based therapy for the disease. The treatment involves the administration of convalescent plasma, the liquid portion of blood containing antibodies to SARS-CoV-2, which is obtained from people who have recently recovered from COVID-19. This type of treatment is being studied for its efficacy in patients who are exposed to SARS-CoV-2, as well as those suffering from COVID-19. Convalescent plasma therapy is a form of passive immunization that provides patients with antibodies to fight the disease. In the absence of a vaccine, passive immunization is a powerful way to provide antibodies and boost the immune system of people with SARS-CoV-2 and may remain particularly important for immunocompromised people who may not be able to mount a strong vaccine response. The treatment was approved by the Food and Drug Administration on March 24, 2020. and as of July 2020 numerous randomized controlled clinical trials of its efficacy in hospitalized patients and outpatients are ongoing. Pirofski has found the way in which recovered patients came forth to donate their plasma to treat others heartwarming and a celebration of their spirit and courage in wanting to help others and contribute to the advancement of evidence based science.

Pirofski has been chief of the Division of Infectious Diseases and the Jacques and Selma Mitrani Chair in Biomedical Research at Albert Einstein College of Medicine and Montefiore Medical Center since 2006. In an article describing her career as a physician scientist, she wrote “The greatest treasure my career has brought is the opportunity to support and encourage others in their effort to make inroads in the fields of infectious diseases, immunity, and microbial pathogenesis. Although my own accomplishments and the advances to which I have contributed are very satisfying, what makes my days worthwhile is the thought that my support and encouragement might help others make discoveries that may alleviate suffering and improve human health.”

== Awards and honours ==
- 2004 Harry Eagle Award for Outstanding Pre-Clerkship Teaching
- 2006 Elected to the American Academy of Microbiology
- 2013 Elected to the American Association of Physicians
- 2013 Pirofski Wins Einstein Faculty Mentoring Award
- 2014 Maxwell Finland Award Lecturer
- 2015 American Society for Microbiology William A. Hinton Research Training Award
- 2016 Elected Fellow of the American Association for the Advancement of Science
- 2017 Albert Einstein College of Medicine Lifetime Achievement Award

Dr. Pirofski is a Fellow of the Infectious Diseases Society of America and the American College of Physicians.

== Selected publications ==
- Casadevall, A; Pirofski, LA (1 April 2020). "The convalescent sera option for containing COVID-19". The Journal of Clinical Investigation. 130 (4): 1545–1548. doi:10.1172/JCI138003. PMC 7108922. PMID 32167489.
- Yoon, HA; Nakouzi, A; Chang, CC; Kuniholm, MH; Carreño, LJ; Wang, T; Ndung'u, T; Lewin, SR; French, MA; Pirofski, LA (9 January 2019). "Association Between Plasma Antibody Responses and Risk for Cryptococcus-Associated Immune Reconstitution Inflammatory Syndrome". The Journal of Infectious Diseases. 219 (3): 420–428. doi:10.1093/infdis/jiy447. PMC 6325352. PMID 30010905.
- Doyle, CR; Moon, JY; Daily, JP; Wang, T; Pirofski, LA (July 2018). "A Capsular Polysaccharide-Specific Antibody Alters Streptococcus pneumoniae Gene Expression during Nasopharyngeal Colonization of Mice". Infection and Immunity. 86 (7). doi:10.1128/IAI.00300-18. PMC 6013671. PMID 29735523.
- Casadevall, Arturo; Pirofski, Liise-anne (October 2003). "The damage-response framework of microbial pathogenesis". Nature Reviews Microbiology. 1 (1): 17–24. doi:10.1038/nrmicro732. ISSN 1740-1534. PMC 7097162. PMID 15040176.
