= Sten H. Vermund =

Sten H. Vermund is the Anna M.R. Lauder Professor of Public Health, and former Dean (2017-2022) of the Yale School of Public Health, and also serves as a Professor in Pediatrics at the Yale School of Medicine. He is a pediatrician and infectious disease epidemiologist focused on diseases of low and middle-income countries.

== Education and early career ==
Vermund, whose parents were immigrants from Norway, was born in Minnesota, and grew up in Wisconsin and California. He has a B.A. from Stanford University in Human Biology (1974, with Distinction) an M.D. from the Albert Einstein College of Medicine, an M.Sc. from the London School of Hygiene and Tropical Medicine in Community Health in Developing Countries (1981, awarded the Lalcaca Medal) and a Ph.D. from Columbia University in Epidemiology (1990; 2014 recipient of the Allan Rosenfield Alumni Award for Excellence in Public Health, Mailman School of Public Health).n

His work with Einstein/Montefiore/NCI/CDC colleagues on HIV-HPV interactions among women in Bronx methadone programs motivated a change in the 1993 CDC AIDS case surveillance definition and inspired cervical cancer screening programs launched within HIV/AIDS programs around the world. He has contributed to key issues in parasitic disease epidemiology, sexually transmitted infections, child health in low income countries, HIV epidemiology, and strategies for HIV care and prevention in Africa, Asia, and resource-limited settings in the U.S., particularly in the southeast. His work as of 2022 includes COVID-19 risk reduction in schools and arts organizations, capacity building for the Institut National de Santé Publique in Chad funded by USAID, HIV research networks (HIV Prevention Trials Network and Implementation Science Coordination Initiative), social entrepreneurship in public health in India and the U.S., and NIH-funded research. 16
