= Noah McKay =

American physician

- Born: Nasser Talebzadeh Ordoubadi ناصر طالب‌زاده اردوبادی; 1956; Tehran, Iran
- Died: February 13, 2009 (aged 52–53)
- Education: Albert Einstein College of Medicine
- Occupation: Physician
- Known for: The book: Wellness at Warp Speed
- Relatives: Nader Talebzadeh (brother)

Noah McKay also known as Nasser Ordoubadi (born Nasser Talebzadeh Ordoubadi Persian: ناصر طالب‌زاده اردوبادی; 1956 – February 13, 2009) was an Iranian-American physician.

== Life and education ==
McKay was born Nasser Ordoubadi in 1956 in Tehran, the capital of Iran. His father Mansour Talebzadeh Ordoubadi was a high-ranking military officer in the Pahlavi era. After immigrating to the United States in 1974, he started his higher education at Tufts University in Massachusetts, he studied medicine and in 1983 received his M.D. from the Albert Einstein College of Medicine in New York.

== Life's Work ==
McKay practiced medicine as a general practitioner in the Seattle area from 1985 to 2000. He was both an owner and physician at the General Medical Clinics. He used the recovery of his own serious myocarditis in 1989 as an example for practicing whole body wellness with his patients. The medical clinics were established at six locations.

In 1999, after four years of litigation with an insurance company, federal charges were filed against McKay and three clinic managers at GMC and WellNet LLC. By the end of 2000 all six clinics were shut down and he had filed for corporate and personal bankruptcy. McKay agreed to the government's plea bargain agreement and served 13 months at the Sheridan Federal Prison Camp in Sheridan, Oregon. He began his sentence on Feb. 1, 2001.

McKay is best known for his work as a public speaker and his book Wellness at Warp Speed that was written about his own personal health episodes and challenges with his heart, and his experience of going to prison.

== Health issues and death ==
McKay experienced a myocarditis in 1989, and had valve replacement surgery in 2003. He suffered an aortic dissection in late 2008 and after surviving the initial surgery, succumbed to complications in early 2009.
