= Ronald DePinho =

American physician and research scientist

Ronald A. DePinho
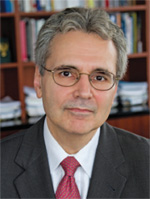
- Born: 1955 (age 70–71)
- Citizenship: U.S
- Education: Fordham University; Albert Einstein College of Medicine
- Known for: Genetic and biological mechanisms governing the development of cancer and driving the aging process and age-associated degenerative diseases.
- Spouse: Lynda Chin
- Children: 3
- Scientific career
- Workplaces: MD Anderson Cancer Center; Dana–Farber Cancer Institute; Harvard Medical School; Albert Einstein College of Medicine

Ronald A. DePinho (born 1955) is an American physician and research scientist. He served as president of MD Anderson Cancer Center from 2011 to 2017. DePinho states that his concern for reducing the burden of cancer suffering became his life goal in 1998, when his father died of colon cancer.

== Early life and education ==
DePinho was born in the Bronx, New York City in 1955 to Celeste and Alvaro DePinho. He is the third of five children. He earned a bachelor's degree in biological sciences in 1977 from Fordham University. He received his medical degree with distinction in microbiology and immunology in 1981 from Albert Einstein College of Medicine.

He completed an internship and residency in internal medicine at Columbia-Presbyterian Medical Center, followed by postdoctoral fellowships in the Department of Cell Biology at Albert Einstein College of Medicine and in the Department of Biochemistry and Biophysics at Columbia-Presbyterian Medical Center.

== Career ==
DePinho spent 14 years at Dana–Farber Cancer Institute. He served as founding director of the Belfer Institute for Applied Cancer Science and was an American Cancer Society Research Professor in the Department of Medicine (Genetics) at Harvard Medical School. Previously, he held several faculty positions during 10 years at Albert Einstein College of Medicine in New York, where he was the Betty and Sheldon Feinberg Senior Scholar in Cancer Research.

DePinho is Professor and former president in the Department of Cancer Biology at The University of Texas MD Anderson Cancer Center in Houston, Texas, and holds the Harry Graves Burkhart III Distinguished University Chair in Cancer Biology. He assumed the presidency at MD Anderson on September 1, 2011. There, he founded the Institute for Applied Cancer Science to accelerate development of next-generation targeted immune- and cell-based cancer therapies. He launched MD Anderson's Cancer Moon Shots Program, which became a model for the White House Cancer Moonshot funded by President Barack Obama under the leadership of then-Vice President Joe Biden and administered by National Cancer Institute.

DePinho publicly announced his resignation as MD Anderson president on March 8, 2017, after scrutiny over the administration of the organization had put him in the spotlight. "DePinho's five-and-a-half years at the helm of the world's largest cancer center were marked by unprecedented turbulence, questions of conflicts of interest, and unhappiness on the part of the faculty."

== Research ==
DePinho is best known for his work on telomerase and telomere dysfunction as it relates to cancer and aging. Specifically, in collaboration with Carol Greider, he generated the first telomerase knockout mouse. This work led to a deeper understanding of telomerase and telomere dysfunction in cancer, aging and a range of degenerative diseases, including fibrosis.

DePinho's scientific program has made basic discoveries underlying cancer in the aged and factors governing acquired and inherited degenerative disorders. His laboratory established the concept of tumor maintenance, discovered a core pathway of aging and demonstrated that aging is a reversible process. He has constructed and used refined mouse models of cancer to identify many new cancer targets and diagnostics.

He has published over 400 peer-reviewed research articles, review articles and book chapters (h-index 171). He was inducted into the National Academy of Medicine in 2008, the American Academy of Arts and Sciences in 2010, the National Academy of Sciences in 2012, and named an American Association for Cancer Research fellow in 2015.

== Honors ==
- Commander of the Order of Saint James of the Sword, Portugal (9 June 2015)
- Ellis Island Medal of Honor, National Ethnic Coalition of Organizations (2017)
- Honorary PhD Degree, Hofstra University (2017)

== Selected publications ==
- Hu, Baoli; Wang, Qianghu; et al. (November 2016). "Epigenetic Activation of WNT5A Drives Glioblastoma Stem Cell Differentiation and Invasive Growth". Cell. 167 (5): 1281–1295.e18. doi:10.1016/j.cell.2016.10.039. PMC 5320931. PMID 27863244.
- Viale, Andrea; Pettazzoni, Piergiorgio; Lyssiotis, Costas A.; Ying, Haoqiang; Sánchez, Nora; Marchesini, Matteo; Carugo, Alessandro; Green, Tessa; Seth, Sahil; Giuliani, Virginia; Kost-Alimova, Maria; Muller, Florian; Colla, Simona; Nezi, Luigi; Genovese, Giannicola; Deem, Angela K.; Kapoor, Avnish; Yao, Wantong; Brunetto, Emanuela; Kang, Ya'an; Yuan, Min; Asara, John M.; Wang, Y. Alan; Heffernan, Timothy P.; Kimmelman, Alec C.; Wang, Huamin; Fleming, Jason B.; Cantley, Lewis C.; DePinho, Ronald A.; Draetta, Giulio F. (30 October 2014). "Oncogene ablation-resistant pancreatic cancer cells depend on mitochondrial function". Nature. 514 (7524): 628–632. Bibcode:2014Natur.514..628V. doi:10.1038/nature13611. PMC 4376130. PMID 25119024.
- Son, Jaekyoung; Lyssiotis, Costas A.; Ying, Haoqiang; Wang, Xiaoxu; Hua, Sujun; Ligorio, Matteo; Perera, Rushika M.; Ferrone, Cristina R.; Mullarky, Edouard; Shyh-Chang, Ng; Kang, Ya'an; Fleming, Jason B.; Bardeesy, Nabeel; Asara, John M.; Haigis, Marcia C.; DePinho, Ronald A.; Cantley, Lewis C.; Kimmelman, Alec C. (4 April 2013). "Glutamine supports pancreatic cancer growth through a KRAS-regulated metabolic pathway". Nature. 496 (7443): 101–105. Bibcode:2013Natur.496..101S. doi:10.1038/nature12040. PMC 3656466. PMID 23535601.
- Ying, Haoqiang; Kimmelman, Alec C.; et al. (April 2012). "Oncogenic Kras Maintains Pancreatic Tumors through Regulation of Anabolic Glucose Metabolism". Cell. 149 (3): 656–670. doi:10.1016/j.cell.2012.01.058. PMC 3472002. PMID 22541435.
- Paik, Ji-hye; Ding, Zhihu; et al. (November 2009). "FoxOs Cooperatively Regulate Diverse Pathways Governing Neural Stem Cell Homeostasis". Cell Stem Cell. 5 (5): 540–553. doi:10.1016/j.stem.2009.09.013. PMC 3285492. PMID 19896444.
- Zheng, Hongwu; Ying, Haoqiang; et al. (October 2008). "p53 and Pten control neural and glioma stem/progenitor cell renewal and differentiation". Nature. 455 (7216): 1129–1133. Bibcode:2008Natur.455.1129Z. doi:10.1038/nature07443. PMC 4051433. PMID 18948956.
- Paik, Ji-Hye; Kollipara, Ramya; et al. (January 2007). "FoxOs Are Lineage-Restricted Redundant Tumor Suppressors and Regulate Endothelial Cell Homeostasis". Cell. 128 (2): 309–323. doi:10.1016/j.cell.2006.12.029. PMC 1855089. PMID 17254969.
- Maser, Richard S.; Choudhury, Bhudipa; et al. (June 2007). "Chromosomally unstable mouse tumours have genomic alterations similar to diverse human cancers". Nature. 447 (7147): 966–971. Bibcode:2007Natur.447..966M. doi:10.1038/nature05886. PMC 2714968. PMID 17515920.
