= Jordan Smoller =

American psychiatric geneticist

- Born: Jordan Wassertheil Smoller; October 13, 1961 (age 65)
- Education: Harvard University; Harvard Medical School; Harvard School of Public Health
- Scientific career
- Fields: Psychiatric genetics
- Workplaces: Harvard Medical School; Harvard School of Public Health; Massachusetts General Hospital
- Thesis: Genetic determinants of panic and phobic anxiety disorders (2001)

Jordan Wassertheil Smoller (born October 13, 1961) is an American psychiatrist, epidemiologist and geneticist whose research focus has been understanding the genetic and environmental determinants of psychiatric disorders across the lifespan and using big data to advance precision mental health including improved methods to reduce risk and enhance resilience.

Dr. Smoller earned his undergraduate degree summa cum laude at Harvard University and his medical degree at Harvard Medical School. After completing residency training in Psychiatry at McLean Hospital, he received master's and doctoral degrees in epidemiology at the Harvard School of Public Health.

Dr. Smoller is the Massachusetts General Hospital Jerrold F. Rosenbaum Endowed Chair in Psychiatry, Professor of Psychiatry at Harvard Medical School and a Professor in the Department of Epidemiology at the Harvard School of Public Health. He serves as Director of the Psychiatric and Neurodevelopmental Genetics Unit at Massachusetts General Hospital Center for Genomic Medicine, and Director of the Center for Precision Psychiatry at Mass General Brigham Department of Psychiatry. His other positions include being Co-Director for Mass General Brigham Training Program in Precision and Genomic Medicine, and Co-Director for Center for Suicide Research and Prevention at Mass General Brigham and Harvard University. He also serves as Director of the Omics Unit of the Mass General Division of Clinical Research and Co-Director of the Mass General Brigham Biobank.

Dr. Smoller has played a leading role in national and international efforts to advance precision medicine. He is a Principal Investigator (PI) in the eMERGE (Electronic Medical Records and Genomics) network, founding PI of the PsycheMERGE Consortium and lead PI of the New England Precision Medicine Consortium as part of the NIH All of Us Research Program and Co-Chair of the All of Us Science Committee. Dr. Smoller is an author of more than 700 scientific publications and is also the author of The Other Side of Normal (HarperCollins/William Morrow, 2012).

Dr. Smoller is the son of Sylvia Wassertheil-Smoller.

In 2026, Dr. Jordan Smoller was elected to the National Academy of Medicine (NAM).
