= Neal Flomenbaum =

American physician

Neal Flomenbaum is an emergency physician, author, editor, and an expert in emergency medicine and clinical toxicology. He is emergency physician-in-chief at NewYork-Presbyterian Hospital/Weill Cornell Medical Center; medical director of the NewYork-Presbyterian Emergency Medical Service; and professor of clinical medicine at Weill Cornell Medical College of Cornell University.

== Background and education ==
Flomenbaum earned his AB in English at Columbia College, Columbia University and is an AOA graduate of the Albert Einstein College of Medicine. He completed his internal medicine residency at the Albert Einstein-Bronx Municipal (Jacobi) Hospital Center and served as associate director of emergency services there from 1977 to 1979. From 1979 to 1987, Flomenbaum was associate director of emergency services at Bellevue and NYU Hospital Centers and from 1987 to 1996, he was chairman of emergency medicine at the Long Island College Hospital.

Flomenbaum has held academic appointments as assistant professor of medicine at Albert Einstein College of Medicine and New York University (NYU) School of Medicine. From 1985 to 1988 he was a tenured associate professor of clinical medicine at NYU, and served as director or co-director for two dozen post-graduate medical courses in emergency medicine and clinical toxicology. Between 1988 and 1996 he was an associate professor of clinical medicine at State University of New York, Brooklyn - Downstate Medical Center. In 1996, Flomenbaum became a professor of clinical medicine at Weill Cornell Medical College of Cornell University and the first emergency physician-in-chief at the New York Hospital. He was also named medical director of NewYork-Presbyterian's Emergency Medical Services (EMS) system.

== Publications ==
Flomenbaum is a senior editor and author of Goldfrank's Toxicologic Emergencies (editions 2-9), Emergency Diagnostic Testing (editions 1-2) and Emergency Reference Guide (editions 1-4). He has authored or co-authored many review articles and peer-reviewed clinical research papers. Flomenbaum is on the editorial boards of the American Journal of Emergency Medicine (AJEM), Poisindex, Emergindex and other medical publications. Since 2006, Flomenbaum has been the editor-in-chief of Emergency Medicine, for which he writes monthly editorials.

== Memberships ==
Flomenbaum is a senior examiner for the American Board of Emergency Medicine, and a consultant to the New York City Poison Control Center. He is a fellow of the American College of Physicians (FACP), the American College of Emergency Physicians (FACEP) and the New York Academy of Medicine, where he is the founding chairman of the Section on Emergency Medicine. Between 1983 and 1985, he was chairman of the Medical Advisory Committee for New York City's emergency medical service. A member of the Albert Einstein College of Medicine Alumni Association board of governors for many years, Flomenbaum served as its national president from 1997 to 1999.
