= Sylvia Wassertheil-Smoller =

American epidemiologist (born 1932)

- Born: Sylvia Maria Wassertheil; 1932 (age 93–94)
- Education: Syracuse University; New York University
- Spouse: David Wassertheil (m. 1955; died 1968)
- Children: Jordan Smoller
- Scientific career
- Fields: Epidemiology
- Workplaces: Albert Einstein College of Medicine
- Thesis: Human Information Processing in Logical Problem Solving (1969)
- Doctoral advisor: Mark S. Mayzner

Sylvia Wassertheil-Smoller (born 1932) is an American epidemiologist and Distinguished University Professor Emerita in the Department of Epidemiology & Population Health at Albert Einstein College of Medicine, where she first joined the faculty in 1969. She also serves as Dorothy and William Manealoff Foundation and Molly Rosen Chair in Social Medicine Emerita at the Albert Einstein College of Medicine, as a principal investigator of their Women's Health Initiative, and as co-principal investigator for their site in the Hispanic Community Health Study. She is a fellow of the American College of Epidemiology, the New York Academy of Sciences, and the American Heart Association.
