= K. Anders Ericsson =

Swedish psychologist (1947–2020)

- Born: Karl Anders Ericsson; 23 October 1947; Stockholm, Sweden
- Died: 17 June 2020 (aged 72); Tallahassee, Florida, United States
- Education: University of Stockholm
- Scientific career
- Fields: Psychology, Expertise
- Workplaces: Florida State University
- Thesis: Approaches to descriptions and analyses of problem-solving processes: The 8-puzzle (1976)

K. Anders Ericsson (23 October 1947 – 17 June 2020) was a Swedish psychologist and Conradi Eminent Scholar and Professor of Psychology at Florida State University who was internationally recognized as a researcher in the psychological nature of expertise and human performance.

Ericsson studied expert performance in domains such as medicine, music, chess, and sports, focusing exclusively on extended deliberate practice (e.g., high concentration practice beyond one's comfort zone) as a means of how expert performers acquire their superior performance. Critically, Ericsson's program of research served as a direct complement to other research that addresses cognitive ability, personality, interests, and other factors that help researchers understand and predict deliberate practice and expert performance.

In a highly cited 1993 paper, Ericsson and colleagues conducted studies in which they concluded that expert violinists derived their talent not from innate abilities but rather from large amounts of deliberate practice over a period of 10 years or more. Canadian journalist Malcolm Gladwell drew upon Ericsson's research to establish his so-called 10,000 hour rule in the book Outliers. Ericsson later wrote that 'this rule...is wrong in several ways'. 10,000 was the average number of deliberate practice hours that the violinists had achieved by age 20, at which point the violinists 'were nowhere near masters'. Furthermore, the number of hours required to become an expert has been demonstrated to vary depending on field. In addition, Gladwell did not differentiate between deliberate practice and other forms of practice.

== Career ==
Ericsson received a PhD in 1976 from Stockholm University.

With Bill Chase, he developed the Theory of Skilled Memory based on detailed analyses of acquired exceptional memory performance (Chase, W. G., & Ericsson, K. A. (1982). Ericsson's research with Herbert A. Simon on verbal reports of thinking is summarized in a book Protocol Analysis: Verbal Reports as Data, which was revised in 1993. In G. H. Bower (Ed.), The psychology of learning and motivation, (Vol. 16). New York: Academic Press). One of his most striking experimental results was training a student to have a digit span of more than 100 digits. With Walter Kintsch, he extended this theory into long-term memory to account for the superior working memory of expert performers and memory experts. (Ericsson & Kintsch 1995)

In the domain of deliberate practice, Ericsson published an edited book with Jacqui Smith Toward a General Theory of Expertise in 1991 and edited a book The Road to Excellence: The Acquisition of Expert Performance in the Arts and Sciences, Sports and Games that appeared in 1996, as well as a collection edited with Janet Starkes Expert Performance in Sports: Recent Advances in Research on Sport Expertise in 2003. In 2016 he and Robert Pool published the book Peak: Secrets from the New Science of Expertise.

Ericsson was the co-editor of The Cambridge Handbook of Expertise and Expert Performance, a volume released in 2006. He was also Fellow of the American Psychological Association.

== Publications ==
- Anders Ericsson, K; Krampe, Ralf Th; Tesch-Romer, Clemens (1993). "The Role of Deliberate Practice in the Acquisition of Expert Performance" (PDF). Psychological Review. 100 (3): 363–406. doi:10.1037/0033-295x.100.3.363. Archived from the original (PDF) on 24 September 2026.
- Ericsson, Anders K.; Prietula, Michael J.; Cokely, Edward T. (2007). "The Making of an Expert". Harvard Business Review. 85 (July–August 2007): 114–21, 193. PMID 17642130.
- Ericsson, Anders K.; Roring, Roy W.; Nandagopal, Kiruthiga (2007). "Giftedness and evidence for reproducibly superior performance" (PDF). High Ability Studies. 18 (1): 3–56. doi:10.1080/13598130701350593. Archived from the original (PDF) on 10 February 2026.
- Ericsson, Anders K.; Kintsch, Walter (1995). "Long-term working memory". Psychological Review. 102 (2): 211–245. doi:10.1037/0033-295X.102.2.211. PMID 7740089. Archived from the original on 2 April 2025.
- Ericsson, K. Anders (2003). "The Search for General Abilities and Basic Capacities: Theoretical Implications from the Modifiability and Complexity of Mechanisms Mediating Expert Performance". In Sternberg, Robert J.; Grigorenko, Elena L. (eds.). The Psychology of Abilities, Competencies, and Expertise. Cambridge: Cambridge University Press. pp. 93–125. doi:10.1017/CBO9780511615801.006. ISBN 978-0-521-00776-4.
- Charness, Neil; Feltovich, Paul J.; Hoffman, Robert R.; Ericsson, K. Anders, eds. (2006). The Cambridge Handbook of Expertise and Expert Performance. Cambridge: Cambridge University Press. ISBN 9780521840972.
- Ericsson, Anders; Pool, Robert (2016). Peak: Secrets from the New Science of Expertise. Boston: Houghton Mifflin Harcourt. ISBN 978-0544456235.

== See also ==
Outliers: The Story of Success
