= David Epstein (journalist) =

American journalist (born 1980)

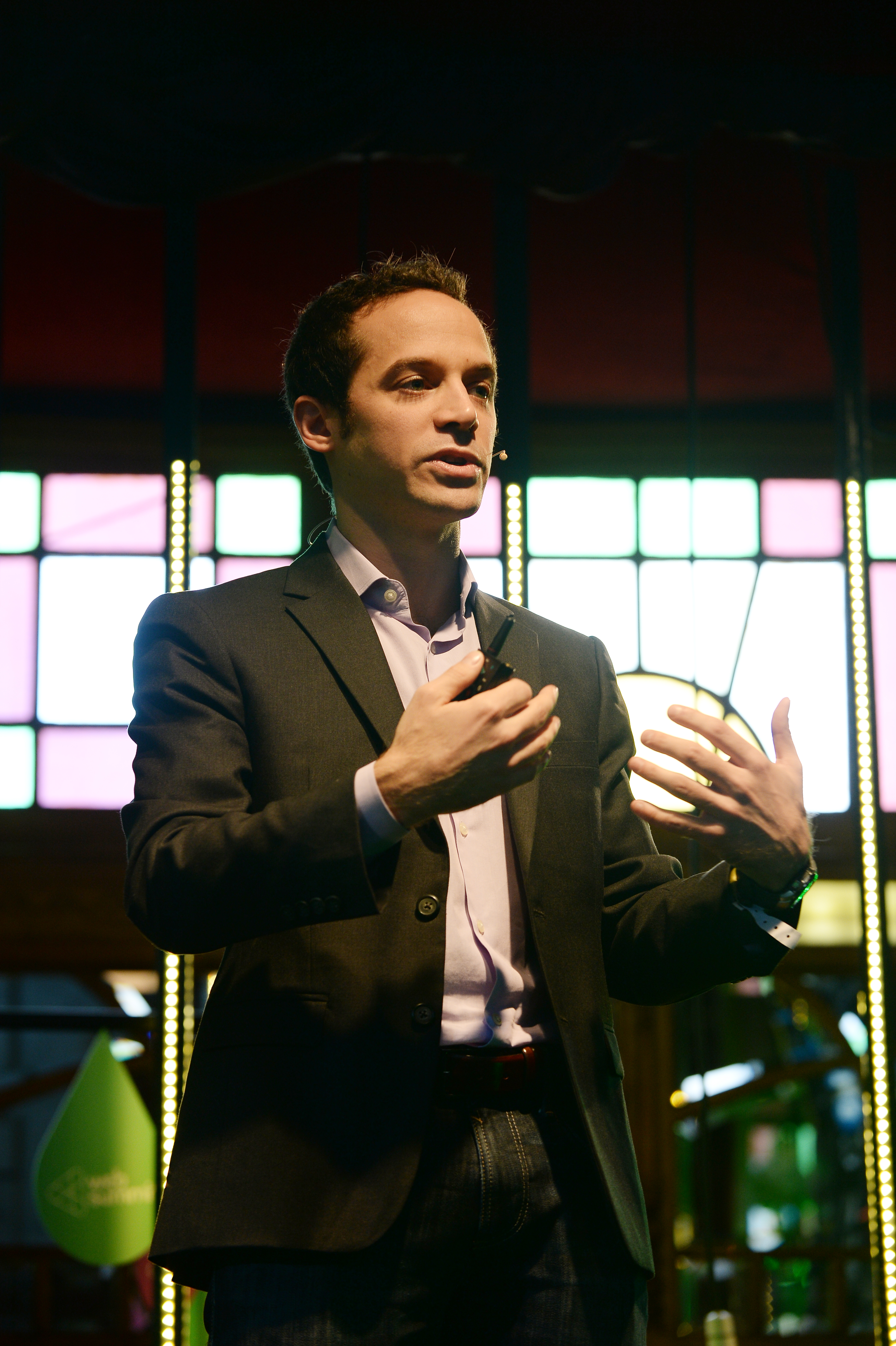
- Born: David Epstein; 1980 (age 45–46)
- Education: Columbia University
- Occupation: Journalist
- Writing career
- Genre: Non-fiction
- Notable works: The Sports Gene (2013); Range (2019); Inside the Box (2026)
- Website: www.davidepstein.com

David Epstein (born 1980) is an American journalist. He is the author of the #1 New York Times best seller Range: Why Generalists Triumph in a Specialized World (2019), The Sports Gene: Inside the Science of Extraordinary Athletic Performance (2013), and Inside the Box: How Constraints Make Us Better (2026), both also New York Times best sellers.

Epstein has given two TED talks related to his books, which have together been viewed more than 12 million times.

Epstein was previously an investigative reporter at ProPublica. Prior to ProPublica, Epstein was a senior writer at Sports Illustrated, where he specialized in science issues in sports and investigative reporting. With his colleague Selena Roberts, Epstein broke the story that the Yankees' Alex Rodriguez tested positive for steroids in 2003.

== Life ==
Epstein is a graduate of Columbia University, where he was on a 4 x 800 - meter relay team that set the school record, and was given an award for the varsity athlete who “achieved significant success in the face of unusual challenge and difficulty.” He earned a bachelor's degree in environmental science and astronomy (2002) and master's degrees in environmental science and journalism.

Epstein is married and has a son.

== Works ==
- The Sports Gene: Inside the Science of Extraordinary Athletic Performance. New York. 2013. ISBN 9781591845119. OCLC 836557840.
- Range: Why Generalists Triumph in a Specialized World. New York. 2019. ISBN 9780735214484. OCLC 1050962413.
- Inside the Box: How Constraints Make Us Better. New York. 2026. ISBN 9780593715710. OCLC 1534514795.
