= The Sports Gene =

Book by David Epstein

The Sports Gene: Inside the Science of Extraordinary Athletic Performance
- Author: David Epstein
- Language: English
- Genre: Sports
- Published: 2013 (Penguin Books)
- Publication place: United States
- Media type: Print (hardback)
- Pages: 353
- ISBN: 978-1617230127

The Sports Gene is a nonfiction book written by David Epstein, at the time a senior writer for Sports Illustrated, on the effects of genetics and sports training on human athleticism. Through investigative journalism, Epstein takes the reader through his experiences regarding what makes the difference between an amateur and a pro-athlete. The book was published in August 2013 by Penguin Books.

== Overview ==
This book explores the question of nature versus nurture as it pertains to training for athletes in sports using anecdotes which favor both sides of the argument. These anecdotes are combined with the results of statistical studies to give the reader an understanding of the magnitude that biology plays in athletics. Topics such as the effects of gender, race, genetics, culture, and physical environment are discussed as contributors to success in specific sports.

=== Race and sport ===
Epstein explores racial differences in sports performance and examines both nature and nurture arguments for why certain populations (such as Jamaicans and Kalenjin) are overrepresented among top performers in the 100 meters sprint and marathons respectively. Epstein examines the argument that Kalenjin tend to have a body type conducive to distance running in part due to Allen's Rule. He also explores the contribution of growing up and training at altitude, as well as the phenomenon of running to and from school. In the course of his research, Epstein followed geneticist Yannis Pitsiladis to Jamaica, where he explored folklore that Jamaican sprinters descend from a warrior class of maroons. Pitsiladis analyzes DNA in Jamaica, and finds no special signature that links maroons and sprinters, and concludes that the genetic evidence does not support the island folklore. Rather, both Epstein and Pitsiladis place considerable emphasis on the popularity of the national high school track and field championships as part of the Jamaican sprint dynasty. In chapter of the book, Epstein discusses problems with classifying athletes as simply "black", as he notes that there is more genetic diversity within Africa than in all of the rest of the world combined. He refers to work on global genetic diversity and migration from Yale's Kidd Lab to emphasize the point. He also notes that genetic diversity does not break down into discrete races in the way that people often assume.

== Reception ==
The book received positive reviews from The New York Times, Science, Nature, The Washington Post, and The Guardian.

== Deleted chapter ==
In August 2013, Epstein published a "deleted chapter" from the book on epigenetics.
