= Angela Duckworth =

American psychologist (born 1970)

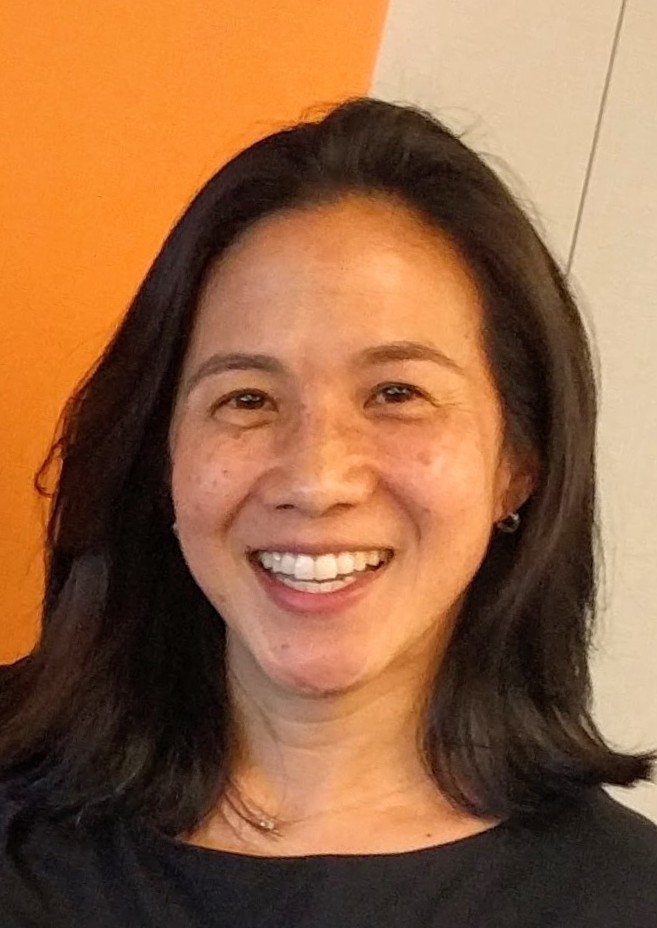
- Duckworth in 2017
- Born: Angela Susan Lee; 1970 (age 55–56); Philadelphia, Pennsylvania, U.S.
- Education: Harvard University (BA); University of Oxford (MSc); University of Pennsylvania (MA, PhD)
- Spouse: Jason Duckworth (m. 1998)
- Children: 2
- Awards: MacArthur Fellowship; Marshall Scholarship
- Scientific career
- Fields: Psychology
- Thesis: Intelligence is not enough: non-IQ predictors of achievement (2006)

Angela Lee Duckworth (born Angela Susan Lee; 1970) is an American academic, psychologist, and popular science author. She is the Rosa Lee and Egbert Chang Professor of Psychology at the University of Pennsylvania, where she studies grit and self-control. She is also the founder and former CEO of Character Lab, a not-for-profit whose mission is to advance the science and practice of character development.

== Life ==
Duckworth was born Angela Susan Lee in 1970 to Chinese immigrants. Her father Ying Kao Lee (1933–2020) was a chemist with DuPont and invented Lucite dispersion lacquer.

Duckworth grew up in Cherry Hill, New Jersey, and graduated from Cherry Hill High School East. She earned a B.A. in neurobiology at Harvard College in 1992. She graduated from the University of Oxford in 1996 with an M.Sc. in neuroscience on a Marshall Scholarship, and from the University of Pennsylvania in 2006 with a Ph.D. in psychology. She was awarded a MacArthur Fellowship in 2013.

After obtaining a master's degree, Duckworth was a management consultant at McKinsey & Company. She quit about a year later to become a math teacher at Lowell High School (San Francisco).

Duckworth's first book, Grit: The Power of Passion and Perseverance, was released in May 2016. It stayed on The New York Times bestseller list for 21 weeks. A review of the book in The New York Times called Duckworth "the psychologist who has made 'grit' the reigning buzzword in education-policy circles."

Duckworth was the co-host of the podcast No Stupid Questions on the Freakonomics Radio network for its 223-episode run from 2020 to 2024.

== Grit ==
Duckworth is best known for her research on grit, a strength she defines as passion and perseverance for long-term goals. She developed the Grit Scale, a measure of this construct.

Duckworth has found grit to be a common factor among the high-achievers she has studied. Her work suggests that grit is unrelated to IQ but closely related to conscientiousness. Grit has been studied across the lifespan, but Duckworth focuses primarily on how building grit can help adolescents. This falls under the umbrella of character education and the movement to expand school instruction beyond solely cognitive factors.

Since the introduction of the Every Student Succeeds Act (ESSA) in 2015, there has been a growing call for effective ways to measure character strengths. However, Duckworth herself has encouraged caution when applying and, especially, testing character in classrooms. One reason is that existing measures were designed for scientific purposes, and so as yet there are no reliable ways to measure grit in high-stakes situations, like college admissions or job applications.

Some claim that focusing on grit would lead to the neglect of other important factors, like the positive socio-economic prerequisites necessary to deploy it. Duckworth has acknowledged the importance of environmental factors, saying that it's not that one matters more than the other but rather that they both matter: "The question is not whether we should concern ourselves with grit or structural barriers to achievement. In the most profound sense, both are important, and more than that, they are intertwined."

Grit has had its share of critics. A 2017 meta-analysis found that "grit is only moderately correlated with performance and retention," and that it had not been adequately distinguished from several previously studied constructs, including conscientiousness, persistence, and industriousness. In a 2021 article, Duckworth acknowledged that she had misinterpreted the psychometric properties of her Grit Scale.

== Works ==
- Grit: the power of passion and perseverance (First ed.). New York: Scribner. 2016. ISBN 978-1-5011-1110-5.
- Situated: find the people and places that bring out your best (First ed.). New York: Scribner. 2026. ISBN 978-1-6680-0594-1. OCLC 1611897622.
