= Outliers (book) =

2008 book by Malcolm Gladwell

Outliers: The Story of Success
- Book cover
- Author: Malcolm Gladwell
- Audio read by: Malcolm Gladwell
- Cover artist: Allison J. Warner
- Language: English
- Subject: Psychology
- Genre: Non-fiction
- Publisher: Little, Brown and Company
- Publication date: November 18, 2008
- Publication place: United States
- Media type: Hardback; paperback; audiobook
- Pages: 304 (A5)
- ISBN: 978-0316017923
- Dewey Decimal: 302 22
- LC Class: BF637.S8 G533 2008

Outliers: The Story of Success is a non-fiction book written by Canadian writer Malcolm Gladwell and published by Little, Brown and Company on November 18, 2008. In Outliers, Gladwell examines the factors that contribute to high levels of success. To support his thesis, he examines why the majority of Canadian ice hockey players are born in the first few months of the calendar year, how Microsoft co-founder Bill Gates achieved his extreme wealth, how the Beatles became one of the most successful musical acts in human history, how two people with exceptional intelligence—Christopher Langan and J. Robert Oppenheimer—end up with such vastly different fortunes, how Joseph Flom built Skadden, Arps, Slate, Meagher & Flom into one of the most successful law firms in the world, and how cultural differences play a large part in perceived intelligence and rational decision-making.

Throughout the book, Gladwell repeatedly mentions the "10,000-Hour Rule", claiming that the key to achieving world-class expertise in any skill, is, to a large extent, a matter of practicing the correct way, for a total of around 10,000 hours, though the authors of the original study have disputed Gladwell's usage.

The book debuted at number one on the bestseller lists of The New York Times and The Globe and Mail, holding the position on the former for eleven consecutive weeks. Generally well received by critics, Outliers was considered more personal than Gladwell's other works, and some reviews commented on how much Outliers felt like an autobiography. Reviews praised the connection that Gladwell draws between his own background and the rest of the publication to conclude the book. Reviewers also appreciated the questions posed by Outliers, finding it important to determine how much individual potential is ignored by society. However, the lessons learned were considered anticlimactic and dispiriting. The writing style, though deemed easy to understand, was criticized for oversimplifying complex social phenomena.

== Background ==
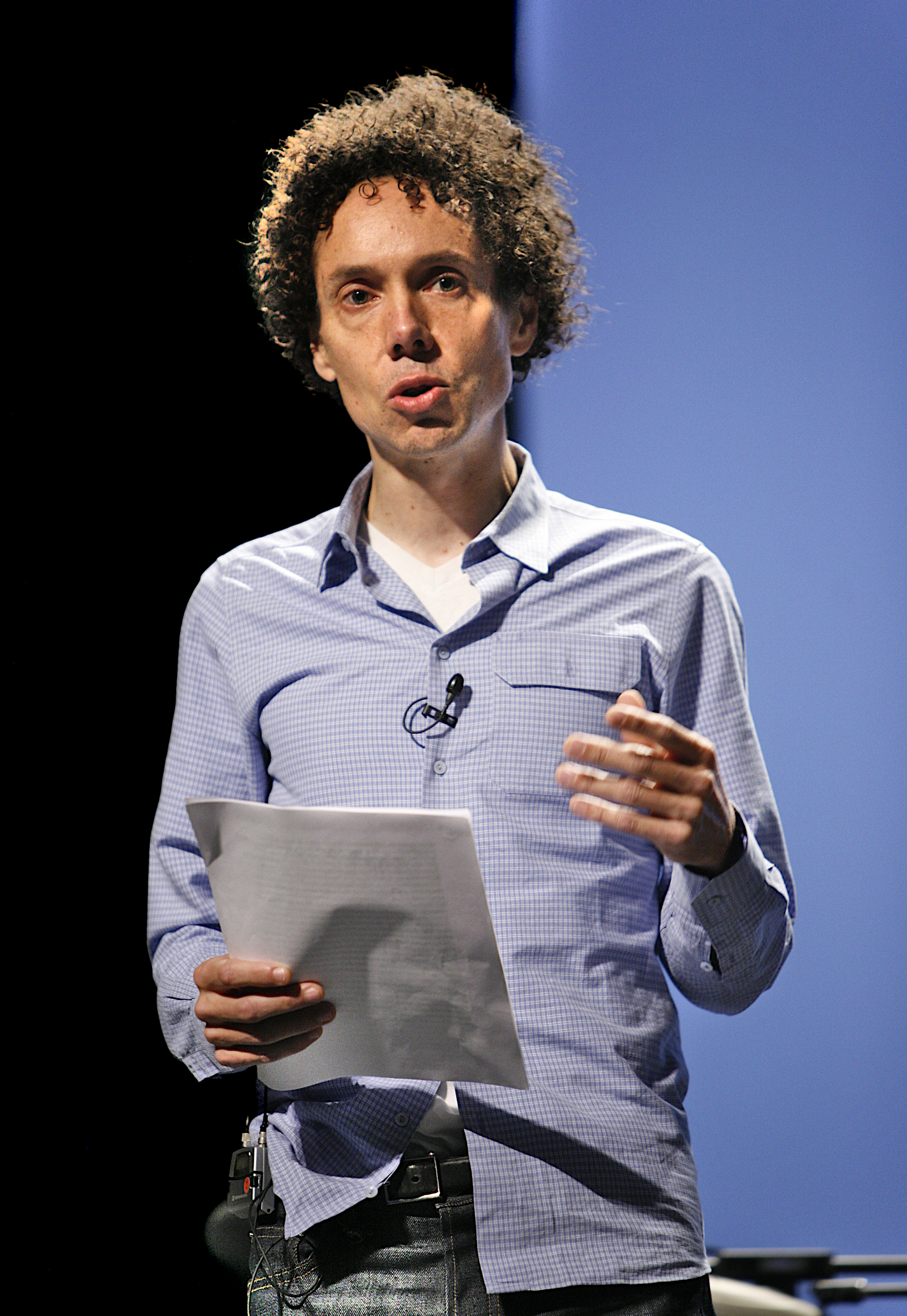
Outliers author Malcolm Gladwell

Gladwell was a journalist for The Washington Post before writing for The New Yorker. The subjects for his articles, usually non-fiction, range from "Dave Gaspayad's infomercial empire to computers that analyze pop songs". His familiarity with academic material has allowed him to write about "psychology experiments, sociological studies, law articles, statistical surveys of plane crashes and classical musicians and hockey players", which he converts into prose accessible to a general audience and which sometimes pass as memes into the popular imagination.

Before Outliers, Gladwell wrote two best-selling books: The Tipping Point (2000) and Blink (2005). Both books have been described as "pop economics". The Tipping Point focuses on how ideas and behaviors reach critical mass, such as how Hush Puppies rapidly grew popular in the 1990s. Blink explains "what happens during the first two seconds we encounter something, before we actually start to think". All Gladwell's books focus on singularities: singular events in The Tipping Point, singular moments in Blink, and singular people in Outliers. Gladwell was drawn to writing about singular things after he discovered that "they always made the best stories". Convinced that the most unusual stories had the best chance of reaching the front page of a newspaper, he was "quickly weaned off the notion that [he] should be interested in the mundane".

For Outliers, Gladwell spent time looking for research that made claims that were contrary to what he considered to be popularly held beliefs. In one of the book's chapters, in which Gladwell focuses on the American public school system, he used research conducted by university sociologist Karl Alexander that suggested that "the way in which education is discussed in the United States is backward". In another chapter, Gladwell cites pioneering research performed by Canadian psychologist Roger Barnsley when discussing how the birthdate of a young hockey player can determine their skill level in the future.

While writing the book, Gladwell noted that "the biggest misconception about success is that we do it solely on our smarts, ambition, hustle and hard work." In Outliers, he hopes to show that there are a lot more variables involved in an individual's success than society cares to admit, and he wants people to "move away from the notion that everything that happens to a person is up to that person". Gladwell noted that, although there was little that could be done with regard to a person's fate, society can still impact the "man"-affected part of an individual's success. When asked what message he wanted people to take away after reading Outliers, Gladwell responded, "What we do as a community, as a society, for each other, matters as much as what we do for ourselves. It sounds a little trite, but there's a powerful amount of truth in that, I think."

== Synopsis ==
In his introduction, Gladwell discusses the Roseto effect which enabled a small, close-knit town in Pennsylvania to have almost no history of heart disease, substance abuse, or societal ills, seemingly due to the supportive, comforting social environment of its Italian-descended population. The remainder of Outliers has two parts: "Part One: Opportunity" contains five chapters, and "Part Two: Legacy" has four. The book also contains an Introduction and Epilogue. Focusing on outliers, defined by Gladwell as people who do not fit into our normal understanding of achievement, Outliers deals with exceptional people, especially those who are smart, rich, and successful, and those who operate at the extreme outer edge of what is statistically plausible. The book offers examples that include the musical ensemble the Beatles, Microsoft's co-founder Bill Gates, and the theoretical physicist J. Robert Oppenheimer. In the introduction, Gladwell lays out the purpose of Outliers: "It's not enough to ask what successful people are like. [...] It is only by asking where they are from that we can unravel the logic behind who succeeds and who doesn't." Throughout the publication, he discusses how family, culture, and friendship each play a role in an individual's success, and he constantly asks whether successful people deserve the praise that we give them.

The book begins with the observation that a disproportionate number of elite Canadian hockey players are born in the earlier months of the calendar year. The reason behind this is that since youth hockey leagues determine eligibility by the calendar year, children born on January 1 play in the same league as those born on December 31 in the same year. Because children born earlier in the year are statistically larger and more physically mature than their younger competitors, and they are often identified as better athletes, this leads to extra coaching and a higher likelihood of being selected for elite hockey leagues. This phenomenon in which "the rich get richer and the poor get poorer" is dubbed "accumulative advantage" by Gladwell, while sociologist Robert K. Merton calls it "the Matthew Effect", named after a biblical verse in the Gospel of Matthew: "For unto everyone that hath shall be given, and he shall have abundance. But from him, that hath not shall be taken away even that which he hath." Outliers asserts that success depends on the idiosyncrasies of the selection process used to identify talent just as much as it does on the athletes' natural abilities.

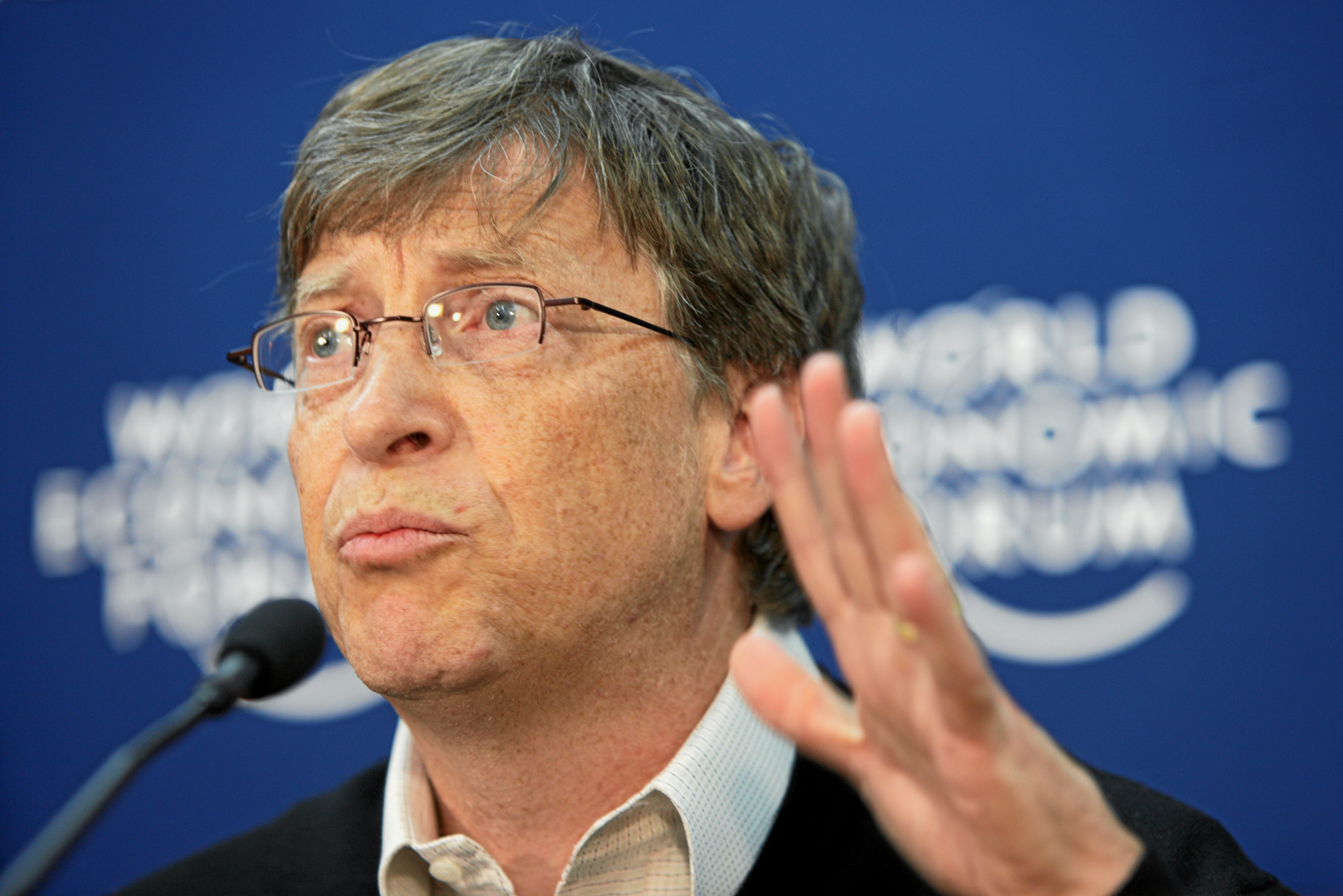
In Outliers, Malcolm Gladwell interviews Bill Gates and focuses on the opportunities given to him throughout his life that have led to his success.

A common theme that appears throughout Outliers is the "10,000-Hour Rule", based on a study by Anders Ericsson. Gladwell claims that greatness requires enormous time, using the source of the Beatles' musical talents and Gates' computer savvy as examples. The Beatles performed live in Hamburg, Germany over 1,200 times from 1960 to 1964, amassing more than 10,000 hours of playing time, therefore meeting the 10,000-Hour Rule. Gladwell asserts that all of the time the Beatles spent performing shaped their talent, and quotes a Beatles' biographer, Philip Norman, as claiming "So by the time they returned to England from Hamburg, Germany, 'they sounded like no one else. It was the making of them.'" Gates met the 10,000-Hour Rule when he gained access to a high school computer in 1968 at the age of 13, and spent 10,000 hours programming on it.

In Outliers, Gladwell interviews Gates, who says that unique access to a computer as early as 1968 when they were not commonplace helped him succeed. Without that access, Gladwell states that Gates would still be "a highly intelligent, driven, charming person and a successful professional", but that he might not be worth US$50 billion. Gladwell explains that reaching the 10,000-Hour Rule, which he considers the key to success in any field, is simply a matter of practicing a specific task that can be accomplished with 20 hours of work a week for 10 years. He also notes that he himself took exactly 10 years to meet the 10,000-Hour Rule, during his brief tenure at The American Spectator and his more recent job at The Washington Post.

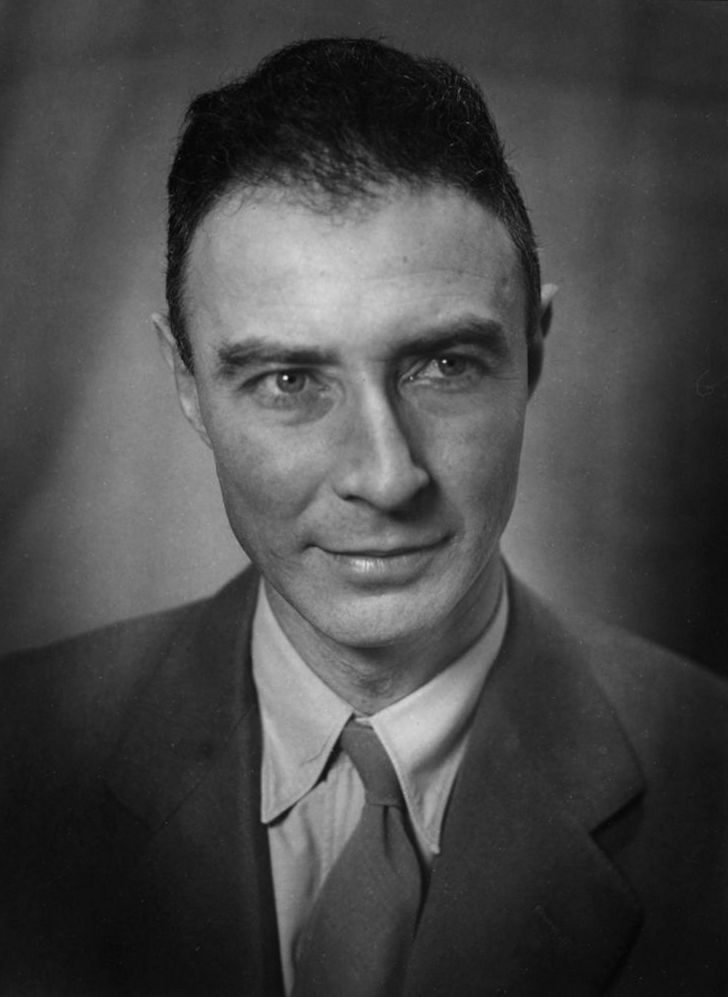
Gladwell argues that J. Robert Oppenheimer's affluent background helped give him the skills necessary to become successful.

Reemphasizing his theme, Gladwell continuously reminds the reader that genius is not the only or even the most important thing when determining a person's success. Using an anecdote to illustrate his claim, he discusses the story of Christopher Langan, a man who ended up owning a horse farm in rural Missouri despite having an IQ of 195 (Gladwell claims that Einstein's was 150). Gladwell points out that Langan has not reached a high level of success because of the destitute, dysfunctional environment in which he grew up. With no one in Langan's life and nothing in his background to help him take advantage of his exceptional gifts, he had to find success by himself. "No one—not rock stars, not professional athletes, not software billionaires, and not even geniuses—ever makes it alone", writes Gladwell.

Gladwell notes how many of the richest men in history were fortunate to come of age during decades of technological boom, or be born at times of low birth rates when universities and job opportunities were more open to applicants. Later, Gladwell compares Langan with Oppenheimer, the father of the atomic bomb. Noting that they typify innate natural abilities that should have helped them both succeed in life, Gladwell argues that Oppenheimer's upbringing made a pivotal difference in his life. Oppenheimer grew up in one of the wealthiest neighborhoods in Manhattan, was the son of a successful businessman and a painter, attended the Ethical Culture Fieldston School on Central Park West, and was afforded a childhood of concerted cultivation. Outliers argues that these opportunities gave Oppenheimer the chance to develop the practical intelligence necessary for success. Gladwell then provides an anecdote: When Oppenheimer was a student at the University of Cambridge he attempted to poison one of his tutors. He avoided punishment, and continued his studies by using the skills gained from his cultivated upbringing in his negotiation with the university's administrators, who had wanted to expel him.

In the next chapter, Gladwell explains the fact that Asians are good at mathematics by correlating it to rice agriculture, particularly the fact that rice cultivation requires more work ethic, discipline, and longer hours than Western wheat agriculture, and East Asian school systems have shorter summer recesses than Americans. The pattern of words for counting numbers is more logical in Asian languages than western languages.

Gladwell discusses how airline crashes can result from miscommunication between pilots and the control tower. The deferential culture of some ethnic groups can make those pilots reluctant to convey imminent danger to ground controllers. In chapter nine, Marita's Bargain, Gladwell advances the notion that the success of students of different cultures or different socio-economic backgrounds is in fact highly correlated to the time students spent in school or in educationally rich environments. He describes the Knowledge is Power Program (KIPP) which helps students from about 50 inner-city schools across the United States achieve much better results than other inner-city schools' students and explains that their success stems from the fact that they simply spent more hours at school during the school year and the summer. Gladwell also analyzes a five-year study done by Karl Alexander of Johns Hopkins University, demonstrating that summer holidays have a detrimental effect on students of disadvantaged backgrounds, who paradoxically progress more during the school year than students from the highest socioeconomic group. Gladwell discusses how Appalachian and Scottish culture both have a history of violent feuds. This is caused by the need for constant vigilance to guard livestock from rustlers – something not required of lowland farmers who grow mostly crops instead of livestock.

Before the book concludes, Gladwell writes about the unique roots of his Jamaican mother, Joyce, a descendant of African slaves. Joyce attended University College in London, where she met and fell in love with Graham Gladwell, a young mathematician. After moving together to Canada, Graham became a math professor and Joyce a writer and therapist. While Gladwell acknowledges his mother's ambition and intelligence, he also points out opportunities offered to his parents that helped them live a life better than those of other slave descendants in the West Indies. Gladwell also explains that, in the 18th century, a white plantation owner in Jamaica bought a female slave and made her his mistress. This act inadvertently saved the slave and her offspring from a life of brutal servitude. As one of the slave's descendants, this turn of luck led to Gladwell's relatively successful position in life. Summarizing the publication, Gladwell notes that success "is not exceptional or mysterious. It is grounded in a web of advantages and inheritances, some deserved, some not, some earned, some just plain lucky", and at the end of the book, he remarks, "Outliers wasn't intended as autobiography. But you could read it as an extended apology for my success."

== Style ==
Outliers has been described as a form of autobiography, as Gladwell mixes in elements from his own life into the book to give it a more personal touch. Lev Grossman, writing in Time magazine, called Outliers a "more personal book than its predecessors", noting, "If you hold it up to the light, at the right angle, you can read it as a coded autobiography: a successful man trying to figure out his own context, how success happened to him and what it means." He also surmised that Gladwell feels guilty about his success and believes that Christopher Langan should have experienced the same success that he had.

== Reception ==
Published by Little, Brown and Company on November 18, 2008, Outliers debuted at number one on the bestseller lists for The New York Times in the United States and The Globe and Mail in Canada on November 28, 2008, holding the position on the former for eleven consecutive weeks. Between June 2011, when the paperback version was released, and February 2017, the book made the New York Times bestseller list for paperback nonfiction 232 times.

David A. Shaywitz, reviewing the book in The Wall Street Journal, praised Gladwell's writing style as "iconic", and asserted that "many new nonfiction authors seek to define themselves as the 'Malcolm Gladwell of' their chosen topic." He complimented its clarity and easy grace, but also pointed to these as possible Achilles' heels for Gladwell because of his oversimplification of complex sociological phenomena to "compact, pithy explanations". Furthermore, he praised the book for asking some important questions, such as "How much potential out there is being ignored? How much raw talent remains uncultivated and ultimately lost because we cling to outmoded ideas of what success looks like and what is required to achieve it?"

In a discussion about the book in Slate magazine, John Horgan was particularly moved by Gladwell's family history. He felt that the links between race and achievement were given substantive analysis, but found the lessons mentioned in Outliers to be "oddly anticlimactic, even dispiriting". His contribution concluded by remarking, "Outliers represents a squandered opportunity for Gladwell—himself an outlier, an enormously talented and influential writer and the descendant of an African slave—to make a major contribution to our ongoing discourse about nature, nurture, and race." BusinessWeek gave the book four out of five stars and appreciated its "Aha!" moments, but wondered if Gladwell purposely omits evidence that contradicts his thesis. The review remarked that Outliers was repetitive in parts, but that Gladwell eventually pulls the stories together into an overarching narrative.

Criticism focused on the book's style and oversimplified conceptualizations. Displeased with Gladwell's generalizations drawn from small amounts of data, Roger Gathman wrote in The Austin American-Statesman that this was uncharacteristic of him, and believed that the approach points to a "certain exhaustion in his favorite method". He remarked that in Outliers, the experiments, analyses, and conclusions drawn are too mechanically applied to historical or cultural phenomena to "create a cognitive 'gotcha' moment", that Gladwell's analytical method was no longer working, and that "it's high time for Gladwell to produce something more challenging than his beautifully executed tomb robberies of old sociology papers." Boyd Tonkin in The Independent held a similar opinion, and wondered why Gladwell "does not yet hold a tenured professorship at the University of the Bleedin' Obvious".

Ask A Korean posted a detailed assessment of Outliers' section on the 1997 Korean Air crash, accusing Gladwell of "journalistic malpractice". The blog accuses Gladwell of "stacking the deck" against Korean pilots by listing irrelevant air crashes from KAL's history, as well as truncating the pilots' conversation to suit his book's conclusion. The piece accuses Gladwell of "culturalism", a concept similar to racism, in suggesting that Koreans are inherently prone to air crashes because of their communication style. The If Books Could Kill podcast criticized the book heavily, noting that its section on Korean Air counts instances of crashes caused by North Korean terrorism and Soviet anti-air attacks as examples of Korean incompetence, in a manner that cannot be explained except by intentional journalistic deception. Similarly, the podcast criticized the section on Asian peoples' exceptional math abilities, claiming that it relies on shoddy personal research and draws conclusions which cannot be supported by the data which Gladwell gathered on math scores. The connections of rice farming to math and inability to drive, three of the most common Asian stereotypes, without sufficient data to prove their relevance was accused of edging on racism, if not racial insensitivity, potentially driven by the perceived post-racism of the 1990s.

Jason Cowley, reviewing the book in The Guardian, felt that Outliers was an argument between Gladwell and himself, referring to the many times that he uses the word "we" when defining his position, such as in the example: "There is something profoundly wrong with the way we look at success. ... We cling to the idea that success is a simple function of individual merit and that the world in which we grow up and the rules we choose to write as a society don't matter at all." He also believed that there was a "certain one-dimensional Americanness at work", observing that many of Gladwell's examples are from the United States, particularly in New York City.

In an article about the book for The New York Times, Steven Pinker wrote, "The reasoning in 'Outliers,' which consists of cherry-picked anecdotes, post-hoc sophistry and false dichotomies, had me gnawing on my Kindle." In a review in The New Republic, Isaac Chotiner called the final two chapters of Outliers "impervious to all forms of critical thinking". Author Ulrich Boser criticized the 10,000 hour rule, pointing out that people do not necessarily get superbly good at handwriting or driving despite huge amounts of practice performing those activities. Boser said that feedback, whether from a coach, tutor, or systematic self-observation, was required to make progress, and could result in speedy improvement.

Finding it ironic that Outliers provided suggestions on how to resolve cultural biases, the Sunday Times review by Kevin Jackson agreed that the book itself suffered from an unbalanced focus on American subjects, predicting that this would lead to better sales in the United States than in the United Kingdom. Jackson was disappointed in the book's lack of new ideas, noting that it merely expands on the concept that "you have to be born at the right moment; at the right place; to the right family (posh usually helps); and then you have to work really, really hard. That's about it." He was also skeptical towards Gladwell's arguments for the 10,000-Hour Rule by countering that the Beatles' success had more to do with "the youthful spirit of the age, the vogue for guitar bands and a spark of collaborative chemistry". Regarding the book, Paul McCartney, former member of the Beatles, said in an interview on August 6, 2010:

[...] I've read the book. I think there is a lot of truth in it [...] I mean there were an awful lot of bands that were out in Hamburg who put in 10,000 hours and didn't make it, so it's not a cast-iron theory. I think, however, when you look at a group who has been successful... I think you always will find that amount of work in the background. But I don't think it's a rule that if you do that amount of work, you're going to be as successful as the Beatles.

Case Western Reserve University's assistant professor of psychology Brooke N. Macnamara and colleagues have subsequently performed a comprehensive review of 9,331 research papers about practice relating to acquiring skills. They focused specifically on 88 papers that collected and recorded data about practice times. In their paper, they note regarding the 10,000-hour rule that "This view is a frequent topic of popular-science writing" but "we conducted a meta-analysis covering all major domains in which deliberate practice has been investigated. We found that deliberate practice explained 26% of the variance in performance for games, 21% for music, 18% for sports, 4% for education, and less than 1% for professions. We conclude that deliberate practice is important, but not as important as has been argued".

Sociologist Shayne Lee referenced Outliers in his opinion editorial for CNN.com that commemorated Martin Luther King Jr.'s birthday. Lee discussed the strategic timing of King's ascent from a "Gladwellian" perspective, citing Outliers as the inspiration for his argument.
