= Cautionary Tales (podcast) =

Social science podcast hosted by Tim Harford

- Genre: Educational

Cast and voices
- Hosted by: Tim Harford

Publication
- No. of seasons: 6
- Original release: November 15, 2019
- Provider: Pushkin Industries

Related
- Website: www.pushkin.fm/podcasts/cautionary-tales

Cautionary Tales is a podcast produced by Pushkin Industries and hosted by economic journalist Tim Harford. Each episode presents a story of historical failure and analyzes it for patterns and lessons useful in the current day.

== Background ==
Prior to his work on Cautionary Tales, Harford authored books on economics and wrote a long-running Financial Times column called the Undercover Economist.

Pushkin is a podcast company specializing in social science and the arts, founded by author Malcolm Gladwell and media executive Jacob Weisberg in 2018. In addition to Cautionary Tales, the company produces Gladwell's podcast Revisionist History and author Michael Lewis's Against the Rules.

The podcast launched on Pushkin on November 15, 2019. "We've always warned children by telling them unsettling fairy tales. But my Cautionary Tales are for the education of the grown ups. And my Cautionary Tales are all true," Harford said of the new show. "Together we weave stories of human error, of tragic catastrophes and hilarious fiascos."

In November 2022, Harford presented an episode live at the Bristol Festival of Ideas.

== Format ==
Episodes of the podcast have covered failed scientific breakthroughs and inventions, redundant safety features, human error and other examples of oversights, mistakes and catastrophe. Harford's analysis draws on disciplines such as economics, psychology and sociology.

It often features voice actors who portray historical figures discussed in episodes; cast members have included British actors Alan Cumming, Russell Tovey and Rufus Wright.

== Seasons ==
Season	Episodes	Originally aired	
Season	Episodes	First aired	Last aired
1	14	November 15, 2019	July 17, 2020
2	16	February 26, 2021	October 29, 2021
3	20	March 25, 2022	December 9, 2022
4	31	January 20, 2023	January 30, 2024
5	25	February 2, 2024	December 6, 2024
6	TBD	January 10, 2025	TBD
