= Lois Weisberg =

American socialite (1925–2016)

- Born: Lois Porges; May 6, 1925; Chicago, Illinois, U.S.
- Died: January 13, 2016 (aged 90); Palmetto Bay, Florida, U.S.
- Occupations: Activist, socialite
- Spouse(s): Leonard Solomon (divorced) Bernie Weisberg (died 1999)
- Children: 4

Lois Weisberg (May 6, 1925 – January 13, 2016) was the first Commissioner of Cultural Affairs for the City of Chicago, from 1989 until January 2011.

Weisberg's work as a community activist was profiled by Canadian writer Malcolm Gladwell in a 1999 New Yorker essay, "Six Degrees of Lois Weisberg"; Gladwell called Weisberg a "connector" for her ability to connect people from differing communities, and included the essay about her in his book The Tipping Point. He asked, "She's a grandmother, she lives in a big house in Chicago, and you've never heard of her. Does she run the world?"

Weisberg was appointed by Mayor Harold Washington to head the city's Office of Event Planning (in the Department of Cultural Affairs) in 1983. She helped establish the Gallery 37 program, which gathered Chicago youths to a vacant block in downtown Chicago to make art; she also created the Chicago Blues Festival, the Chicago Gospel Festival, multiple citywide neighborhood festivals, and the Chicago Holiday Sharing It Program. She launched Chicago's Cows on Parade exhibit, the first in the US.

Before her appointment in city government, Weisberg helped found the Chicago Cultural Center and Friends of the Park. She was given many civic and arts awards, including the League of Women Voters Civic Contribution Award, Governing Magazine's Public Official of the Year Award, the Harold Washington History Maker Award, an honorary Doctorate from Chicago's Spertus Institute, and the Chicago Tribune "Chicagoan of the Year" award.

== Family ==
Born Lois Porges in Chicago to a lawyer father and homemaker mother on May 6, 1925, she initially pursued an acting career, but soon realized she would rather work behind the scenes. She married Leonard Solomon, and they had two daughters: Jerilyn [Fyffe] (d. 2011) and Kiki [Ellenby]. She and Solomon divorced, and she married lawyer (and later judge) Bernard Weisberg. They had two sons: Jacob and Joseph (Joe). Jacob became editor of Slate online magazine and co-founded with Gladwell the audio content publisher Pushkin Industries. Joe is a former CIA agent turned television writer-producer. Judge Weisberg died in 1999.

== Awards ==
In 2014, Weisberg received an inaugural Fifth Star award from the City of Chicago.

In a 2009 interview with Chicago Life, she reported not always enjoying the process of fundraising, "Even since I first started with the Shaw celebration in 1956, I've never really liked asking people for money. I don't mind asking people for money for something I'm not involved with, and I bet a lot of people feel that way."

== Death ==
Weisberg died in Palmetto Bay, Florida, aged 90. She had been ill for a short time.
