= James Henry Wittebols =

Canadian academic

James Henry Wittebols (born 1955) is a scholar of television studies, author of books on television series, and professor of communications at the University of Windsor.

== Biography ==
Wittebols received his bachelor's degree in journalism and sociology from Central Michigan University in 1977 and an MA and PhD in sociology from Washington State University in 1979 and 1983, respectively. After several years working as an educational researcher (during which he published a highly cited meta-analysis on class size), he became an assistant professor of communication studies at Niagara University in 1987, was promoted to full professor in 1998, and served as department chair from 1994 to 2000. He moved to the University of Windsor as professor of communication studies and department head in 2004.

== Works ==
- Wittebols, James H. (2003). Watching M*A*S*H, Watching America: A Social History of the 1972–1983 Television Series. Jefferson, North Carolina: McFarland & Company. ISBN 0-7864-1701-3. OCLC 52878918.
- Wittebols, James H. (2004). The Soap Opera Paradigm: Television Programming and Corporate Priorities. Lanham, Maryland: Rowman & Littlefield. ISBN 0-7425-2001-3. OCLC 54446382.
