= Revisionist history =

Revisionist history may refer to:

- Historical revisionism, the reinterpretation of orthodox views on evidence, motivations, and decision-making processes surrounding a historical event
- Historical negationism, sometimes called "historical revisionism" or "revisionist history", the distortion of the historical record such that certain events appear to have occurred and/or impacted history in a way that is in drastic disagreement with the historical record and/or consensus, and usually meant to advance a socio-political view or agenda.
- Revisionist History (podcast), a podcast by Malcolm Gladwell
