= William S. Condon =

American psychologist

William S. Condon is a researcher who investigated human interactions. He developed the concept of situation synchrony.

== Cultural references ==
In Canadian journalist Malcolm Gladwell's 2000 book, The Tipping Point, he cites Condon's research to help explain why some "Salesman" types may contribute more to word-of-mouth cultural 'epidemics'.

Some other reference is made in Flora Davis's book "Inside Intuition-What we know about Non-Verbal Communication" published in New York by McGraw-Hill Books, which talks about the study he did on Interactional Syncrony.

== Works ==
- Condon, W. S. (1996). Sound-Film Microanalysis: A Means for Correlating Brain and Behavior in Persons with Autism. Proceedings of the 1996 Autism Society of America National Conference, Milwaukee, WI, July 1996, 221–225.
- Condon, W. S. (1985). Sound-Film Microanalysis: A Means for Correlating Brain and Behavior. In Frank Duffy and Norman Geschwind (Eds.), Dyslexia: A Neuroscientific Approach to Clinical Evaluation, Boston, MA: Little, Brown & Co., 123–156.
- Condon, W. S. (1974) Cultural Microrhythms. In M. Davis (Ed.), Interaction Rhythms. New York: Human Sciences, 1982.
- Condon, W. S. (1971). Speech and Body Motion Synchrony of the Speaker-Hearer. In D. L. Horton and J. J. Jenkins (Eds.), Perception of Language, Columbus, Ohio: Merrill, 150–173.
- Condon, W. S. (1974). Multiple response to sound in autistic-like children. Proceedings of the National Society for Autistic Children Conference, Washington, DC, June 1974.
- Condon, W. S. and Sander, L. W. (1974). Neonate movement is synchronized with adult speech. Integrated participation and language acquisition. Science 183:99.
- Condon, W. S. (1963) Synchrony units and the communicational hierarchy. Paper presented at Western Psychiatric Institute & Clinics, Pittsburgh, PA
