= Revisionist History (podcast) =

Podcast by Malcolm Gladwell

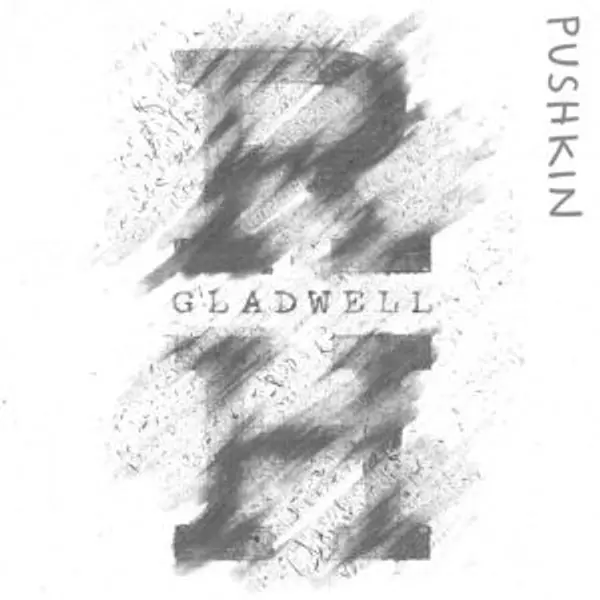
- Genre: History; Society and culture
- Format: MP3
- Country of origin: United States
- Language: American English

Cast and voices
- Hosted by: Malcolm Gladwell

Production
- Production: Pushkin Industries
- Length: 30–40 min.

Publication
- No. of seasons: 13 (as of July 3, 2025)
- No. of episodes: 224
- Original release: June 3, 2016
- Provider: Omny Studio
- Updates: Weekly
- License: Proprietary

Reception
- Ratings: 4.42/5

Related
- Website: www.pushkin.fm/podcasts/revisionist-history

Revisionist History is a podcast by Canadian journalist Malcolm Gladwell, produced by Gladwell's company Pushkin Industries. It first aired on June 3, 2016 and (as of May 2025) has aired thirteen seasons.

Gladwell, already a successful author and essayist, was convinced to create a podcast by his friend Jacob Weisberg, then editor-in-chief of The Slate Group. At that time Slate also operated the Panoply Media podcast network, which produced the first three seasons of the podcast. After Panoply announced that they would cease making podcasts in September 2018, he announced that he was co-founding a podcast production company with Weisberg named Pushkin Industries, which has produced the series since then.

Each episode begins with an inquiry about a person, event, or idea, and proceeds to question the received wisdom about the subject.

== Episodes ==
=== Season 1 (2016) ===
No. overall	No. in season	Title	Central topic	Length (mm:ss)	Original release date
1	—	"Introducing Revisionist History"	Series announcement	3:21	June 3, 2016
Coming soon, a new podcast series from bestselling author Malcolm Gladwell.
2	1	"The Lady Vanishes"	The Roll Call, an 1874 oil-on-canvas painting by Elizabeth Thompson	33:48	June 16, 2016
In the late 19^{th} century, a painting by a virtually unknown artist took England by storm, but after that brilliant first effort the artist all but disappeared. Why? And what does it tell us about the fate of those first through the door? Themes Explored: How success by a member of a minority group does not alleviate discrimination, but rather perpetuates it.
3	2	"Saigon, 1965"	Leon Gouré, Konrad Kellen and the RAND Corporation's recommendations regarding the Vietnam War	41:05	June 22, 2016
In the early stages of the Vietnam War, The Pentagon set up a top-secret research project interviewing captured Viet Cong combatants to measure the effect of U.S. bombing on their morale. Yet despite a wealth of data, even the leaders of the study couldn’t agree on what it meant. Themes Explored: How personal bias can lead to people drawing different conclusions from the same data.
4	3	"The Big Man Can't Shoot"	Wilt Chamberlain, Rick Barry and basketball's underhand free throw	35:05	June 29, 2016
A brilliant NBA career was marred by one, deeply inexplicable decision: a shooting technique that resulted in one of the worst free throw percentages in professional basketball—even though a better alternative existed. Why do smart people do dumb things? Themes Explored: Why smart people sometimes refuse to accept the best ideas.
5	4	"Carlos Doesn't Remember"	Meritocracy in American schools	33:36	July 6, 2016
Of the tens of thousands of talented, low-income students who graduate from high school every year in the U.S., most never make it to universities appropriate to their gifts, leaving an enormous amount of talent on the table every year. Themes Explored: How America is making use of its human capital.
6	5	"Food Fight"	Bowdoin College, Vassar College, and the budgetary choices of colleges	30:07	July 13, 2016
Two elite private schools compete for the same students, but one of those schools is trying hard to address the problem of rich and poor in American society—and paying a high price—while the other is making that problem worse and reaping rewards as a result. Themes Explored: How colleges get rewarded for distorting the educational system.
7	6	"My Little Hundred Million"	The record-breaking Hank Rowan donation to Glassboro State University	39:05	July 20, 2016
In the early 1990s, $100 million was donated to a tiny public university in New Jersey. What was the donor thinking, and why has it proven so difficult for other philanthropists to follow his lead? Themes Explored: The ideologies behind educational philanthropy.
8	7	"Hallelujah"	"Deportee" by Elvis Costello and Paul Cézanne, Pablo Picasso, and Leonard Cohen	36:32	July 27, 2016
How does genius emerge? An exploration of different types of innovation—through the lens of an extraordinary Elvis Costello song: once utterly forgettable and then, through time and iteration, a work of beauty and genius. Themes Explored: The role of time and repetition in the creation of works of genius.
9	8	"Blame Game"	The 2009–11 Toyota vehicle recalls	37:46	August 3, 2016
In 2009, hundreds of Toyota owners reported that their cars were suddenly and uncontrollably accelerating, forcing the company to recall 10 million vehicles, pay a fine of more than $1 billion, and settle countless lawsuits. The consensus was that something was badly wrong with the world’s most popular cars, except it wasn’t. What happens when hysteria overtakes common sense? Themes Explored: Human perception and misconception, our fraught relationship to technology, media dishonesty.
10	9	"Generous Orthodoxy"	Chester Wenger, the Mennonite minister who confronted his own church	32:56	August 10, 2016
A 98-year-old minister takes on his church over the subject of gay marriage—and teaches the rest of us what it means to stand up in protest. Themes Explored: Effective ways of dissent.
11	10	"The Satire Paradox"	Harry Enfield and his creation of the Loadsamoney character	36:50	August 17, 2016
In the political turmoil of mid-1990s Britain, a brilliant young comedian set out to satirize the ideology and politics of Margaret Thatcher, becoming famous for his vicious sendup of the typical Thatcherite nouveau riche buffoon. In an age dominated by political comedy, are laughter and social protest friends or foes? Themes Explored: How satire with the aim of social protest can backfire.

=== Season 2 (2017) ===
No. overall	No. in season	Title	Central topic	Length (mm:ss)	Original release date
12	—	"Introducing Revisionist History Season Two"	Season announcement	2:59	May 26, 2017
From bestselling author Malcolm Gladwell, season two of Revisionist History launches June 15^{th}, 2017.
13	1	"A Good Walk Spoiled"	Golf and golf clubs	34:03	June 15, 2017
Rich people and their addiction to golf: a philosophical investigation. Themes Explored: Property taxes, real estate, CEO productivity.
14	2	"The Road To Damascus"	The CIA's use of former terrorists as informants; the relationship between a security agency and a free press	40:00	June 22, 2017
What happens when a terrorist has a change of heart? Themes Explored: Forgiveness and second chances; transparency vs. security.
15	3	"Miss Buchanan's Period of Adjustment"	Brown v. Board of Education	30:39	June 29, 2017
A landmark Supreme Court case. A civil rights revolution. Why has everyone forgotten what happened next? Themes Explored: The "persistent" legacy of racism in American schools.
16	4	"The Foot Soldier of Birmingham"	A sculpture, The Foot Soldier, by Ronald McDowell as based on a photograph by Bill Hudson	34:31	July 6, 2017
“Oh, Mac. What did you do?” Themes Explored: Artistic license, and the sanitizing of history.
17	5	"The Prime Minister and the Prof"	The friendship between Winston Churchill and Lord Cherwell; the 1943 Bengal famine	34:12	July 13, 2017
The friendship that changed the course of World War II. Themes Explored: How friendships affect people in power.
18	6	"The King of Tears"	Country music as illustrated by an interview with prolific songwriter Bobby Braddock	41:43	July 20, 2017
Why country music makes you cry and rock and roll doesn’t: a musical interpretation of a divided America. Themes Explored: Sad country songs, as compared to general levity of the rock and roll genre.
19	7	"State v Johnson"	African Americans and the U.S. justice system	31:25	July 27, 2017
“Nobody was interested in justice.” Themes Explored: Institutional racism in the United States and related power dynamics.
20	8	"Mr. Hollowell Didn't Like That"	An extended interview with Vernon Jordan about his work with Donald L. Hollowell	35:23	August 3, 2017
Arrested, arraigned, indicted, tried, convicted, and sentenced to die in the electric chair in 24 hours. Themes Explored: Institutional racism in the U.S. and related power dynamics.
21	9	"McDonald's Broke My Heart"	McDonald's decision to stop frying its french fries in beef tallow	34:02	August 10, 2017
They made the world’s greatest french fry, then they threw it away. Themes Explored: The link between saturated fats and heart disease, the power of individual persistence.
22	10	"The Basement Tapes"	Dr. Ivan Frantz's "Minnesota Coronary Experiment" on the effects of vegetable oil in cholesterol reduction	30:54	August 17, 2017
What is a son’s obligation to his father? Themes Explored: Medical effects of animal fats/vegetable oils and father/son relationships.

=== Season 3 (2018) ===
No. overall	No. in season	Title	Central topic	Length (mm:ss)	Original release date
23	—	"Introducing Revisionist History Season Three"	Season announcement	2:35	May 3, 2018
Malcolm Gladwell is back with season three of Revisionist History: harmonica players, mass delusion, semicolons, and a constitutional crisis. Launching May 17^{th}, 2018 on Panoply.
24	—	"Malcolm Gladwell debates Adam Grant"	Special live taping at the 92nd Street Y in New York City of a talk with Adam Grant	50:42	May 10, 2018
Why Malcolm thinks we shouldn't root for the underdog. Themes Explored: Avoiding highly undesirable tasks and what makes an idea interesting.
25	1	"Divide and Conquer"	The semicolon	38:15	May 17, 2018
The complete, unabridged history of the world’s most controversial semicolon. Themes Explored: The impact of grammar in case law and law reviews by Michael Stokes Paulsen.
26	2	"Burden of Proof"	The story of college football player Owen Thomas and chronic traumatic encephalopathy	33:13	May 24, 2018
“He called to wish me ‘Happy Birthday,’ then he said, ‘I’m failing everything.’” Themes Explored: Why we should sometimes act before having concrete proof.
27	3	"A Polite Word for Liar"	Harmonica player Larry Adler's recollections of his eventful life	36:35	May 31, 2018
An early-morning raid, a house full of Nazis, the world’s greatest harmonica player and an undercover spy. Themes Explored: The unreliable nature of memory.
28	4	"Free Brian Williams"	News presenter Brian Williams's fall from grace after inaccuracies are found in his reported reminiscences	36:24	June 7, 2018
"Sorry dude, I don't remember you being on my aircraft." Themes Explored: The unreliable nature of memory (continued).
29	5	"General Chapman's Last Stand"	The impact of Gen. Leonard F. Chapman Jr. in securing the borders of the United States	34:03	June 14, 2018
Good fences make good neighbors…or maybe not. Themes Explored: American immigration policy, and whether good fences make good neighbors.
30	6	"The Hug Heard Round The World"	Sammy Davis Jr. and his relationship with Richard Nixon	37:47	June 21, 2018
Q: Was there a period where you felt you had something to prove? A: The first 45 years of my life. Themes Explored: Race and tokenism, especially with public figures.
31	7	"Malcolm Gladwell's 12 Rules for Life"	The mathematics of 'pulling the goalie' in hockey and its broader applications in life	42:40	June 28, 2018
Crucial life lessons from the end of hockey games, Idris Elba and some Wall Street guys with a lot of time on their hands. Themes Explored: Self-help manuals and disagreeableness.
32	8	"The Imaginary Crimes of Margit Hamosh"	Suspected scientific misconduct in the work of Professor Margit Hamosh and the work of the U.S. Office of Research Integrity	32:59	July 5, 2018
Epidemics of fear repeat themselves—the first time as tragedy, the second as farce. Themes Explored: Mass psychogenic illnesses, also known as fear epidemics.
33	9	"Strong Verbs, Short Sentences"	The battle between NIH director Bernadine Healy and Congressman John Dingell	39:31	July 12, 2018
“She was Joan of Arc, Madame Curie, and Florence Nightingale—all wrapped up in one.” Themes Explored: The policing of scientific research and fear epidemics (continued).
34	10	"Analysis, Parapraxis, Elvis"	Statistical inference of lyrical lapses in Elvis' performances and their correlation to his state of mind	51:21	July 19, 2018
The one song "The King" couldn’t sing. Themes Explored: Parapraxis, Elvis Presley and the performance psychology.
35	—	"Revisionist History Presents: Rick Rubin"	Partner series promotion	50:22	November 13, 2018
The first episode of Broken Record, a new podcast, containing a conversation between Rick Rubin and Malcolm Gladwell that covers everything from Rick’s role in the emergence of hip-hop to his role in introducing Johnny Cash to a new generation. Themes Explored: History of contemporary music.

=== Season 4 (2019) ===
No. overall	No. in season	Title	Central topic	Length (mm:ss)	Original release date
36	—	"Introducing Revisionist History Season Four"	Season announcement	2:40	June 13, 2019
Jesuits, chess masters, mafiosi, lawyers and a little bit of tire fire.
37	1	"Puzzle Rush"	The LSAT and its ability to judge potential law students	34:48	June 20, 2019
Malcolm challenges his assistant Camille to the Law School Admissions Test but runs out of time halfway through and panics; now he wonders: why does the legal world want him to rush? Themes Explored: Measuring human ability using standardized tests.
38	2	"The Tortoise and the Hare"	Malcolm Gladwell's Grand Unified Theory for fixing higher education in the United States	38:39	June 27, 2019
A weird speech by Antonin Scalia, a visit with some serious legal tortoises and a testy exchange with the experts at the Law School Admission Council. Themes Explored: Meritocracy, standardized tests and the Tortoise and the Hare.
39	3	"Tempest in a Teacup"	The Boston Tea Party's actual relationship to the American Revolution	35:09	July 4, 2019
Bohea, the aroma of tire fire, Mob Wives, smugglers, “bro” tea and what it all means to the backstory of the American Revolution. Themes Explored: Rhetoric vs. reality in national history, plus crime and its political influence.
40	4	"Good Old Boys"	Randy Newman's album Good Old Boys and its message about race in America and the civil rights movement	38:53	July 11, 2019
If you disagree with someone—if what they think is appalling to you—is there any value in talking to them? In the early 1970s, the talk show host Dick Cavett, the governor of Georgia Lester Maddox, and the singer Randy Newman tried to answer this question. Themes Explored: The value of eristic discourse between people who disagree and how conflict inspires creativity.
41	5	"The Standard Case"	Andy Pettitte's baseball career and maritime fines, examined using Jesuit problem solving (casuistry)	36:40	July 18, 2019
Making sense of performance-enhancing substance use in baseball using the 500-year-old moral reasoning methods of Ignatius of Loyola. (Part 1 of 3); Themes Explored: How we deal with novel problems.
42	6	"Dr. Rock's Taxonomy"	Dr. John Rock, inventor of the birth control pill, and how Catholicism informed his views on birth control	37:20	July 25, 2019
John Rock wanted his church to approve of his invention, but what happens when a layman takes on the Vatican? (Part 2 of 3); Themes Explored: Casuist rationalizations.
43	7	"Descend into the Particular"	Jesuit philosophy as applied to U.S. police-involved shootings, particularly the killing of Michael Brown	41:12	August 1, 2019
An unarmed man is shot to death by police. How does the Jesuit concept of “disordered attachment” help us make sense of it? (Part 3 of 3); Themes Explored: The importance of narrative paradigms.
44	8	"In a Metal Mood"	Pat Boone's album In a Metal Mood, plus Taco Bell and its relationship to authentic Mexican cuisine	38:40	August 8, 2019
Two seasons after its investigation of McDonald's french fries, the show returns to fast food’s high-tech test kitchens. Themes Explored: The difference between Elvis' cultural appropriation of black music and inspired innovation.
45	9	"Chutzpah vs. Chutzpah"	The phenomenon of chutzpah and its definitions in case studies from the U.S. and Israel	37:26	August 15, 2019
You thought that there was only one kind of chutzpah. Wrong, there’s two, as proven by the story of a Mafia showdown with a legendary Hollywood producer. Themes Explored: Audacity vs. shamelessness.
46	10	"The Obscure Virus Club"	Howard Temin and how the discovery of retroviruses like Rous sarcoma and HIV/AIDS affected our understanding of molecular biology	36:03	August 22, 2019
A bedtime story about how we should be freed by our doubts, not imprisoned by them. Themes Explored: The power of persistence, and the effect of dogma on scientific progress.
47	11	"The Queen of Cuba"	How espionage leverages human nature, Tim Levine's studies of deception, and the Milgram experiment	59:00	August 29, 2019
A strange chain of events precedes the 1996 shootdown of Brothers to the Rescue aircraft, and intelligence agencies turn to a rising star in the DIA, Ana Montes, known around Washington as the “Queen of Cuba” for her insights into the Castro regime. (This episode is a chapter from the audiobook version of Malcolm Gladwell's 2019 book Talking to Strangers.); Themes Explored: Truth-default theory and the nature of deception.

=== Season 5 (2020) ===
No. overall	No. in season	Title	Central topic	Length (mm:ss)	Original release date
48	—	"Revisionist History Presents: The Limits of Power"	Partner series promotion	44:33	June 2, 2020
A chapter from Malcolm Gladwell's 2013 book David and Goliath, featuring an analysis of how the Northern Irish police's reaction to the 1969 religious riots in Belfast led to a 30-year conflict called "The Troubles."; Themes Explored: Using power wisely and the consequences of failing to do so.
49	—	"Introducing Revisionist History Season Five"	Season announcement	2:45	June 4, 2020
Andy Warhol, war, Smaug the Dragon and other digressions of great importance.
50	1	"Dragon Psychology 101"	Andy Warhol, J. R. R. Tolkien, and the policies of the Metropolitan Museum of Art	41:13	June 18, 2020
Dragons hoard treasure deep in their lairs and don’t show it off to their neighbors; aspects of this psychology are also relevant in the strange world of art museums. Themes Explored: Hoarding, Attachment theory, relationships, and memory through objects.
51	2	"Hedwig's Lost Van Gogh"	Van Gogh's "Vase with White and Red Carnations," and other MacGuffins	39:47	June 25, 2020
An escape from war-torn Germany, lavish dinners with Hollywood royalty, a Swedish baron and a dime store heiress: the long journey of a still life painting. Themes Explored: Value theory and hoarding as applied to the curation of museum collections.
52	3	"The Powerball Revolution"	Adam Cronkright's idea of democratic lotteries and other theories about predictions	41:17	July 2, 2020
In Bolivia, a political activist radically reforms the voting process for…student council elections. Who else does he convince? Maybe a fancy private school in New Jersey. Themes Explored: Elections, lotteries and our ability to predict effective traits for performing vs. governing.
53	4	"The Bomber Mafia"	Curtis LeMay, the "Bomber Mafia" and the development of the B-29 bomber	32:16	July 9, 2020
On the eve of World War II, a band of visionaries at Maxwell Air Force Base tried to reimagine modern warfare. They failed. (Part 1 of 4); Themes Explored: American innovation and technological obsession, as applied to military airpower.
54	5	"May the Best Firebomb Win"	Hoyt Hottel's "firebomb bake-off", Louis Fieser and the development of napalm as an offensive weapon	36:57	July 16, 2020
Basement laboratories, mad scientists, sticky gels and a bake-off in the desert: the strange story behind Curtis LeMay’s weapon of choice. (Part 2 of 4); Themes Explored: Scientific innovation in modern warfare.
55	6	"Bombs-Away LeMay"	Area bombardment and the events leading up to Operation Meetinghouse	39:49	July 23, 2020
The arguments, accidents, cold-blooded logic and sheer serendipity that led to the longest night of World War II. (Part 3 of 4); Themes Explored: Leadership, adaptability, ethics, and problem solving in times of conflict.
56	7	"Goodbye, Farewell and Amen"	Aftermath of the firebombing of Tokyo and the legacy of incendiaries in modern warfare, told through M*A*S*H	39:38	July 30, 2020
How do we remember one of the deadliest nights in human history? We don't. (Part 4 of 4); Themes Explored: The legacy of ethically dubious weapons, and how we view atrocities and conflicts of our national past.
57	8	"Hamlet Was Wrong"	Laurence Peter's hierarchical management theory, the Peter principle	38:21	August 6, 2020
The delicate science of hiring nihilism, examined in five deeply-personal case studies. Themes Explored: Social practices and practical implications in hiring, and potential advantages of nihilism.
58	9	"'Oh Howard, You Idiot!'"	Clifford Irving's hoax autobiography, the influence of public image, and the real Howard Hughes	45:41	August 13, 2020
A billionaire-turned-recluse befriends a minor novelist and together they seize the public’s imagination with the greatest autobiography you’ve never read. Themes Explored: How people manage their image, the power of fiction and public perception.
59	10	"A Memorial for the Living"	Homelessness in Jacksonville and management of memories — "a gorgeous mausoleum for the dead, a scatter plot for the living”	39:13	August 20, 2020
Lessons from the world’s most perfect memorial. Themes Explored: Attachment to memories and memorials, and what we collectively choose to remember.
60	—	"Druid Hills"	Non-human primates and rodents	31:35	December 10, 2020
A tour of Emory University before dusting off an old television pilot for a dramatic reenactment.
61	—	"Return to the 404"	Jamaica, Kenya, courtside NBA games and fine art forgery	35:44	December 17, 2020
Malcolm finally gets his big break in the advertising industry.

=== Season 6 (2021) ===
No. in season	Title	Original release date
1	"I Love You Waymo"	June 24, 2021
Central Topic: The future of automobiles, cities, and pedestrians, explored through Waymo's development of autonomous cars. Themes Explored: How we predict the future of technology; madman theory as it relates to pedestrians.
2	"Lord of the Rankings (Rankings part 1)"	July 1, 2021
Central Topic: How U.S. News & World Report ranks colleges and universities in the US, and the flaws in how its algorithm ranks schools. Themes Explored: The power of algorithms and ranking in our perceptions of institutions; how our personal biases can influence peer-rankings and the algorithms we create.
3	"Project Dillard (Rankings part 2)"	July 8, 2021
Central Topic: Dillard University, and how US News & World Report's college rankings misses and misuses data to misidentify HBCUs and other schools. Themes Explored: The power of algorithms in our perceptions, racial biases and privilege, and how holistic evaluations can change our perceptions.
4	"The Judgement of Helen Levitt"	July 15, 2021
Central Topic: Former screenwriter Helen Levitt (wife of Alfred Lewis Levitt), and the effect of her blacklisting during the Red Scare. Themes Explored: How our society chooses to judge others, and the underestimated effect of social exclusion.
5	"Little Mermaid Part 1: The Golden Contract"	July 22, 2021
Central Topic: The story presented in Disney's animated film The Little Mermaid, compared to the original story. Themes Explored: Law, themes, and “moral sloppiness” in entertainment portrayals of older stories.
6	"Little Mermaid Part 2: The Fairytale Twist"	July 29, 2021
Central Topic: The Little Mermaid vs. The Little Mermaid; Themes Explored:
7	"Little Mermaid Part 3: Honestly Ever After"	August 2, 2021
Central Topic: The Little Mermaid vs. The Little Mermaid; Themes Explored:
8	"Laundry Done Right"	August 12, 2021
Central Topic: Habits and practices for doing laundry; Procter & Gamble's effort to make environmentally friendly consumer products. Themes Explored: The environmental effects of laundry and the tradeoffs for our habits and sustainable practices.
9	"A Serious Game"	August 18, 2021
Central Topic: To better prepare for the unexpected may not make plans, but to play games. Themes Explored:
10	"The Dog will See you now"	August 26, 2021
Central Topic: In recent times, most problems can't be solved by humans alone. Themes Explored:

=== Season 7 (2022) ===
No. in season	Title	Original release date
1	"The Magic Wand Experiment"	June 22, 2022
Central Topic: What experiments would experts conduct if they didn't have to worry about ethics, finances, or other barriers? Themes Explored:
2	"Way to Go, Ohio"	June 30, 2022
Central Topic: Akron, Ohio helped us learn about the benefits of iodized salt. What else could be distributed via salt? Themes Explored:
3	"In Triplicate"	July 7, 2022
Central Topic: Themes Explored:
4	"Star Struck"	July 14, 2022
Central Topic: The impact of media on societal beliefs and actions. Themes Explored:
5	"When Will Met Grace"	July 21, 2022
Central Topic: How a single television show, Will & Grace, shaped societal beliefs. Themes Explored: Explicit
6	"“I Was A Stranger and You Welcomed Me”"	July 28, 2022
Central Topic: The importance of everyday acts of kindness. Themes Explored:
7	"Outliers, Revisited"	September 14, 2022
Central Topic: Themes Explored:
8	"The Department of Physiological Hygiene"	September 21, 2022
Central Topic: Themes Explored:
9	"The Rise of the Guinea Pigs"	September 28, 2022
Central Topic: Exploration of the Minnesota Starvation Experiment. Themes Explored:
10	"The Mennonite National Anthem"	October 5, 2022
Central Topic: The long-term impacts of the Minnesota Starvation Experiment. Themes Explored:

=== Season 8 (2023) ===
No. in season	Title	Original release date
N/A	"From Broken Record: Rick Rubin in Conversation with Malcolm Gladwell"	January 25, 2023
Central Topic: Rick Rubin discusses how to cultivate creative authenticity and discover your unique voice. Themes Explored: How to be authentically ourselves.
1	"A Treat for the Die-Hards"	February 15, 2023
Central Topic: How a narrative ends may be more important than anything else. Themes Explored:
2	"Rodents and Red Wine with Maria Konnikova"	July 8, 2023
Central Topic: Maria reads letters from listeners and discusses various topics with Malcolm. Themes Explored:
3	"Started From The Bottom with Justin Richmond"	March 15, 2023
Central Topic: Malcolm and Justin discuss their paths to success and the obstacles they overcame. Themes Explored: Biracial identities, racism Explicit
4	"Higher Animals with Michael Specter"	April 5, 2023
Central Topic: The future of life on Earth given the current scientific revolution. Themes Explored:
5	"Malcolm Goes to Debate School"	July 29, 2023
Central Topic: Munk Debates; Themes Explored: Explicit
6	"The Mystery of Mastery with Adam Gopnik"	May 17, 2023
Central Topic: Adam discusses his book, The Real Work: On the Mystery of Mastery, in which he talks to experts about the secrets behind their mastery and the lessons learned. Themes Explored:
7	"The Crisis in Girls' Sports with Lauren Fleshman and Linda Flanagan"	May 24, 2023
Central Topic: Athletes Linda and Lauren discuss how to make sports more enjoyable for girls and women. Themes Explored:
8	"The Pushkin Prize for Egregiously Deceptive Self-Promotion"	June 8, 2023
Central Topic: The Pushkin Prize and the university that fought back against the US News & World Report rankings to their own detriment. Themes Explored:
9	"Feeling A Bit Attacked with Maria Konnikova"	June 21, 2023
Central Topic: Maria and Malcolm respond to letters about debate and explicit language in podcasts. Themes Explored: Explicit
10	"A Good Circle"	June 28, 2023
Central Topic: Solving problems in higher education. Themes Explored:
11	"Acting Out"	June 21, 2023
Central Topic: Themes Explored:
12	"Taxonomy of the Modern Mystery Story"	July 26, 2023
Central Topic: How modern mystery stories impact our perceptions of policing. Themes Explored:
13	"Guns Part 1: The Sudden Celebrity of Sir John Knight"	August 31, 2023
Central Topic: Sir John Knight and his impact on modern-day gun policy. Themes Explored:
14	"Guns Part 2: Getting out of Dodge"	September 7, 2023
Central Topic: The relationship between Gunsmoke and modern-day gun policy. Themes Explored:
15	"Guns Part 3: A Shooting Lesson"	September 14, 2023
Central Topic: What makes an AR-15 scarier than other guns? Themes Explored:
16	"Guns Part 4: Moral Hazard"	September 21, 2023
Central Topic: Exploring 'what-ifs' in relation to the US's relationship to guns, including homicides, medication, and the assassination of JFK; Themes Explored:
17	"Guns Part 5: The Footnote"	September 28, 2023
Central Topic: Themes Explored:
18	"Guns Part 6: "Sin is the failure to bother to care""	October 5, 2023
Central Topic: Themes Explored:
19	"Silicon Valley on the Couch"	October 19, 2023
Central Topic: Themes Explored:
20	"Unlocking Hidden Potential with Adam Grant"	October 26, 2023
Central Topic: Themes Explored:
21	"The Bear Was Poked with Maria Konnikova"	November 2, 2023
Central Topic: Themes Explored:
22	"This Is Your Captain Speaking"	November 16, 2023
Central Topic: Themes Explored:
23	"Board Game Season"	December 21, 2023
Central Topic: Themes Explored:
24	"Revision History LIVE with Nate Berkus"	February 26, 2024
Central Topic: Themes Explored:

=== Season 9 (2024) ===
The season Development Hell interviewed notable screenwriters and film directors about a passion project which never came to fruition.

No. in season	Title	Original release date
1	"Blink with Stephen Gaghan: Development Hell"	February 29, 2024
Central Topic: Gladwell and screenwriter Gaghan speak about their attempts to adapt Gladwell's book Blink. Themes Explored:
2	"The Variable Man with Gary Goldman and Angus Fletcher: Development Hell"	February 29, 2024
Central Topic: Goldman and Fletcher speak about their attempt to adapt a science-fiction novel by Philip K. Dick. Themes Explored:
3	"Bubbles with Isaac Adamson | Development Hell"	March 7, 2024
Central Topic: Adamson speaks about his screenplay biopic of Michael Jackson, told from the perspective of Jackson's pet chimpanzee Bubbles. Themes Explored:
4	"The Birthday Party with Charles Randolph | Development Hell"	March 14, 2024
Central Topic: The Big Short screenwriter Randolph speaks about his screenplay based on the true story of an interracial kidnapping. Themes Explored:
5	"I Am Superman with Patty Jenkins | Development Hell"	March 21, 2024
Central Topic: Jenkins speaks about her R-rated screenplay about a dog program in prison. Themes Explored:
6	"Labor of Love with M. Night Shyamalan | Development Hell"	March 28, 2024
Central Topic: Shyamalan speaks about his romantic drama, a departure from the psychological thrillers for which he's most famous. Themes Explored:
7	"Blue Seattle with Cameron Crowe | Development Hell"	April 11, 2024
Central Topic: Crowe speaks about his musical movie about Elvis Presley, including playing several songs. Themes Explored:

=== Season 10 (2024) ===
This season was titled Hitler's Olympics and talked about the antecedents to and controversies regarding the 1936 Summer Olympics, particularly focusing on how Hitler used the games as a mouthpiece for Nazi ideology.

No. in season	Title	Original release date
1	"Hitler's Olympics Part 1: The Blue-Eyed Tornado"	June 27, 2024
Central Topic: 1936 Summer Olympics; Themes Explored: Dorothy Thompson and Nazi sympathy in the United States
2	"Hitler's Olympics Part 2: Pangloss, Polonius, Prufrock"	July 4, 2024
Central Topic: 1936 Summer Olympics; Themes Explored: US IOC Representative Charles H. Sherrill
3	"Hitler's Olympics, Part 3: Mustache to Mustache"	July 11, 2024
Central Topic: 1936 Summer Olympics; Themes Explored: Jewish athletes
4	"Hitler's Olympics, Part 4: Outcast in Olympia"	July 18, 2024
Central Topic: 1936 Summer Olympics; Themes Explored: Former IOC president Avery Brundage
5	"Hitler's Olympics, Part 5: The Amateur's Hour"	July 25, 2024
Central Topic: 1936 Summer Olympics; Themes Explored: Participation of Jewish athletes
6	"Hitler's Olympics, Part 6: The Jiggle & the Giddy Up"	August 1, 2024
Central Topic: 1936 Summer Olympics; Themes Explored: The supposed friendship between US athlete Jesse Owens and German athlete Luz Long
7	"Hitler's Olympics, Part 7: Long Jump, Tall Tale"	August 8, 2024
Central Topic: 1936 Summer Olympics; Themes Explored: The supposed friendship between Jesse Owens and Luz Long
8	"Hitler's Olympics, Part 8: "Vater, it is to be Fayetteville""	August 15, 2024
Central Topic: 1936 Summer Olympics; Themes Explored: Impact of Jim Crow-era race laws in the southern US on the racial policy of Nazi Germany
9	"Hitler's Olympics, Part 9: A Plague on Both Your Houses."	August 22, 2024

=== Season 11 (2024) ===
The first part of this season was a miniseries titled The Tipping Point Revisited, in which Gladwell revisits his 2000 book The Tipping Point and looks at it from a new stance.

No. in season	Title	Original release date
1	"The Tipping Point Revisited: Georgetown Massacre Part 1"	October 3, 2024
Central Topic: The Tipping Point; Themes Explored: Varsity Blues scandal
2	"The Tipping Point Revisited: Georgetown Massacre Part 2"	October 10, 2024
Central Topic: The Tipping Point; Themes Explored: Varsity Blues scandal
3	"The Tipping Point Revisited: Live with David Remnick"	October 17, 2024
Central Topic: The Tipping Point; Themes Explored: Malcolm talks with David Remnick about his love of storytelling from a young age and his past work, including The Tipping Point.
4	"The Tipping Point Revisited: Broken Windows"	October 24, 2024
Central Topic: The Tipping Point; Themes Explored: Malcolm's audit on the chapter on the broken windows theory in The Tipping Point

=== Season 12 (2026) ===
The Mistakes Series is inspired by the book, From Mistakes to Meaning: Owning Your Past So It Doesn't Own You by Joshua L. Steiner and Michael Lynton; one of Malcom Gladwell's closest friends. Much like the book, the series begins at the 2014 Sony Pictures hack; both projects examine the origins of personal mistakes and their consequences on the people who made them.

March 2026 - Zootopia Exposed! describes the plot of Zootopia was stolen from screenwriter Gary Goldman but then that Walt Disney Animation Studios used the plot of Zootopia 2to apologize to Goldman.

== Reception ==
Revisionist History has received positive reviews from critics. In Podcast Review, Nic Dobija-Nootens called it "perplexing, frustrating, and always worth a second look". The New York Times's Amanda Hess praises the show's impact, crediting it for creating a "podcast micro-genre … [of] history-bending show[s]".

== See also ==
- List of history podcasts
