= Michael Specter =

American journalist (born 1955)

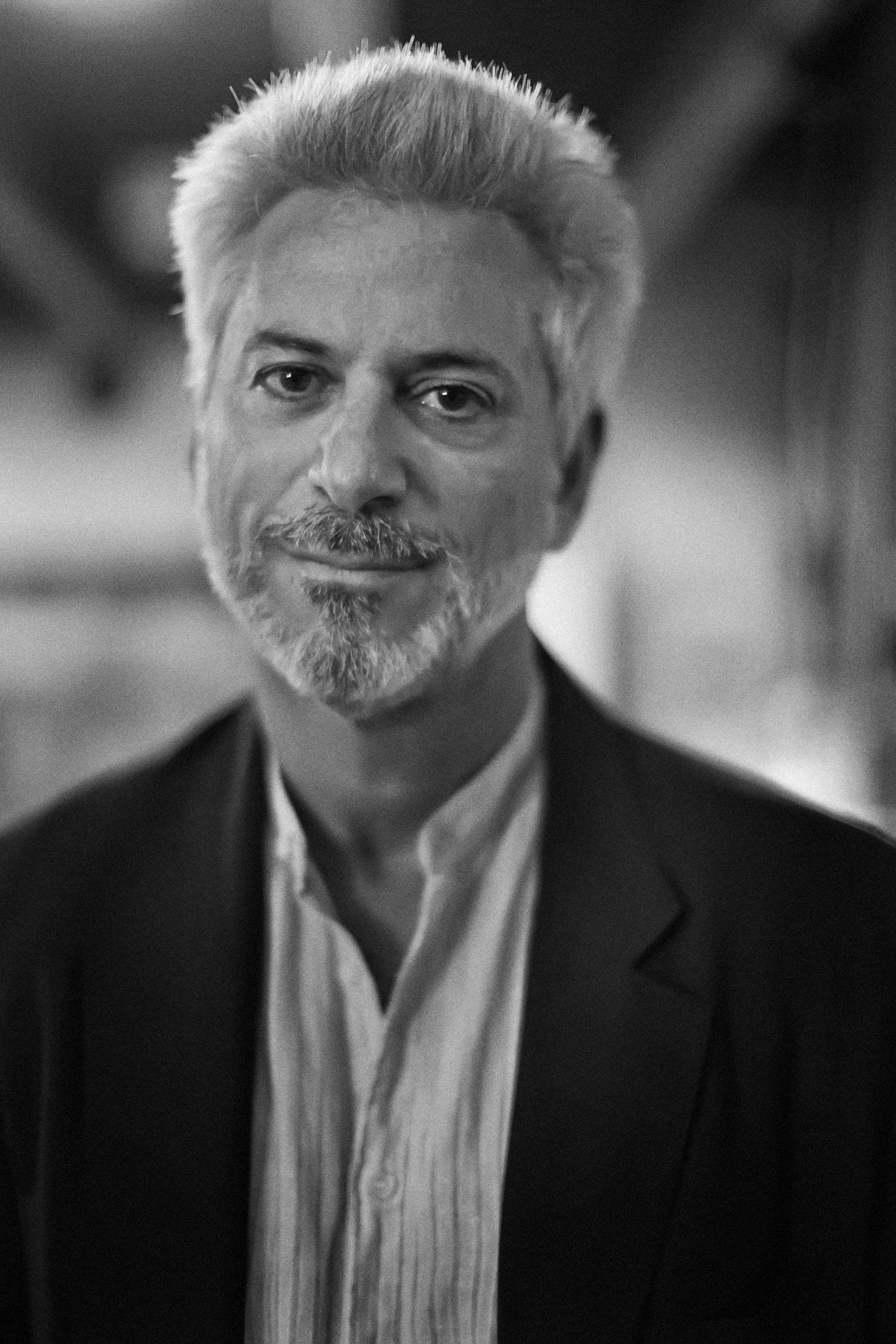
- Born: 1955 (age 70–71); U.S.
- Education: Vassar College (A.B., 1977)
- Spouse: Alessandra Stanley (former)
- Children: 1
- Website: www.michaelspecter.com

Michael Specter (born 1955) is an American journalist who has been a staff writer, focusing on science, technology, and global public health at The New Yorker since September 1998. He has also written for The Washington Post and The New York Times. Since 2021 he has also taught writing and, along with a colleague, a course called “Safeguarding the Future” at MIT. He has taught bioengineering as an adjunct instructor at Stanford University and environmental and urban studies as a visiting professor at Bard College.

== Career ==
Specter initially covered local news at The Washington Post in 1985 but then became a national science reporter for the Post and finally the New York City bureau chief. In 1991, Specter transferred to The New York Times. From 1994 to 1998, he was based in Moscow and was appointed co-chief of the Times Moscow bureau in 1995. While in Russia, he covered stories such as the war in Chechnya, the 1996 Russian presidential elections, and the declining state of Russian health care. In 1998, he became a roving correspondent based in Rome and covered topics as varied as Europe's demographic crisis, Michelangelo's Florentine Pietà, and the spread of AIDS in Africa.

His 2009 book, Denialism: How Irrational Thinking Hinders Scientific Progress, Harms the Planet, and Threatens Our Lives, explores the ways in which people in the United States and Europe have increasingly rejected scientific truths, backed by impressive data. They instead are embracing what often seem to be more comfortable fictions about issues such as the value of organic food, vaccine safety, and personal genomics. Specter delivered a TEDtalk titled "The danger of science denial" at TED 2010.

His original audiobook, Higher Animals: Vaccines, Synthetic Biology and the Future of Life, was published by Pushkin Industries in March 2023. In it, Specter explores the ways biology — symbolized most recently by the rapid development of the wholly synthetic mRNA vaccines — is essentially become a form of information technology, but instead of using the common bits and bytes of the digital world, it uses an alphabet based on the genetic code of DNA.

During the COVID-19 pandemic, Specter wrote and narrated Fauci, an audiobook published by Pushkin, about Dr. Anthony Fauci, the director of the National Institute of Allergy and Infectious Diseases.

At The New Yorker, he has written about the global AIDS epidemic, avian influenza, malaria, scientific efforts to resurrect extinct viruses, synthetic biology, genetically modified food, efforts to mine the human genome to fight disease, and the world's diminishing freshwater resources. He has also written profiles of many people, including Dr. Oz, Lance Armstrong, Richard Branson, the ethicist Peter Singer, P. Diddy, Manolo Blahnik, AIDS activist Larry Kramer, and PETA founder Ingrid Newkirk.

Two months prior to the COVID-19 pandemic, Specter hosted a meeting at the Milken Institute School of Public Health titled "Universal Flu Vaccine" (dated October 29, 2019) with Anthony Fauci and several other government officials. In this meeting, Specter asked the attendees about the prospect of "disrupting" egg-based flu vaccine production with newer technologies. Although later debunked by Reuters, rumors spread through social media, using clips from this meeting taken out of context as evidence, that Specter and Fauci collaborated to produce a new influenza virus (in some versions of the rumor, SARS‑CoV‑2) to compel governments to adopt a universal mandate for flu vaccination. The timing of the meeting, along with soundbites of Specter asking whether we must "blow the system up" (in reference to traditional vaccine manufacturing vs developing newer manufacturing methods) or to create an "aura of excitement" and "make influenza sexy" in order to revive government funding, may have contributed to the virality of this rumor.

== Awards ==
In 1996, Specter was awarded the Overseas Press Club Citation for Excellence for his coverage of the War in Chechnya. In 2002, he won the A.A.A.S. Science Journalism Award. He has also twice received the Global Health Council's Annual Excellence in Media Award- for his piece about AIDS in India, "India's Plague" (12/17/01) and for one about AIDS and the population crisis in Russia, "The Devastation".

In 2009, Specter received the Robert P. Balles Annual Prize in Critical Thinking for his book Denialism. The yearly award is given by the Committee for Skeptical Inquiry to the author of the published work that best exemplifies healthy skepticism, logical analysis, or empirical science.

Specter received the 2014 Mirror Prize for best Profile, from the Newhouse School of Communication, for "The Operator," about Mehmet Oz. In 2015 he received a James Beard Award for his New Yorker article “Against the Grain,’’ about America's obsessive fear of gluten. His 2020 audiobook Fauci received AudioFile Magazine’s Earphones Award for excellence.

== Personal ==
Specter is a son of Howard and Eileen Specter. He was previously married to Alessandra Stanley, a former television critic for The New York Times. They have one daughter, Emma.

Specter is a 1977 graduate of Vassar College, where he majored in English.

== Bibliography ==
=== Books ===
- Specter, Michael (2009). Denialism : how irrational thinking hinders scientific progress, harms the planet, and threatens our lives. New York: Penguin Press.

=== Essays and reporting ===
- Specter, Michael (December 17, 2001). "India's plague". The New Yorker. Vol. 77, no. 40. pp. 74–86. Archived from the original on December 14, 2006.
- — (February 3, 2003). "The vaccine". The New Yorker. Vol. 78, no. 45. pp. 54–65. Archived from the original on December 12, 2006.
- — (November 15, 2010). "A deadly misdiagnosis". Letter from India. The New Yorker. Vol. 86, no. 36.
- — (February 4, 2013). "The operator : is the most trusted doctor in America doing more harm than good?". Profiles. The New Yorker. Vol. 88, no. 46. pp. 40–49.
- — (July 1, 2013). "The Lyme wars : the Lyme-disease infection rate is growing. So is the battle over how to treat it". Annals of Medicine. The New Yorker. Vol. 89, no. 19. pp. 24–29.
- — (January 6, 2014). "The gene factory : a Chinese firm's bid to crack hunger, illness, evolution – and the genetics of human intelligence". Letter from Shenzhen. The New Yorker. Vol. 89, no. 43. pp. 34–43.
- — (August 25, 2014). "Seeds of doubt : an activist's controversial crusade against genetically modified crops". Annals of Science. The New Yorker. Vol. 90, no. 24. pp. 46–57.
- — (October 20, 2014). "The fear equation". The Talk of the Town. Comment. The New Yorker. Vol. 90, no. 32. pp. 29–30.
- — (January 2, 2017). "Rewriting the code of life : through DNA editing, researchers hope to alter the genetic destiny of species and eliminate diseases". Annals of Science. The New Yorker. Vol. 92, no. 43. pp. 34–43.
- — (July 27, 2020). "Public nuisance : Larry Kramer, the man who warned America about AIDS, can't stop fighting hard – and loudly". Profiles. May 13, 2002. The New Yorker. Vol. 96, no. 21. pp. 40–49.

=== Audiobooks ===
- Specter, Michael (2020). Fauci. Pushkin Industries.
- Specter, Michael (2023). Higher Animals: Vaccines, Synthetic Biology, and the Future of Life. Pushkin Industries.
