= Revenge of the Tipping Point =

2024 book by Malcolm Gladwell

Revenge of the Tipping Point: Overstories, Superspreaders, and the Rise of Social Engineering
- Author: Malcolm Gladwell
- Language: English
- Genre: Non-fiction
- Publisher: Little, Brown and Company
- Publication date: Oct 1, 2024
- Publication place: United States
- Media type: print, audiobook, e-book
- Pages: 352
- ISBN: 978-0-316-57580-5
- OCLC: 1436904469
- Preceded by: The Bomber Mafia

Revenge of the Tipping Point: Overstories, Superspreaders, and the Rise of Social Engineering is a 2024 book by Canadian journalist Malcolm Gladwell that examines and revisits the ideas of his 2000 book The Tipping Point: How Little Things Can Make a Big Difference.

== Synopsis ==
The book includes Gladwell's analysis of cheetahs, Ivy League sports, Los Angeles in the 1990s, teen suicide, COVID-19, and the opioid crisis. The book is also largely focused on Gladwell's "rule of thirds" concept.

== Reception ==
The Associated Press described the book as fan service for readers who enjoyed The Tipping Point. In a review for The New York Times titled "Is Malcolm Gladwell Out of Ideas?", author Anand Giridharadas referred to the book as a "brand extension" and described it as unambitious and outdated, comparing it to junk food. According to a review in Financial Times, many of Gladwell's theories in the book do not "pass the smell test". According to a review in Slate, the book does not examine The Tipping Point as much as it "is devoted to expounding on Gladwell's earlier maxims." Irish Independent called it "easily readable" but "pedantic, repetitive and smug."
