= Death of Sandra Bland =

2015 death of a woman in Texas police custody

- Bland in a photo on social media
- Date: July 13, 2015
- Time: c. 9:00 a.m. (CDT)
- Location: Waller County Jail, Hempstead, Texas; 30.08516°N 95.98975°W (traffic stop) 30.10239°N 96.07535°W (Waller County Jail)
- Type: Death in custody
- Cause: Ruled a suicide by asphyxiation
- Outcome: Charge dropped against Brian Encinia as part of a plea agreement
- Deaths: Sandra Annette Bland
- Burial: Mount Glenwood Memory Gardens West; Willow Springs, Illinois, U.S.
- Inquiries: FBI investigation concluding wrongdoing by county jail
- Coroner: Harris County Medical Examiner
- Charges: Brian Encinia: Perjury (Note: For lying about the preceded traffic stop.) (dropped)
- Litigation: Wrongful death lawsuit by Bland's mother settled for $1.9 million

Sandra Annette Bland was a 28-year-old African-American woman who was found hanged in a jail cell in Waller County, Texas, on July 13, 2015, three days after being arrested during a traffic stop. Officials found her death to be a suicide. There were protests against her arrest, disputing the cause of death, and alleging racial violence against her.

Bland was pulled over for a traffic violation on July 10 by State Trooper Brian Encinia. The exchange escalated, resulting in Bland's arrest and a charge of assaulting a police officer. The arrest was partially recorded by Encinia's dashcam, a bystander's cell phone, and Bland's own cell phone. After authorities reviewed the dashcam footage, Encinia was placed on administrative leave for failing to follow proper traffic stop procedures.

Texas authorities and the FBI conducted an investigation into Bland's death and determined the Waller County jail did not follow required policies, including time checks on inmates and ensuring that employees had completed required mental health training.

In December 2015, a grand jury declined to indict the county sheriff and jail staff for a felony relating to Bland's death. The following month, Encinia was indicted for perjury for making false statements about the circumstances surrounding Bland's arrest, and he was subsequently fired by the Texas Department of Public Safety (DPS). In September 2016, Bland's mother settled a wrongful death lawsuit against the county jail and police department for $1.9 million and some procedural changes. In June 2017, the perjury charge against Encinia was dropped in return for his agreement to permanently end his law enforcement career.

In 2019, Bland's cell phone video became available to the public and to Bland's family for the first time. The video was obtained and shown by Dallas news station WFAA. This video was not available during the civil trials.

== Background ==
=== Sandra Bland ===
Sandra Annette Bland (February 7, 1987 – July 13, 2015) was from Naperville, Illinois, a suburb of Chicago, and was one of five sisters. Bland attended Willowbrook High School in Villa Park, Illinois and graduated in 2005. She then attended Prairie View A&M University outside Hempstead in Waller County, Texas, where she was a member of the Sigma Gamma Rho sorority before graduating in 2009 with a degree in agriculture. At Prairie View, she was recruited as a summer counselor for three years, played in the marching band, and volunteered for a senior citizens advocacy group.

Bland returned to Illinois in 2009. She worked in administration for Cook's Direct, a food-service equipment supplier, a job she left shortly before her death. She had been due to start a temporary job on August 3, 2015, with Prairie View as a summer program associate.

In January 2015, Bland began posting videos about many subjects, including police mistreatment of African Americans. In one video post from April of the same year, she wrote, "In the news that we've seen as of late, you could stand there, surrender to the cops, and still be killed." She has been described as a civil rights activist in Chicago, and a part of the Black Lives Matter movement. Bland had at least ten previous traffic-related encounters with police in Illinois and Texas beginning in June 2004, and had been charged five times for driving without insurance, four times for speeding, and once each for driving while intoxicated and drug possession. In May 2010 Bland was charged with marijuana possession in Houston. She pleaded guilty and was sentenced to 30 days in the Harris County jail in September 2010 according to court records. She owed $7,579 in unpaid fines at the time of her death. In her last legal case her license was suspended for six months after pleading guilty to DUI. Her license was restored in November 2014.

=== Brian Encinia ===
Brian Encinia was 30 years old at the time of the incident, and is listed in Texas voter records as Hispanic. He graduated from Texas A&M University in 2008 with a degree in agricultural leadership and development.

== Traffic stop ==
Encinia had a history of performing pretextual traffic stops, having issued 1,600 mostly minor tickets in less than 12 months, using the pretext of little-enforced minor infractions to then perform random searches in the hope of finding something criminal. He began following Bland in Prairie View, Texas on the afternoon of July 10, 2015, where he pulled her over on University Drive for failure to signal a lane change. In a series of events recorded by his dashcam, along with a bystander and Bland herself, Encinia spoke to Bland, and the interaction became heated; he told her to get out of the car, she refused, was threatened with a drawn Taser and the words "I will light you up", and exited the car. After they moved out of frame, he forced her on the ground, and arrested her.

=== Arrest footage ===
External videos
- Sandra Bland traffic stop (49:11) on YouTube – the second DPS upload, reportedly free of "irregularities" (Bland from 1:45)
- Sandra Bland's arrest (1:37) on YouTube – filmed by bystander
- Sandra Bland removed (0:39) on YouTube – filmed by Bland

In response to controversy over Bland's arrest and death, on July 21 the Texas Department of Public Safety (DPS) released dashcam footage of the arrest. Parts of the video appeared to be edited, with images of cars and people appearing or vanishing on the road, while the audio of Encinia's voice proceeded without interruption. A DPS spokesperson said that irregularities in the video resulted from technical issues that occurred when the video was posted. DPS then took down the problem video and replaced it with another version.

The footage shows that Encinia's tone and attitude change after he asks if Bland is irritated and she answers affirmatively. He initially wrote a routine traffic violation warning for Bland after she moved over but did not signal to let him pass since he was tailing her closely. After he returns to her car and speaks briefly to her again, he asks her to put out her cigarette. She responds, "Why do I have to put out a cigarette when I'm in my own car?" Encinia orders her to "get out of the car", and, when she repeatedly refuses to exit, he tells her she is under arrest. Bland repeatedly asks why she is under arrest, and Encinia responds, "I am giving you a lawful order." She refuses to leave her car, stating she is not under arrest as she is unaware of the reason and not obliged to. Encinia then opens her car door and tells her more than a dozen times to get out of the car before he tries to pull her out. After struggling, he draws his Taser and points it at Bland, shouting "I will light you up! Get out! Now!", at which point she exits her vehicle.

Once Bland is out of her car, the officer orders her to put down her cell phone and tells her she is going to jail. Bland continues to not follow the officer's orders. In the video, both Bland and the officer move to the passenger side of the vehicle and are no longer visible, while they continue to argue heatedly. Bland can be heard crying and screaming.

Bland's own 39-second video of part of the confrontation, which had been in possession of state investigators, was discovered in 2019 and aired by a Texas TV station. Bland's family and their lawyer in the civil lawsuit claim that the state had not given them this evidence. The Texas Department of Public Safety disagreed.

=== Eyewitness accounts ===
In a video recorded by a bystander, Bland is lying on the ground with Encinia and a female police officer above her. Bland says that she cannot hear, and states that the officer has slammed her head into the ground. She tells him that she is epileptic. This is confirmed by police dash-cam video footage, in which the officer responds "Good," after Bland informs him of her condition. In the video, Encinia orders the bystander to leave the area.

Sandra Bland also recorded the arrest on her own cell phone; that video became public in 2019, and was not part of the civil trial evidence.

=== Arrest ===
DPS stated that Bland was arrested because she kicked Encinia. She was charged with assaulting a public servant. DPS said that she "became argumentative and uncooperative" during the arrest. Officers took her to the Waller County Jail and placed her in a cell alone because they deemed her a high risk to others.

After her arrest, Bland told her sister that the arresting officer had pushed his knees into her back, and that she feared her arm was broken. A Houston television station states it obtained a voice message left by Bland after her arrest in which she asked, "How did switching lanes with no signal turn into all of this?"

== Incarceration and death ==
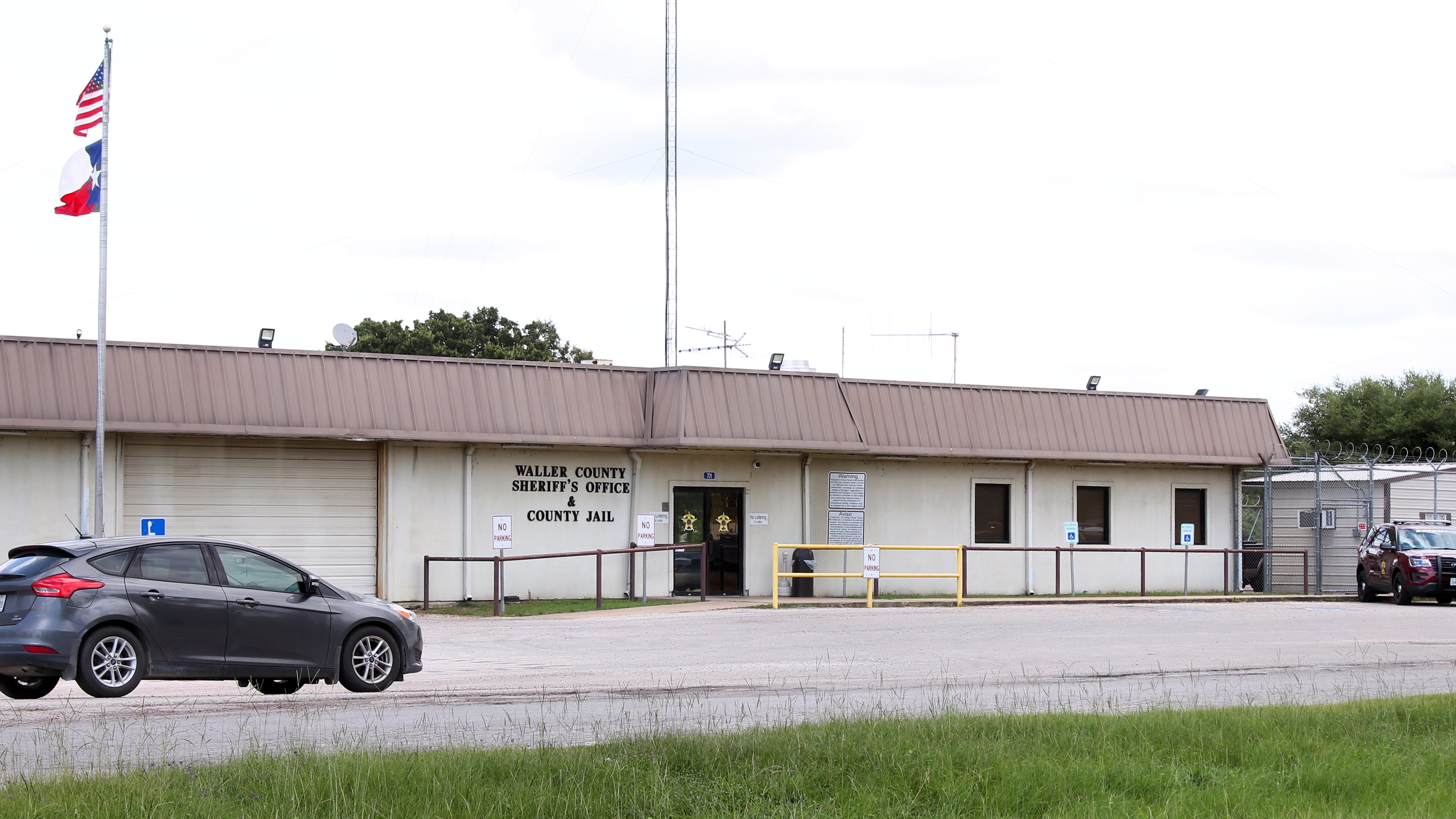
Waller County sheriff's office and jail

Bland's bail was set at $5,000. According to a statement from the jail officials, she had been given multiple opportunities to find someone who could post bond including a man she was staying with in Texas who "ignored her calls". Her bondsman also made several attempts to secure bail. Her family later stated they were attempting to secure the 10 percent ($500) needed to secure her release.

On July 28, authorities released several hours of video showing Bland at various times during her jail stay, including arriving at the jail, having her mug shot taken, and making phone calls (see § Waller County Jail videos). They said the footage was being released to dispel rumors and conspiracy theories, including that she was dead before she arrived at the jail and that her mug shot was taken after her death. At a news conference, Waller County Judge Trey Duhon said that such rumors have resulted in death threats against county officials: "Because of some of the things that's gone out on social media, this county has been literally attacked." Duhon said the FBI was investigating the most serious threats.

Alexandria Pyle, an inmate held in the adjacent cell, later told the media that Bland seemed "sort of distraught", was very emotional, and was crying frequently. Pyle, who spoke to Bland through a tiny chute, said Bland was upset that her friend had not come to bail her out. Pyle stated that she never heard any loud noise or commotion that would indicate foul play in Bland's death.

=== Discovery by jailer ===
Police stated that at 6:30 a.m. on July 13, Bland refused breakfast, and a half-hour later told a jailer "I'm fine." According to Captain Brian Cantrell, about an hour after stating that she was fine, Bland asked via intercom how to make a phone call. Cantrell stated that Bland was informed she could use the phone in her cell with a PIN, but stated there was no record Bland made any call. Police stated that at 9:00 a.m., Bland was found "in a semi-standing position" hanging in her cell.

The next day, shortly after noon, police issued a statement that Bland had been found dead in her cell, and that they believed she had hanged herself. On July 20, one week after Bland's death, authorities released video from a motion-activated camera in the hallway outside Bland's cell. The video shows no movement in and out of the cell from 7:34 to 9:07 a.m., her discovery by a female officer at that time, and resuscitation procedures being performed on Bland's body.

=== Harris County autopsy ===
An autopsy conducted by the Harris County Institute of Forensic Science concluded that Bland died through asphyxiation, and classified her death as a suicide. Police stated that Bland had used a plastic garbage bag to hang herself. The autopsy report showed Bland had multiple abrasions on the right side of her back, slight abrasions on her wrists, and 25 to 30 healing, parallel cuts on her left forearm that predated her arrest.

=== Toxicology ===
An initial toxicology report released by the Harris County medical examiner's office found "a remarkably high concentration" of THC for someone who had been in jail for three days, leading to speculation that Bland may have had access to marijuana while in jail. Waller County assistant district attorney, Warren Diepraam said that it was more likely that Bland had ingested a very large amount of marijuana prior to her arrest. A toxicologist for the Tarrant County medical examiner's office agreed, indicating a THC level as high as Bland's suggests she "either had access to the drug in jail or she was a consistent user of the drug and her body had accumulated THC to the point that it was slowly releasing it over time." But he added: "I have never seen a report in the literature or from any other source of residual THC that high three days after someone stops using the drug." Other experts disputed the significance of a single test result from a sample taken after death, explaining that marijuana science is not well-developed and that county officials may have been exaggerating the importance of Bland's THC blood level, which Columbia University researcher Carl Hart said was similar to the baseline blood level of a heavy marijuana user.

=== Funeral ===
Bland's funeral was held on July 22 at DuPage African Methodist Episcopal Church in Lisle, Illinois.

== Initial reactions ==
=== Calls for independent investigation ===
Family and friends called for an independent autopsy, and stated that it was unlikely Bland would have killed herself. Bland's family said that she was upbeat about the job she was about to begin for Texas A&M University at Prairie View.

In March, Bland posted a video to her Facebook page in which she said was suffering from "a little bit of depression as well as PTSD". Her sister said that Bland had no "medically diagnosed clinical depression", but had good and bad days. Cannon Lambert, the family's lawyer, stated that Bland's post in March gave little indication of her mindset around the time of her death.

A friend who spoke with Bland while she was in jail said she was upbeat despite the arrest: "It just makes no sense. Sandy was a soldier; she wasn't fazed about it."

=== Critical response and protests ===
In the two days after authorities announced her death, 31,000 people tweeted using the hashtag #SandraBland, and an online petition launched calling for an investigation of Bland's death. After three days, 200,000 people had tweeted her name.

On July 17, about 150 protesters gathered outside the Hempstead jail, chanting "No justice, no peace", and "We demand answers." Protesters outside the jail where Bland died held vigils and demanded an explanation for her death.

By July 29, 2015, at least twelve protests had been held for Bland around the country.

Protesters also asked why Bland had been stopped, and alleged racial profiling. Reverend Jamal Bryant of the Empowerment Temple AME Church in Baltimore traveled to Chicago at the Bland family's request, and called Bland's death "not a case of suicide, but homicide."

Texas State Senator Royce West called Bland's death suspicious. After meeting with law enforcement and other officials to discuss the circumstances surrounding Bland's death, he said that "the kind of information disclosed on Bland's intake form should have prompted jail officials to place Bland on a suicide watch, meaning a face-to-face check on her welfare every 15 minutes instead of the hourly checks normally required."

Bland's death resulted in protests, and calls for investigation by family, friends and others including Rep. Sheila Jackson Lee (D-TX).

Eric Zorn, writing for the Chicago Tribune, criticized Encinia for his handling of the traffic stop, calling him a "petty tyrant" and referring to his "Are you done?" as "snippy condescension familiar to anyone experienced in the bickering arts". However, he also said Bland was unnecessarily argumentative, writing: "[Y]ou must always defer meekly to the police. Even when they're acting like bullies, goading you or issuing you preposterous orders like to put out your cigarette as you sit in your own car, don't challenge their authority. ... Comply. And if you feel your rights are being violated, take it up later with a judge."

On August 13, about 25 heavily armed members of the New Black Panther Party rallied at a Texas jail to protest Bland's death and expressed their rage at police. No arrests were made.

In late August, the Prairie View City Council renamed part of University Drive as Sandra Bland Parkway.

Bland's mother, Geneva Reed-Veal, spoke about Bland at the 2016 Democratic National Convention.

On January 21, 2017, at the Women's March on Washington, singer and actress Janelle Monáe included Sandra Bland in her performance, evoking the audience to "Say [Bland's] name!" in addition to giving the Mothers of the Movement the microphone, including Bland's mother, to each say the name of their lost son or daughter.

== Official response and investigation ==
The FBI and DPS announced on July 16 that they had launched an investigation into Bland's death. Encinia was placed on administrative duties for violating procedures for traffic stops, and was terminated by DPS following his indictment on perjury charges. Waller County Sheriff R. Glenn Smith, who runs the jail in which Bland died, has been placed in charge of Waller County's investigation into her death. Smith was suspended and fired from his previous post as chief of police of Hempstead after alleged incidents of racism and brutality.

=== Policy violations at jail ===
According to CNN, a report from the Texas Commission on Jail Standards, published on July 16, found that Waller County jail "guards violated policies by failing to do timely checks on inmates," which should be hourly. The report also stated that jail employees had not been adequately trained to deal with mental health problems. The staff had not all undergone the minimum of two hours of mental health training required by the state.

On July 22, county officials produced intake forms that they say indicate Bland had earlier attempted suicide. One questionnaire states that Bland took pills in 2015 after having a miscarriage. Another form filed by a different jail employee says Bland attempted suicide earlier, in 2014. One form indicates Bland had contemplated suicide within the past year, while another says she did not.

After a white male prisoner hanged himself with a bedsheet in 2012, Texas state inspectors had also cited procedural failings by Waller County Jail's staff.

R. Glenn Smith, the Waller County sheriff, stated that the jail staff may face disciplinary actions for their failures of not putting Bland on a suicide watch, not personally checking on her, and leaving the plastic bag that was fashioned into a noose. He said the actions "could range from suspensions to transfers to terminations".

An inspection in 2018, several years after Bland's death, showed that the Waller County jail was again not monitoring inmates correctly. All inmates were supposed to be monitored face-to-face at least hourly, jail staff exceeded that by two and a half hours. Certain inmates, including those who are assaultive or potentially suicidal, should be monitored every half-hour. That limit was exceeded by 74 minutes.

== Further reactions ==
In August 2015, the Prairie View City Council voted to rename the street Sandra was arrested on to "Sandra Bland Parkway."

In March 2016, documents obtained from the forensic lab that performed Bland's autopsy suggested that the time of death was not that which was originally reported by official investigations and that this could raise questions about the validity of the original investigation.

A report by the Harris County forensic investigator contradicted the official report of the Waller County Sheriff's Department about details of the condition of the body. In addition, the documents stating the time guards last observed Bland alive in her cell did not agree with the security video footage from the jail where Bland was detained, leaving a discrepancy of an hour. Brandon Wood, director of the Texas Commission on Jail Standards, said that the failure to observe inmates hourly as required by standards "could be criminal in nature." An attorney for the Bland family said that it might be just a clerical error, or might be something "more nefarious."

Bland's mother Geneva Reed-Veal is a member of the Mothers of the Movement, bringing attention to police reform, Bland's story and the grief process of losing a child.

The events surrounding Bland's death form the basis for much of Malcolm Gladwell's sixth book Talking to Strangers (2019).

Sandra Bland's case returned to the public's attention in 2019 when her cell phone video became public for the first time. Her family's attorney said the case needed to be reopened in light of the new evidence.

== Legal proceedings ==
=== Investigation into death and charges against Encinia ===
In December 2015, a county grand jury declined to issue an indictment in connection to Bland's death. A special prosecutor said that "the case is still open", and that the grand jury would meet again in January 2016 to discuss other aspects. Those aspects were widely assumed to include Encinia's actions during the traffic stop, and Bland's family urged prosecutors to pursue criminal charges against him. Reconvening the following month, the grand jury indicted Encinia for perjury, a Class A misdemeanor with a possible penalty of one year in jail and a $4,000 fine. The charge resulted from his statement in an affidavit that his reason for removing Bland from her car was "to further conduct a safe traffic investigation". The grand jury found that statement to be false, according to a special prosecutor. Hours after the indictment was announced, DPS said they had begun the process to terminate Encinia's employment as a state trooper. After an arrest warrant was issued, Encinia surrendered at the Waller County Jail and was released after posting a $2,500 bond. His attorney said that he would appeal his termination, while Bland's family called for more serious criminal charges including battery and false arrest.

On June 28, 2017, a judge granted a motion by prosecutors to dismiss the perjury charge against Encinia. In return, Encinia agreed that he would "never seek, accept or engage in employment in any capacity with law enforcement" in Texas or elsewhere. He also agreed not to seek expungement of the perjury charge.

=== Wrongful death lawsuit ===
Bland's family filed a federal wrongful death lawsuit, and a jury trial in that case was scheduled for January 2017. The family sought unspecified damages from DPS, Encinia, Waller County, and two jailers. In September 2016, Bland's family settled the lawsuit for $1.9 million, according to her mother. Details remained to be worked out and the agreement still awaited court approval.

=== Sandra Bland Act ===
Texas Senate Bill 1849, also known as the Sandra Bland Act, went into effect on September 1, 2017, and mandated change to corrections and police policy when dealing with those with substance abuse or mental health concerns. S.B. 1849 "requires de-escalation training for police officers and mandates county jails divert people with mental health and substance abuse issues toward treatment, makes it easier for defendants to receive a personal bond if they have a mental illness or intellectual disability, and requires that independent law enforcement agencies investigate jail deaths".

Police officers are required to complete comprehensive racial profiling training and forty hours of de-escalation training. Law enforcement agencies will maintain records documenting race or ethnicity of all persons detained and whether the officer knew the individual's race or ethnicity prior to being detained. In addition, police officers will undergo training to limit uses of force. All law enforcement agencies are required to provide education to the public concerning complaint procedures.

County jails are required to collect information used to make a determination of mental illness or intellectual disability. A written assessment of collected information will be submitted to a magistrate and mental health expert if a potential substance abuse, mental illness or intellectual disability exists. If need arises and is reasonable, pending charges may be suspended and an individual may be diverted to a treatment facility. In the event of a death in custody, the custodial agency will begin an investigation until a representative of an outside agency is on scene. In addition, electronic monitoring will be in place to ensure timely security checks for the welfare of those incarcerated.

== Tributes ==
On September 8, 2015, at the Library of Congress, the just-inducted United States Poet Laureate Juan Felipe Herrera, the Chicago-Mexican son band Sones de Mexico, and their songwriting class, cowrote the ballad "Corrida de Sandra Bland", in Spanish. Sones de Mexico performed the song the next day.

In September of 2017, authors Stephen King and Owen King dedicated their collaborative novel, Sleeping Beauties in remembrance of Sandra Bland.

In 2018, filmmakers Kate Davis and David Heilbroner released the HBO documentary film Say Her Name: The Life and Death of Sandra Bland. Say Her Name is also the title of a painting by the artist Jennifer Packer created in response to Bland's death.

== See also ==
- Death in custody
- Pennsylvania v. Mimms
- Death of Ms Dhu – An Australian woman who died in police custody
