= The Bomber Mafia =

2021 book by Malcolm Gladwell

The Bomber Mafia: A Dream, a Temptation, and the Longest Night of the Second World War
- Hardcover edition
- Author: Malcolm Gladwell
- Language: English
- Subject: The Bomber Mafia
- Genre: Non-fiction
- Publisher: Little, Brown and Company
- Publication date: April 27, 2021
- Publication place: United States
- Media type: print, audiobook, e-book
- Pages: 256
- ISBN: 978-0-316-29661-8
- OCLC: 1232272458
- Preceded by: Talking to Strangers
- Followed by: Revenge of the Tipping Point

The Bomber Mafia: A Dream, a Temptation, and the Longest Night of the Second World War is a 2021 book by Canadian writer Malcolm Gladwell that examines the US Bomber Mafia of World War II, which advocated precision aerial bombing as a means to win a war. Gladwell stated the audiobook for The Bomber Mafia came about as an expansion of material from his podcast Revisionist History, and that the print book originated from the audiobook. The book follows the Bomber Mafia, especially Major General Haywood S. Hansell, and the development of a high-altitude precision aerial bombardment strategy in World War II as a means to limit casualties. After difficulties in applying the Bomber Mafia's theoretical strategy, Major General Hansell was replaced by Major General Curtis LeMay, who utilized tactical changes such as attacking Japanese population centers with napalm to ensure a Japanese surrender. Upon release, The Bomber Mafia was met with mixed reviews, with reviewers praising its audiobook version but criticizing the book for a lack of detail and factual accuracy.

== Author ==
The author of the book is Malcolm Gladwell, an English-born Canadian journalist, author, and public speaker. In 2016, Gladwell started Revisionist History, a history-focused podcast that "re-examines something from the past – an event, a person, an idea, even a song – and asks whether we got it right the first time". He devoted four episodes of the fifth season of Revisionist History to air power in World War II, and stated the audiobook served as an expansion of material from the podcast. The Bomber Mafia began as an audiobook, and later transitioned into a print book.

== Content ==
The book follows the story of the Bomber Mafia, a group of American military officers, especially Major General Haywood S. Hansell, as they developed a wartime doctrine of daylight strategic bombing as a means to defeat an enemy with precision high-altitude aerial bombardment. This could lead to a minimum of war-time casualties with new technology such as the Norden bombsight. In that regard, this was at odds with the Royal Air Force's doctrine of area bombing under the direction of Marshal of the Royal Air Force Sir Arthur Harris.

When the United States entered World War II, the Bomber Mafia's doctrine proved of little military use and costly in implementation with the realities of current technology under real-world combat conditions. This especially applied with Allied air raids on Japan where previously unaccounted atmospheric conditions such as the jet stream seriously interfered with operations under Hansell's command. The book examines Hansell's replacement by Major General Curtis LeMay, who implemented a series of tactical changes such as ordering bombing at a dramatically lower altitude to avoid the jet stream, removal of most of the bombers' defensive weaponry to increase bomb payload and wholesale nighttime fire bombing with incendiaries like napalm to devastate many of the population centers of Japan. The result furthered the Allies' military objectives leading to Japan's surrender, such as with the bombing of Tokyo on March 10, 1945.

After the Gulf War, David L. Goldfein states that by then bombs could hit, with precision, a specific wing of a building. At the time the book was released, a modern B-2 Stealth Bomber could approach a target without being detected on radar from 40,000 feet in altitude. The book concludes that "LeMay won the battle. [...] Hansell won the war".

== Reception ==
The book was met with mixed reviews upon release. In The Wall Street Journal, Yale professor Paul Kennedy praised the audiobook version of The Bomber Mafia as "remarkable" and a "work of art"; similarly, in The Times, reviewer Gerard DeGroot said "The Bomber Mafia remind[ed] [him] of a really good podcast – a fascinating story is appealingly delivered", and historian Diana Preston of The Washington Post called the audiobook "innovative" for its inclusion of archival clips, music, and sound effects. James McConnachie of The Times stated "for a book that is not a war story, this one is brilliantly, brilliantly told". In The New York Times Book Review, Thomas E. Ricks called the book "a conversational work" which he enjoyed, but noted that "when Gladwell leaps to provide superlative assessments, or draws broad lessons of history from isolated incidents, he makes me wary". Writing for the Los Angeles Review of Books, professors David Fedman and Cary Karacas state "[a]s a piece of writing, The Bomber Mafia is engaging. As a work of history, it borders on reckless".

Several reviewers criticized the book for its accuracy, and for being light on details. Kennedy stated there were "gaps in [Gladwell's] account", and cites the RAF Bomber Command's attempt at careful bombing as an example. In The Daily Telegraph, military historian Saul David called the book "error prone" and "bedevilled by the same oversimplification of the world into a single Big Idea that is characteristic of his other work", and gave the book two out of five stars. DeGroot said "the subject demands more depth than this volume provides", and stated Gladwell boiled down the bombing strategy's evolution to personality clashes between Hansell and LeMay while ignoring other major factors, such as how the morality and acceptance of bombing evolved. Publishers Weekly stated "this history feels more tossed off than fully fledged", though Gladwell "provide[d] plenty of colorful details and pose[d] intriguing questions about the morality of warfare". Professors Fedman and Karacas stated that errors "pile up to the point where it becomes clear that a book that has received so much attention ought to have received more fact-checking".

Writing for The Baffler, Noah Kulwin criticized the book as "an attempt to retcon the history of American aerial warfare by arguing that developing the capacity to explode anything, anywhere in the world has made America and, indeed, the rest of the globe, unequivocally safer" and stated "by taking up military history, Gladwell's half-witted didacticism threatens to convince millions of people that the only solution to American butchery is to continue shelling out for sharper and larger knives." Fedman and Karacas state "[w]ittingly or not, [Gladwell] omits or downplays evidence that undermines the very premise of the book. Hansell was not the moral opposite of LeMay. To frame the book in this simplistic binary is to misconstrue the doctrines of both precision and area bombing".

A reviewer in Kirkus Reviews stated Gladwell "[delivered] a fairly flattering portrait of LeMay". Ricks calls LeMay an "unexpected hero" of the story, while McConnachie cites Hansell as Gladwell's hero. The book debuted and peaked at number two on The New York Times Best Seller list for hardcover nonfiction on May 16, 2021.
