= What the Dog Saw =

2009 book by Malcolm Gladwell

What the Dog Saw: And Other Adventures
- Paperback edition
- Author: Malcolm Gladwell
- Language: English
- Genre: Non-fiction
- Publisher: Little, Brown and Company
- Publication date: October 20, 2009
- Publication place: United States
- Media type: Hardback, e-book, audiobook
- Pages: 432 pp.
- ISBN: 978-0316075848
- Preceded by: Outliers (2008)
- Followed by: David and Goliath (2013)

What the Dog Saw: And Other Adventures is the fourth book released by Canadian author Malcolm Gladwell, on October 20, 2009. The book is a compilation of the journalist's articles published in The New Yorker.

== Background ==
Gladwell initially covered business and science in The Washington Post before joining the staff at The New Yorker in 1997. Each of the articles first appeared in The New Yorker and was handpicked by Gladwell. The stories share a common theme, namely that Gladwell tries to show us the world through the eyes of others, even if that other happens to be a dog, hence the title.

== Synopsis ==
What the Dog Saw is a compilation of 19 articles by Malcolm Gladwell that were originally published in The New Yorker which are categorized into three parts. The first part, Obsessives, Pioneers, and Other Varieties of Minor Genius, describes people who are very good at what they do, but are not necessarily well-known. Part two, Theories, Predictions, and Diagnoses, describes the problems of prediction. This section covers problems such as intelligence failure, and the fall of Enron. The third section, Personality, Character, and Intelligence, discusses a wide variety of psychological and sociological topics ranging from the difference between early and late bloomers to criminal profiling.

== Reception ==
What the Dog Saw was met with mainly positive reviews. It received profiles in many high-profile publications, including The New York Times, The Guardian, Time, the Los Angeles Times and The Independent. In particular, Gladwell was praised for his writing and storytelling, and reviewers looked upon the essay format positively, with The Guardian stating "one virtue of What the Dog Saw is that the pieces are perfectly crafted: they achieve their purpose more effectively when they aren't stretched out." However, What The Dog Saw was criticized for its use of statistics and its lack of technical grounding.

What the Dog Saw debuted at #3 on The New York Times Bestseller List. It spent three weeks in the top 3 and a total of 16 weeks on the chart, appearing concurrently with Gladwell's previous book Outliers. It was also an Amazon Top 25 seller for the month of November. What the Dog Saw was named to Bloomberg's top 50 business books of 2009.
