= Pushkin Industries =

American publisher of podcasts and audiobooks

Pushkin Industries is an American publisher of podcasts and audiobooks. It was started in 2018 by Canadian Malcolm Gladwell and American Jacob Weisberg. As of 2021, it hosts over 25 podcasts.

== History ==
The company was co-founded in 2018 by Malcolm Gladwell and Jacob Weisberg, based on an idea by Weisberg. The two worked together on Gladwell's podcast Revisionist History at Panoply Media and after Panoply exited the medium, the two wanted to do more projects together and started Pushkin.

In 2019, Tim Harford launched his podcast Cautionary Tales on the network. That same year, Pushkin began producing audiobooks, beginning with Gladwell's Talking to Strangers: What We Should Know about the People We Don't Know.

Among other books, it published Miracle and Wonder: Conversations with Paul Simon, co-written by Gladwell and based on interviews with the musician Paul Simon. Gladwell's The Bomber Mafia was written and conceived of as an audio production with sound effects and music. Only after the script was complete was a book produced.

Pushkin Industries won "Podcast Network of the Year" at the 2021 Adweek Podcast Awards.

In July 2022, Pushkin Industries agreed to buy the podcast studio Transmitter Media, marking the company's first acquisition.

In September 2023, Pushkin laid off 17 employees, comprising more than 30% of its staff. As part of the reorganization, former Transmitter owner Gretta Cohn became CEO, while Weisberg took the title of executive chair. The change came amid significant layoffs in the podcast industry, including at Spotify and Sony. In November 2023, the company's producers and staff voted to unionize and joined Writers Guild of America, East.

As of 2024, the company's most popular podcasts include Gladwell's Revisionist History; Harford's Cautionary Tales; The Happiness Lab, hosted by Laurie R. Santos; and Against the Rules with Michael Lewis, where Lewis covered the Sam Bankman-Fried trial.
