= Class size =

Number of students in a class

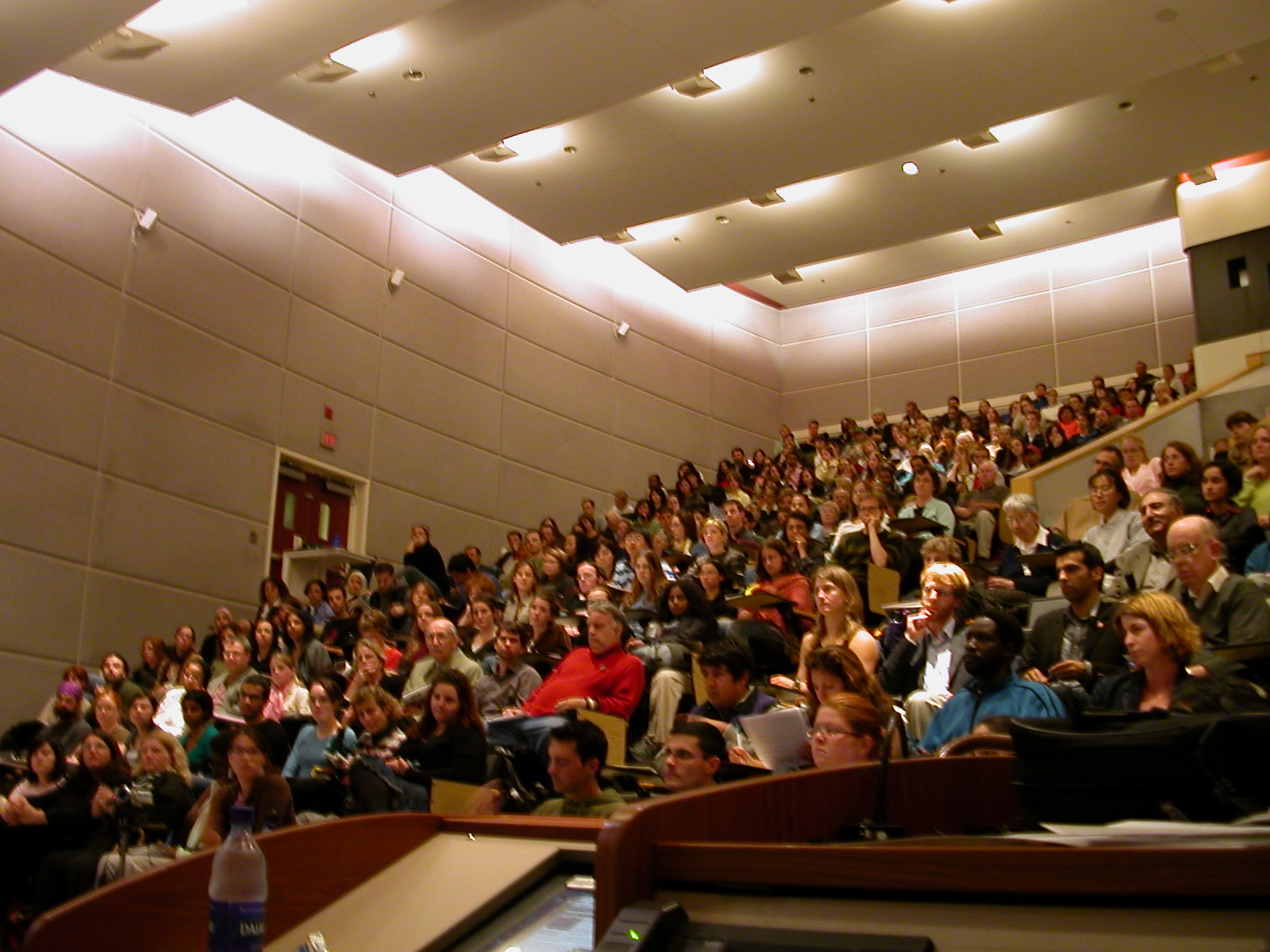
A large class at the University of Ottawa

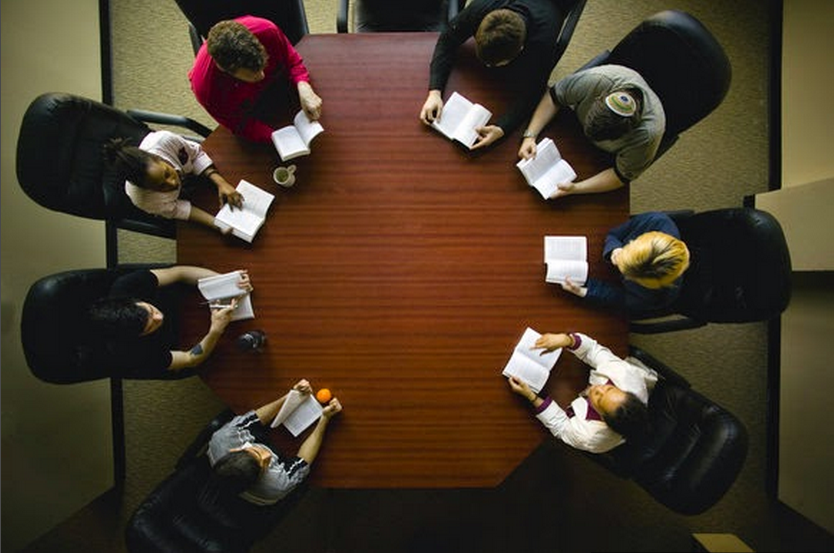
A small class at Shimer College

Class size refers to the number of students a teacher faces during a given period of instruction.

== Measurements and definitions ==
Some researchers and policymakers have studied the effects of class size by using student-teacher ratio (or its inverse, teacher-student ratio), but class size is not accurately captured by this metric. As Michael Boozer and Cecilia Rouse explain in "Intraschool Variation in Class Size: Patterns and Implications", student-teacher ratio gives an imprecise view of class size because teachers may be unevenly distributed across classrooms. Some teachers have light course loads as they are assigned to spend most or all of their time coaching other teachers. These coaches would nevertheless factor into the calculation of student-teacher ratio. In other classes – say, an inclusion class with special education students – two teachers may jointly teach a class of thirty-four students. Although student-teacher ratio would describe this class' size as seventeen, these teachers continue to face thirty-four students during instruction. In general, average class size will be larger than student-teacher ratio anytime a school assigns more than one teacher to some classrooms. In poor and urban districts, where schools enroll higher numbers of students needing specialized instruction, student-teacher ratios will therefore be especially imprecise measures of class size.

Although student-teacher ratio does not measure class size, some important studies and surveys have used student-teacher ratio as a proxy for class size. Indeed, some critics of class size reduction, including Malcolm Gladwell's David and Goliath, cite a 1986 study by Eric Hanushek, "The Economics of Schooling: Production and Efficiency in Public Schools", that relies on a literature review of data on student-teacher ratio instead of class size. See Class-size reduction for a full discussion of Hanushek's thesis.

== Class size through history ==
Educators have noted the benefits of class size since classical times.

Isocrates opened an academy of rhetoric in Athens around 392 B.C.E to train Athenian generals and statesmen, and he insisted on enrolling no more than six or eight students in his school at a time. Edward J. Power explains that Isocrates admitted "only a few students to his classes because of his extraordinary concern for care." Quintilian, a rhetorician writing in the Roman Empire around 100 CE, cited the practices in Isocrates' school as evidence that a caring education required small class sizes. Quintilian argued in Institutes of Oratory, as Edward Power summarizes the book's thesis, that "care had nothing whatever to do with discipline: it meant simply that only a few students at a time could be taught effectively."

The twelfth century rabbinic scholar Maimonides recognized that class size was correlated with student achievement. He wrote: "Twenty-five children may be put in charge of one teacher. If the number in the class exceeds twenty- five but is not more than forty, he should have an assistant to help with the instruction. If there are more than forty, two teachers must be appointed.''

Erasmus, the Dutch Humanist, wrote in his 1529 study of education De Pueris Instituendis about the advantages of private tutoring over ecclesiastic and public schools, where he believed classes had grown too large. He explained that "his standard of efficiency demanded a small school conducted by brilliant scholars…" Erasmus recognized that most parents would nevertheless have to settle for large class sizes because of the financial costs of such tutoring.

At the turn of the 20th century, the philosopher and educational theorist John Dewey explained that in his ideal school, class sizes should be very small. "For the purposes of convenience, the children are divided into small groups of eight to twelve according to the kind of work and the age of the children. It is expected that the teacher will give attention to the specific powers and deficiencies of each child, so that the individual capacities will be brought out, and individual limitations made good."

Around World War I, classes of 50 or more students were common in New York City, but dropping since that time. In 1930, the average class size in elementary schools was around 38 students, with classes for handicapped students averaging about 25 while other classes in the same building might be well over 45. This is set in contrast to some teachers in the 1890s facing 75 students daily. By the 1930s there was a public commitment to provide better individual attention to each student. Harold Campbell, the superintendent of New York city Board of Education at that time, opined that the ideal size of classes for normal students should be about 30 students.

The author Kurt Vonnegut was a passionate advocate for class size reduction: "… we have some of the worst schools in the world…. The classes are too big. My definition of a utopia is very simple: classes of 15 or smaller – out of this, a great nation can be built. Classes have 35 students, for Christ's sake. The class ideally should be a family. Let's take care of each other. There's a person who can't get the hang of calculus? Someone should say, "Here, let me show you." A class of 35? Poor teacher." Likewise, in a 2006 interview with NPR before his death in 2007, Vonnegut was asked: "If you were to build or envision a country that you could consider yourself to be a proud citizen of, what would be three of its basic attributes"? Vonnegut responded: "Just one: great public schools with classes of 12 or smaller." Interviewer: "That's it?" Vonnegut: "Yeah….Just do this."

Frank McCourt, a teacher in New York City public schools for thirty years and a Pulitzer Prize winner, also stressed the importance of smaller class size. In response to a radio interview question about what he would do first if he were named Schools Chancellor, McCourt answer that he would "cut the school day and certainly cut the size of the class because they're monstrous."

== Class size regulation ==
36 states in the USA have adopted provisions to require class size reduction. These laws may set caps on individual class sizes, on school-wide student-teacher ratio, or class size averages in one or more grades. Several states have relaxed those requirements since 2008. Florida's class size cap was established over the course of several years, in response to a statewide referendum in 2002 that amended its state constitution. Statewide, class size averages are 15.46 students per class in grades preK-3, 17.75 in grades 4–8, and 19.01 in high school. Some cities regulate class size as well. San Diego, New York, and Boston include class size caps in their contracts with teachers unions.

== Average values ==
=== Worldwide ===
In a 2013 survey, OECD reports the average class size of its member countries at 24.1 The complete results of this study are below. Note that class size averages in this study are based on reports from lower secondary school (middle school) teachers about a class they choose at random to describe. The study did not comprehensively survey school enrollment, which is why the United States' class size average appears differently here than in the previous chart.

Country	Average Class Size
Flanders (Belgium)	17.3
Estonia	17.3
Latvia	17.7
Finland	17.8
Slovak Republic	19.1
Iceland	19.6
Croatia	20.0
Cyprus	20.7
Czech Republic	21.1
Denmark	21.2
Poland	21.4
Sweden	21.4
Bulgaria	21.7
Italy	21.8
Serbia	21.9
Norway	22.5
Portugal	22.6
Spain	23.6
England (United Kingdom)	23.9
Average	24.1
Australia	24.7
Abu Dhabi (United Arab Emirates)	25.1
Netherlands	25.4
France	25.5
Canada	25.8
United States	27.0
Israel	27.6
Brazil	30.8
Japan	31.2
Chile	31.8
Malaysia	32.1
Korea	32.4
Mexico	33.0
Singapore	35.5
China	38

=== In the United States ===
==== Historical data on United States class size average ====
National class size estimates date back only to the late 1980s. Available historical data appears in the table below.

Year	Elementary Class Size Average	Secondary Class Size Average
2020-2021	19.1	17.2
2007-2008	20	23.4
2003-2004	20.4	24.7
1999-2000	21.1	23.6
1993-1994	24.1	23.6

==== US elementary averages by state ====
Based on most recent data available from the National Center for Education Statistics.

Place	Average Elementary Class Size
United States	19.1
Alabama	17.5
Alaska	16.6
Arizona	20.4
Arkansas	18.8
California	23.0
Colorado	18.8
Connecticut	18.0
Delaware	17.9
District of Columbia	15.8
Florida	17.9
Georgia	20.3
Hawaii	17.5
Idaho	21.2
Illinois	18.7
Indiana	21.3
Iowa	19.8
Kansas	17.9
Kentucky	19.8
Louisiana	18.3
Maine	14.2
Maryland	18.3
Massachusetts	16.7
Michigan	21.5
Minnesota	20.9
Mississippi	18.9
Missouri	18.2
Montana	18.1
Nebraska	18.9
Nevada	18.5
New Hampshire	16.0
New Jersey	16.9
New Mexico	17.6
New York	16.9
North Carolina	18.5
North Dakota	16.8
Ohio	19.2
Oklahoma	19.7
Oregon	21.0
Pennsylvania	18.4
Rhode Island	19.5
South Carolina	17.9
South Dakota	19.0
Tennessee	18.6
Texas	17.7
Utah	22.0
Vermont	14.9
Virginia	17.8
Washington	19.0
West Virginia	16.4
Wisconsin	18.2
Wyoming	16.1

==== US secondary school averages by state ====
Based on most recent data available from the National Center for Education Statistics.

Place	Average Secondary School Class Size
United States	21.0
Alabama	20.1
Alaska	15.4
Arizona	22.6
Arkansas	17.2
California	27.1
Colorado	22.4
Connecticut	18.6
Delaware	21.6
District of Columbia	19.1
Florida	23.4
Georgia	22.4
Hawaii	20.1
Idaho	20.5
Illinois	21.1
Indiana	19.6
Iowa	19.5
Kansas	17.4
Kentucky	20.0
Louisiana	20.9
Maine	13.4
Maryland	22.0
Massachusetts	17.4
Michigan	23.4
Minnesota	23.6
Mississippi	17.9
Missouri	19.2
Montana	16.2
Nebraska	16.8
Nevada	27.6
New Hampshire	16.8
New Jersey	19.1
New Mexico	20.1
New York	19.6
North Carolina	20.4
North Dakota	15.8
Ohio	18.6
Oklahoma	16.7
Oregon	22.6
Pennsylvania	19.4
Rhode Island	20.5
South Carolina	20.1
South Dakota	19.7
Tennessee	19.9
Texas	20.1
Utah	22.1
Vermont	15.4
Virginia	20.9
Washington	22.2
West Virginia	17.7
Wisconsin	22.2
Wyoming	16.1

== See also ==
- Maimonides' rule
- Small learning communities
- Small schools movement
