= Vase with White and Red Carnations =

Painting by Vincent van Gogh

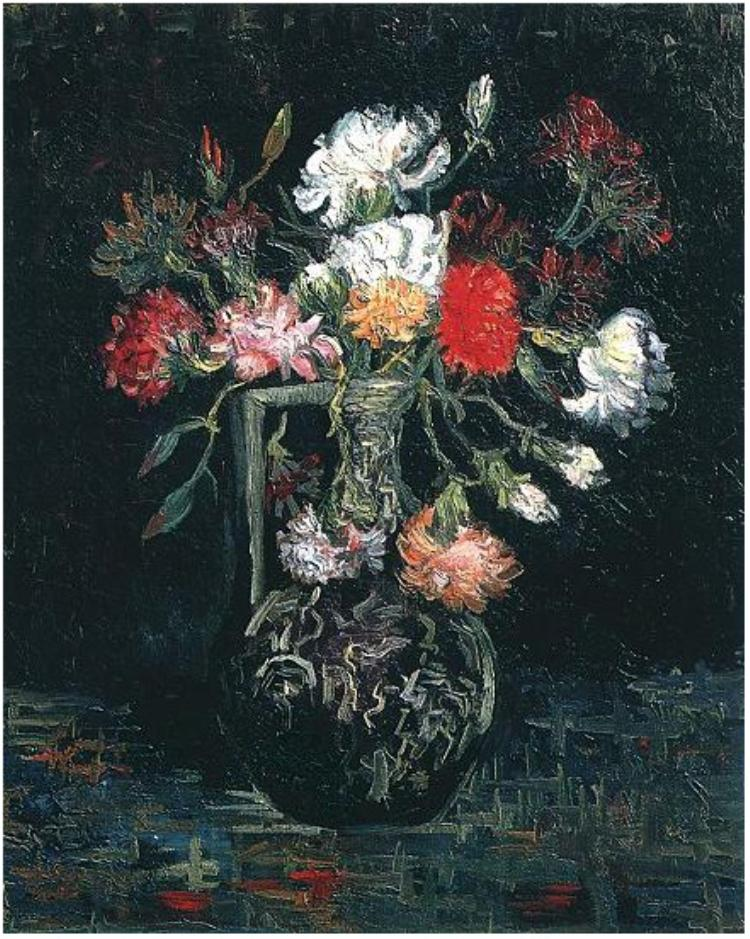
- Vase with White and Red Carnations
- Artist: Vincent van Gogh
- Year: 1886
- Catalogue: F236; JH1130
- Medium: Oil on canvas
- Dimensions: 58.0 cm × 45.5 cm (22.8 in × 17.9 in)
- Owner: Private collection

Vase with White and Red Carnations is a work by Vincent van Gogh. It is an oil on canvas painting in a private collection, painted in the summer of 1886 in Paris. The painting depicts white and red carnation flowers in a gold and dark brown vase.

Provenance:

Owner	Auction House/Exhibit Name	Year	Type
Sessler, US	Parke-Bernet	26 October 1944	Museum
A. Ball Art Gallery, US	Parke-Bernet	9 November 1955	Museum
	Christie's	2 November 1993	Private collection

== See also ==
- List of works by Vincent van Gogh

== Bibliography ==
- Van Gogh, V and Leeuw, R (1997) [1996]. van Crimpen, H, Berends-Albert, M. ed. The Letters of Vincent van Gogh. London and other locations: Penguin Books.
- Wallace, R. (1969). The World of Van Gogh (1853–1890). Alexandria, Virginia, US: Time-Life Books.
