= David and Goliath (book) =

2013 book by Malcolm Gladwell

- First edition cover
- Author: Malcolm Gladwell
- Language: English
- Subject: Psychology, sociology
- Genre: Non-fiction
- Publisher: Little, Brown and Company
- Publication date: October 1, 2013
- Publication place: United States
- Media type: Hardback, audiobook
- Pages: 320
- ISBN: 978-0-316-20436-1
- OCLC: 866564460
- LC Class: 2008661714
- Preceded by: What the Dog Saw, 2009
- Followed by: Talking to Strangers, 2019

David and Goliath: Underdogs, Misfits, and the Art of Battling Giants is a non-fiction book written by Canadian writer Malcolm Gladwell and published by Little, Brown and Company on October 1, 2013. The book focuses on the probability of improbable events occurring in situations where one outcome is greatly favored over the other. The book contains many different stories of these underdogs who wind up beating the odds, the most famous being the story of David and Goliath. Despite generally negative reviews, the book was a bestseller, rising to #4 on The New York Times Hardcover Non-fiction chart, and #5 on USA Today's Best-Selling Books.

== Origin ==
The book is partially inspired by an article Gladwell wrote for The New Yorker in 2009 entitled "How David Beats Goliath".

== Summary ==
David and Goliath employs individual case studies and comparison to provide a wide range of examples where perceived major disadvantages in fact turn out to be the keys to the underdog Davids' triumph against Goliath-like opponents or situations. In one arc, Gladwell cites various seeming afflictions that may in fact have significantly contributed to success, linking dyslexia with the high-flying career of lawyer David Boies, and the loss of a parent at an early age with the exceptional research work of oncologist Emil "Jay" Freireich. These anecdotal lessons are anchored by references to research in the social sciences.

Other examples include: Vivek Ranadive, and a middle school girls' basketball team in Redwood City; Teresa DeBrito, and the impact of class size regulations; Caroline Sacks, and choosing between going to a top-tier college or a second-tier college; David Boies and how he still has a great career despite having or perhaps because of his dyslexia or a desirable difficulty; Jay Freireich and his cancer research, London bombings in World War II, and the effect of "remote misses" on the city's morale and a person's courage; activist Wyatt Walker and how he and Martin Luther King Jr. were able to make the Birmingham riot of 1963 a historically significant event in the civil rights movement using Br'er Rabbit-like tactics; Rosemary Lawlor and how the Northern Irish police's reaction to religious riots in Belfast in 1969 led to a 30-year conflict called The Troubles, and contrasting this to how a police officer in New York City created a program that connected with troubled youths and their families; how Mike Reynolds' reaction to a family member being murdered led to the California Three-strikes law and how Wilma Derksen's reaction led to a completely different result; and André Trocmé, a pastor in a small town in the French mountains Le Chambon-sur-Lignon that stood up to the Nazi regime and harbored Jewish refugees.

== Critical reception ==
Critical response to David and Goliath was largely negative. The book was unfavorably reviewed twice in The New York Times. Janet Maslin quipped, "As usual, Mr. Gladwell's science is convenient", and she concludes that "the book's middle section is its messiest", where the author attempts to link the experiences of famous dyslexics such as Brian Grazer and David Boies. Joe Nocera called the book "deeply repetitive and a bewildering sprawl," suggesting that "[m]aybe what 'David and Goliath' really illustrates is that it's time for Malcolm Gladwell to find a new shtick."

Writing in Esquire, Tom Junod echoed Nocera's conclusion; his review bore the title "Malcolm Gladwell Runs Out of Tricks". Junod coined a term called "The Gladwell Feint", whereby the author questions the obvious, and asserting that the reader's preconceptions are wrong, before reassuring the reader that he has subconsciously known this all along. The Feint is an algorithm that produces reliably feel-good stories. "Gladwell might be suspect as a philosopher, but his credentials as the Horatio Alger of late-period capitalism are unsurpassed." The New Republic reinforced this critique, calling the book less insightful than a Chinese fortune cookie and topping the review with the headline "Malcolm Gladwell Is America's Best-Paid Fairy-Tale Writer". The Wall Street Journal lamented, "This is an entertaining book. But it teaches little of general import, for the morals of the stories it tells lack solid foundations in evidence and logic."

"To read David and Goliath is to suffer the discomfort of watching a formidably intelligent author flailing—by citing all manner of social-scientific studies and battering us with charts and tables and graphs—to prove something that no one would disagree with in the first place", wrote Craig Seligman for Bloomberg News. "The further I read into David and Goliath, the more irritated I got. I wasn't persuaded there was much of a subject there, but what really bugged me was the tone." Seligman concluded, "[I]n the past I've always felt flattered by Gladwell's writing. I like having things explained to me. But I don't like being talked down to by someone who's telling me things I already know."

However, Lucy Kellaway in the Financial Times wrote, "David and Goliath is Gladwell's most enjoyable book so far. It is a feel-good extravaganza, nourishing both heart and mind… Gladwell is a master at marching us off in one direction, only to end up taking us somewhere else instead—somewhere better."

== See also ==
- Legitimacy (political)
