= Talking to Strangers =

2019 book by Malcolm Gladwell

Talking to Strangers: What We Should Know about the People We Don't Know
- Paperback edition
- Author: Malcolm Gladwell
- Language: English
- Subject: Psychology, sociology, popular culture
- Genre: Non-fiction
- Publisher: Little Brown
- Publication date: 2019
- Publication place: United States
- Media type: Print (paperback, hardcover), Audiobook (Audible), Ebook (Kindle)
- Pages: 400
- ISBN: 0316478520; ISBN 978-0316478526 (first hardcover edition)
- Preceded by: David and Goliath, 2013
- Followed by: The Bomber Mafia, 2021

Talking to Strangers: What We Should Know about the People We Don't Know is a nonfiction book written by Canadian writer Malcolm Gladwell and published by Little, Brown and Company (hardcover version) on September 10, 2019. The audiobook version of the book follows Gladwell's Revisionist History podcast-style structure, using Gladwell's narration, interviews, sound bites, and the theme song "Hell You Talmbout".

== Summary ==
Talking to Strangers studies miscommunication, interactions and assumptions people make when dealing with those that they don't know. To make his point, Gladwell covers a variety of events and issues, including the arrest and subsequent death of Sandra Bland; British Prime Minister Neville Chamberlain's interactions with Adolf Hitler; the sex abuse scandal of Larry Nassar; the Cuban mole Ana Montes; the investment scandal of Bernie Madoff; the Jerry Sandusky child sex abuse scandal; the trial of Amanda Knox; the Brock Turner rape case; Sylvia Plath's death; and the Kansas City preventive patrol experiment. The book opens and closes with an analysis of the Sandra Bland case.

The book draws from the truth-default theory by psychologist and communication studies professor Timothy R. Levine. "Default to truth" is used throughout the book to observe how human beings are by nature trusting, not only of people or technology, but of everything. Sometimes this kind of behavior, the lack of understanding each other, leads to disastrous and tragic outcomes, as elaborated by Gladwell in the stories he brings. Gladwell notes how there are evolutionary social reasons why we trust more than suspect - the need for cooperation being one. Gladwell asserts that defaulting to distrust would be disastrous and that we should "accept the limits of our ability to decipher strangers".

The audiobook version of the book features voices of people Gladwell interviewed, such as scientists and military psychologists. Court transcripts are re-enacted. The book uses the theme song "Hell You Talmbout" by Janelle Monáe.

== Critical reception ==
Reviews by Carol Tavris in The Wall Street Journal and Anthony Gottlieb in The New York Times say that "the book is not really about strangers" and the "title doesn't describe the book". Gottlieb notes how Bernie Madoff, Jerry Sandusky, Ana Montes, and others deceived not only strangers, but also those familiar and close to them. Tavris notes how the stories in the book are related to people we talk "about" rather than those we talk "to" in our daily lives. Tavris asserts that the strangers in the book, like Hitler and Bernie Madoff, are not strangers at all, but people who may have been in the news, or someone we knew or admired, before learning more about them changed our entire perception. Andrew Ferguson writes in The Atlantic that Gladwell does not define the word "stranger" in the book, and the definition varies according to the story being told.

Gladwell is criticized by more than one reviewer about the quality of his research for the book. Tavris calls him a "somewhat lazy researcher". Ferguson in The Atlantic points out that Gladwell referenced "poets die young" in the Sylvia Plath anecdote, using a study which had a sample of just 36 "major poets" consisting of "British and Irish poets born between 1705 and 1805". Out of these 36, two committed suicide, and this is the basis for the following line in Gladwell's book that Ferguson criticizes: "And of every occupational category, [poets] have far and away the highest suicide rates—as much as five times higher than the general population". Ferguson also questions the reasoning behind how someone would categorize a "poet" into an "occupational category", adding that "at times he (Gladwell) approaches self-parody". Tavris also criticizes a footnote that she says is "flat-out wrong", writing, "The idea that traumatic memories are repressed and can be retrieved only under the direction of therapy is—to say the least—controversial". Tavris notes how an underlying theme throughout the book, truth-default theory by psychologist Timothy R. Levine, is used very superficially and without any discussion of the conditions under which "we default to truth, and when don't we?"

Tavris asserts that Gladwell's whole point is that we label people too quickly, even without knowing the whole picture; we think that we would be able to recognize evil when it stared us in the face, and how wrong we are in this assumption. Gottlieb writes in The New York Times that "a little more substance would have been nice", while Ben East writes in The National that the book has "no defining, take-home idea".

Some critics were moderate in their reception, expressing doubt in Gladwell's ideas but praising other aspects of the book.The Times of India expresses doubt in Gladwell's interpretation of Bland's death, but says that Gladwell's "writing is as immersive as ever and his storytelling skills are commendable", and that the book is even for those who like the social sciences or fiction. Brian Naylor of NPR expresses doubt in Gladwell's theories around the sexual assault of Chanel Miller and Bland's case, suggesting that while he is oversimplifying some situations, Gladwell's ideas around perception of strangers still contain good advice. Andrew Anthony of The Guardian is doubtful of the relationship between the various circumstances Gladwell draws comparisons between, still suggesting the book is "fascinating study of gullibility and the social necessity of trusting strangers".
