= The Tipping Point =

2000 book by Malcolm Gladwell

The Tipping Point: How Little Things Can Make a Big Difference
- Paperback edition
- Author: Malcolm Gladwell
- Language: English
- Subject: Psychology, sociology
- Genre: Non-fiction
- Publisher: Little Brown
- Publication date: March 2000
- Publication place: United States
- Media type: Print (paperback)
- Pages: 304
- ISBN: 0-316-34662-4; ISBN 0-316-31696-2 (first edition)
- OCLC: 55586972
- Dewey Decimal: 302 22
- LC Class: HM1033 .G53 2002
- Followed by: Blink

The Tipping Point: How Little Things Can Make a Big Difference is the debut book by Canadian writer Malcolm Gladwell, first published by Little, Brown in 2000. Gladwell defines a tipping point as "the moment of critical mass, the threshold, the boiling point." The book seeks to explain and describe sociological changes that mark everyday life. As Gladwell states: "Ideas and products and messages and behaviors spread like viruses do." The examples of such changes in his book include the rise in popularity and sales of Hush Puppies shoes (Leather Suede Shoes) in the mid-1990s and the steep drop in New York City's crime rate after 1990.

== The three rules ==
Gladwell describes the "three rules of epidemics" (or the three "agents of change") in the tipping points of epidemics.

=== The Law of the Few ===
"The Law of the Few" is, as Gladwell states: "The success of any kind of social epidemic is heavily dependent on the involvement of people with a particular and rare set of social gifts." According to Gladwell, economists call this the "80/20 Principle, which is the idea that in any situation roughly 80 percent of the 'work' will be done by 20 percent of the participants" (see Pareto Principle). These people are described in the following ways:

- Connectors are the people in a community who know large numbers of people and who are in the habit of making introductions. A connector is essentially the social equivalent of a computer network hub. They usually know people across an array of social, cultural, professional, and economic circles, and make a habit of introducing people who work or live in different circles. They are people who "link us up with the world...people with a special gift for bringing the world together." They are "a handful of people with a truly extraordinary knack [... for] making friends and acquaintances." Gladwell characterizes these individuals as having social networks of over one hundred people. To illustrate, he cites the following examples: the midnight ride of Paul Revere, Milgram's experiments in the small world problem, the "Six Degrees of Kevin Bacon" trivia game, Dallas businessman Roger Horchow, and Chicagoan Lois Weisberg, a person who understands the concept of the weak tie. Gladwell attributes the social success of Connectors to the fact that "their ability to span many different worlds is a function of something intrinsic to their personality, some combination of curiosity, self-confidence, sociability, and energy."

- Mavens are "information specialists", or "people we rely upon to connect us with new information." They accumulate knowledge, especially about the marketplace, and know how to share it with others. Gladwell cites Mark Alpert as a prototypical Maven who is "almost pathologically helpful", further adding, "he can't help himself." In this vein, Alpert himself concedes, "A Maven is someone who wants to solve other people's problems, generally by solving his own." According to Gladwell, Mavens start "word-of-mouth epidemics" due to their knowledge, social skills, and ability to communicate. As Gladwell states: "Mavens are really information brokers, sharing and trading what they know."

- Salesmen are "persuaders", charismatic people with powerful negotiation skills. They tend to have an indefinable trait that goes beyond what they say, which makes others want to agree with them. Gladwell's examples include California businessman Tom Gau and news anchor Peter Jennings, and he cites several studies about the persuasive implications of non-verbal cues, including a headphone nod study (conducted by Gary Wells of the University of Alberta and Richard Petty of the University of Missouri) and William S. Condon's cultural microrhythms study.

=== The Stickiness Factor ===
The Stickiness Factor refers to the specific content of a message that renders its impact memorable. Popular children's television programs such as Sesame Street and Blue's Clues pioneered the properties of the stickiness factor, thus enhancing effective retention of educational content as well as entertainment value. Gladwell states, "Kids don't watch when they are stimulated and look away when they are bored. They watch when they understand and look away when they are confused" (Gladwell, p. 102).

=== The Power of Context ===
Human behavior is sensitive to and strongly influenced by its environment. Gladwell explains: "Epidemics are sensitive to the conditions and circumstances of the times and places in which they occur." For example, "zero tolerance" efforts to combat minor crimes such as farebeating and vandalism of the New York subway led to a decline in more violent crimes citywide. Gladwell describes the bystander effect, and explains how Dunbar's number plays into the tipping point, using Rebecca Wells' novel Divine Secrets of the Ya-Ya Sisterhood, evangelist John Wesley, and the high-tech firm W. L. Gore and Associates as examples. Dunbar's number is the maximum number of individuals in a society or group that someone can have real social relationships with, which Gladwell dubs the "rule of 150."

== Other key concepts ==
Gladwell also includes two chapters of case studies, situations in which tipping point concepts were used in specific situations. These situations include the athletic shoe company Airwalk, the diffusion model, how rumors are spread, decreasing the spread of syphilis in Baltimore, teen suicide in Micronesia, and teen smoking in the United States.

== Reception ==
=== Public ===
Gladwell received an estimated US$1–1.5 million advance for The Tipping Point, which sold 1.7 million copies by 2006. In the wake of the book's success, Gladwell was able to earn as much as $40,000 per lecture. Sales increased again in 2006 after the release of Gladwell's next book, Blink. The Guardian ranked The Tipping Point #94 in its list of 100 Best Books of the 21st Century.

=== Scientific ===
Some of Gladwell's analysis as to why the phenomenon of the "tipping point" occurs (particularly in relation to his idea of the "law of the few") and its unpredictable elements is based on the 1967 small-world experiment by social psychologist Stanley Milgram. Milgram distributed letters to 160 students in Nebraska, with instructions that they be sent to a stockbroker in Boston (not personally known to them) by passing the letters to anyone else that they believed to be socially closer to the target. The study found that it took an average of six links to deliver each letter. Of particular interest to Gladwell was the finding that just three friends of the stockbroker provided the final link for half of the letters that arrived successfully. This gave rise to Gladwell's theory that certain types of people are key to the dissemination of information.

In 2003, Duncan Watts, a network theory physicist at Columbia University, repeated the Milgram study by using a web site to recruit 61,000 people to send messages to 18 targets worldwide. He successfully reproduced Milgram's results (the average length of the chain was approximately six links). However, when he examined the pathways taken, he found that "hubs" (highly connected people) were not crucial. Only 5% of the e-mail messages had passed through one of the hubs. This casts doubt on Gladwell's assertion that specific types of people are responsible for bringing about large levels of change.

Watts pointed out that if it were as simple as finding the individuals that can disseminate information prior to a marketing campaign, advertising agencies would presumably have a far higher success rate than they do. He also stated that Gladwell's theory does not square with much of his research into human social dynamics performed in the last ten years.

Economist Steven Levitt and Gladwell have a running dispute about whether the fall in New York City's crime rate can be attributed to the actions of the police department and "Fixing Broken Windows" (as claimed in The Tipping Point). In Freakonomics, Levitt attributes the decrease in crime to two primary factors: 1) a drastic increase in the number of police officers trained and deployed on the streets and hiring Raymond W. Kelly as police commissioner (thanks to the efforts of former mayor David Dinkins) and 2) a decrease in the number of unwanted children made possible by Roe v. Wade, causing crime to drop nationally in all major cities—"[e]ven in Los Angeles, a city notorious for bad policing". And although psychologist Steven Pinker argues the second factor relies on tenuous links, recent evidence seems to uphold the likelihood of a significant causal link.

== Revenge of the Tipping Point ==
A sequel was released in 2024, titled Revenge of the Tipping Point. This book revisits Gladwell's previous work and retouches on some key ideas.

== See also ==
- Tipping point (sociology)
- Micromotives and Macrobehavior
- Diffusion of innovations
- Epidemiology
- Fold catastrophe
- Hundredth monkey effect
- Meme
- Made to Stick
- Microtrends: The Small Forces Behind Tomorrow's Big Changes
- The Big Mo
