= Jacob Weisberg =

American political journalist (born 1964)

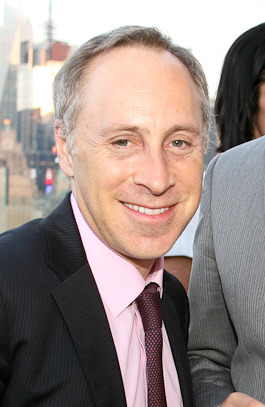
- Weisberg in New York, 2012
- Born: 1964 (age 61–62); Chicago, Illinois, United States
- Education: Yale University (BA); New College, Oxford (attended)
- Occupations: Writer, journalist
- Spouse: Deborah Needleman
- Children: 2

Jacob Weisberg (born 1964) is an American political journalist who served as editor-in-chief of The Slate Group, a division of Graham Holdings Company. In 2018, he left Slate to co-found Pushkin Industries, an audio content company, with Canadian journalist Malcolm Gladwell. Weisberg was also a Newsweek columnist. He served as the editor of Slate magazine for six years before stepping down in 2008. He is the son of Lois Weisberg, a Chicago social activist and municipal commissioner.

== Early life and education ==
Weisberg was born to Jewish parents in Chicago. His mother is community activist Lois Weisberg, and his father, Bernard Weisberg, was a lawyer and judge. They were introduced at a cocktail party by novelist Ralph Ellison. His brother is former CIA officer and television writer and producer Joe Weisberg.

Weisberg attended Yale University, where he worked for the Yale Daily News. As a junior, he was offered membership in Skull and Bones by then lieutenant governor of Massachusetts John Kerry, but he declined the offer, citing the club's exclusion of women. Weisberg graduated in 1986.

The Washington Post's Robert G. Kaiser persuaded Weisberg to join Elihu Society. After Yale, he attended New College, Oxford, on a Rhodes Scholarship.

== Career ==
Weisberg is the Executive Chair of Pushkin Industries, a media company focused on audio content that he co-founded with Malcolm Gladwell. Pushkin focuses on creating podcasts, audiobooks, and short-form audio content. It produces the podcast Revisionist History, hosted by Gladwell, which was previously produced by Panoply Media, a division of Slate Group. Until September 2018, Weisberg was the Editor in Chief of Slate Group.

Previously, Weisberg was a commentator on National Public Radio. He also worked for The New Republic in Washington, D.C., and was a contributing writer for The New York Times Magazine and a contributing editor to Vanity Fair. He has served as a columnist for the Financial Times. Early in his career, he worked for Newsweek in the London and Washington bureaus. He has also worked as a freelance journalist for numerous publications.

=== Books ===
The creator and author of the Bushisms series, Weisberg published The Bush Tragedy in 2008. He is also the author, with former Goldman Sachs executive and Secretary of the Treasury Robert Rubin, of the latter's memoir, In an Uncertain World: Tough Choices from Wall Street to Washington, a New York Times bestseller and one of Business Week's ten best business books of 2003.

Weisberg's first book, In Defense of Government, was published in 1996.

He chaired the judging panel for the 2009 BBC Samuel Johnson Prize for excellence in non-fiction writing.

== Personal life ==
Weisberg is married to style and fashion journalist Deborah Needleman, editor of Domino magazine and former editor-in-chief of T: The New York Times Style Magazine.

== Works ==
- The Bush Tragedy. Random House Publishing Group. January 15, 2008. ISBN 978-1-58836-693-1.
- Ronald Reagan: The American Presidents Series: The 40th President, 1981-1989. Henry Holt and Company. January 5, 2016. ISBN 978-0-8050-9728-3.
- Robert Edward Rubin; Jacob Weisberg (2004). In an Uncertain World: Tough Choices from Wall Street to Washington. Random House. ISBN 978-0-375-75730-3.
- What Are Impeachable Offenses? September 28, 2017 issue of New York Review Books, with Noah Feldman
- Profiles in Cowardice: A Study of Collaboration in the Trump Era. Penguin Press. September 15, 2026. ISBN 979-8-217-06259-1.
