= Malcolm Gladwell =

Canadian journalist and author (born 1963)

Malcolm Gladwell CM
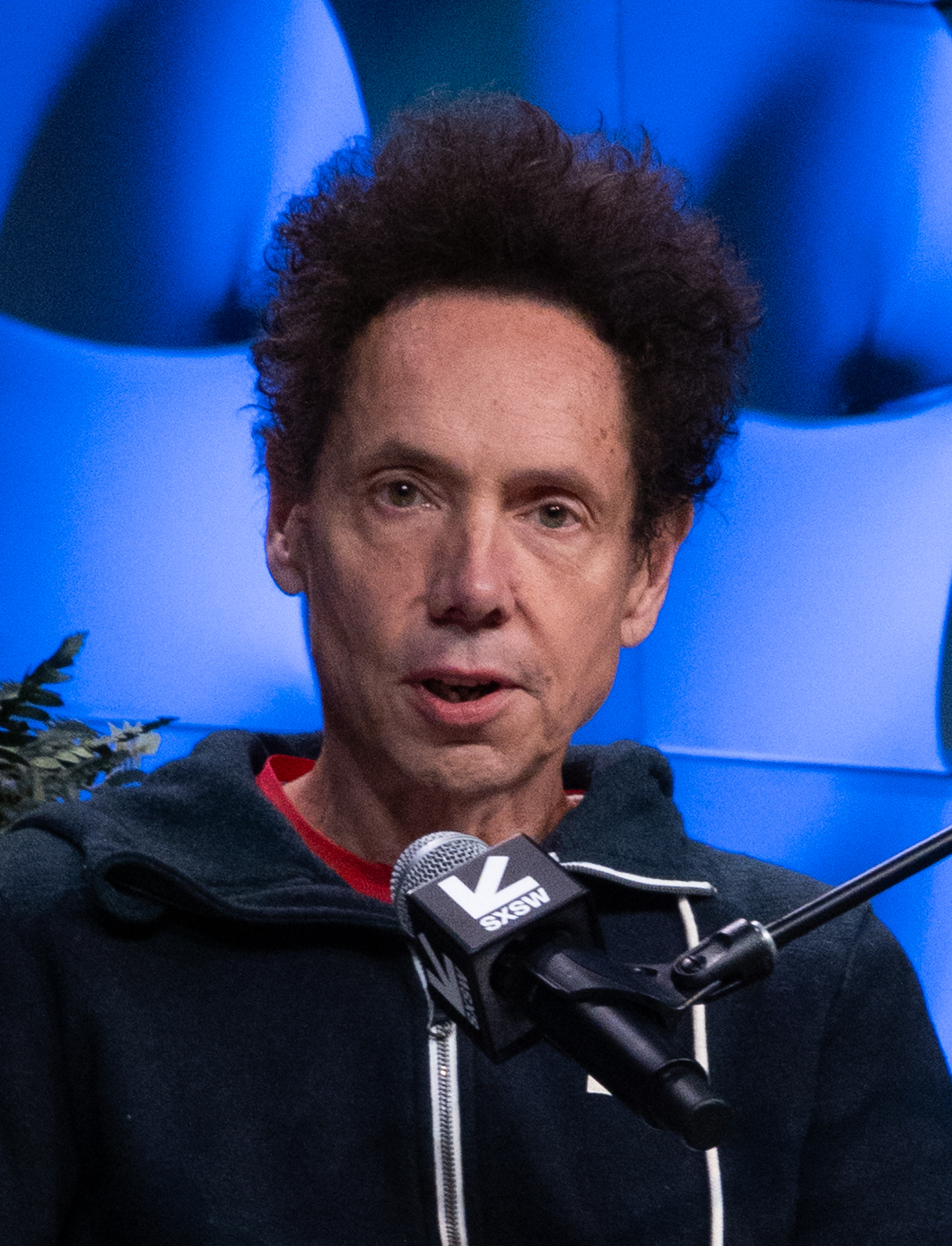
- Gladwell at SXSW 2025
- Born: Malcolm Timothy Gladwell; September 3, 1963 (age 63); Fareham, England
- Education: University of Toronto (BA)
- Occupations: Non-fiction writer, journalist, public speaker
- Years active: 1987–present
- Notable work: The Tipping Point (2000); Blink (2005); Outliers (2008); What the Dog Saw (2009); David and Goliath (2013); Talking to Strangers (2019); The Bomber Mafia (2021); Revenge of the Tipping Point (2024); Revisionist History (podcast; 2016–present)
- Website: gladwellbooks.com

Malcolm Timothy Gladwell CM (born September 3, 1963) is a British-Canadian journalist, author, and public speaker. He has been a staff writer for The New Yorker since 1996. He has published eight books. He is also the host of the podcast Revisionist History and co-founder of the podcast company Pushkin Industries.

Gladwell's writings often deal with the unexpected implications of research in the social sciences, such as sociology and psychology, and make frequent and extended use of academic work. Gladwell was appointed to the Order of Canada in 2011.

== Early life and education ==
Gladwell was born in Fareham, Hampshire, in England. His mother Joyce (née Nation) Gladwell, is a Jamaican psychotherapist. His father, Graham Gladwell, was a mathematics professor from Kent, England. When he was six his family moved from Southampton to the Mennonite community of Elmira, Ontario, Canada. He has two brothers. Throughout his childhood, Malcolm lived in rural Ontario Mennonite country, where he attended a Mennonite church. Research done by historian Henry Louis Gates Jr. revealed that one of Gladwell's maternal ancestors was a Jamaican free woman of colour (mixed black and white) who was a slaveowner. His great-great-great-grandmother was of Igbo ethnicity from Nigeria. In the epilogue of his 2008 book Outliers he describes many lucky circumstances that came to his family over the course of several generations, contributing to his path toward success. Gladwell has said that his mother is his role model as a writer.

Gladwell's father noted that Malcolm was an unusually single-minded and ambitious boy. When Malcolm was 11, his father, a professor of mathematics and engineering at the University of Waterloo, allowed his son to wander around the offices at his university, which developed Malcolm's interest in reading and libraries. In the spring of 1982, Gladwell interned with the National Journalism Center in Washington, D.C. He graduated with a bachelor's degree in history from Trinity College at the University of Toronto in 1984.

== Career ==
Gladwell decided to pursue advertising as a career after college. After being rejected by every advertising agency he applied to, he accepted a journalism position at the conservative magazine The American Spectator and moved to Indiana. He subsequently wrote for Insight on the News, a conservative magazine owned by Sun Myung Moon's Unification Church. In 1987, Gladwell began covering business and science for The Washington Post, where he worked until 1996. In a personal elucidation of the 10,000-hour rule he popularized in Outliers, Gladwell notes, "I was a basket case at the beginning, and I felt like an expert at the end. It took 10 years—exactly that long."

When Gladwell started at The New Yorker in 1996, he wanted to "mine current academic research for insights, theories, direction, or inspiration". His first assignment was to write a piece about fashion. Instead of writing about high-class fashion, Gladwell opted to write a piece about a man who manufactured T-shirts, saying: "[I]t was much more interesting to write a piece about someone who made a T-shirt for $8 than it was to write about a dress that costs $100,000. I mean, you or I could make a dress for $100,000, but to make a T-shirt for $8—that's much tougher."

Gladwell gained popularity with two New Yorker articles, both written in 1996: "The Tipping Point" and "The Coolhunt". These two pieces would become the basis for Gladwell's first book, The Tipping Point, for which he received a $1 million advance. He continues to write for The New Yorker. Gladwell also was a contributing editor for Grantland, a sports journalism website founded by former ESPN columnist Bill Simmons.

== Works ==
With the release of Revenge of the Tipping Point: Overstories, Superspreaders, and the Rise of Social Engineering in 2024, Gladwell has had eight books published.

When asked for the process behind his writing, he said: "I have two parallel things I'm interested in. One is, I'm interested in collecting interesting stories, and the other is I'm interested in collecting interesting research. What I'm looking for is cases where they overlap."

=== The Tipping Point ===
The initial inspiration for his first book, The Tipping Point, which was published in 2000, came from the sudden drop of crime in New York City. He wanted the book to have a broader appeal than just crime, however, and sought to explain similar phenomena through the lens of epidemiology. While Gladwell was a reporter for The Washington Post, he covered the AIDS epidemic. He began to take note of "how strange epidemics were", saying epidemiologists have a "strikingly different way of looking at the world". The term "tipping point" comes from the moment in an epidemic when the virus reaches critical mass and begins to spread at a much higher rate.

Gladwell's theories of crime were heavily influenced by the "broken windows theory" of policing, and Gladwell is credited for packaging and popularizing the theory in a way that was implementable in New York City. Gladwell's theoretical implementation bears a striking resemblance to the "stop-and-frisk" policies of the NYPD. However, in the thirteen years since its publication, The Tipping Point and Gladwell have both come under fire for the tenuous link between "broken windows" and New York City's drop in violent crime. During a 2013 interview with BBC journalist Jon Ronson for The Culture Show, Gladwell admitted that he was "too in love with the broken-windows notion". He went on to say that he was "so enamored by the metaphorical simplicity of that idea that I overstated its importance".

The Sunday Times described the book as one of the 12 most influential books since World War II.

=== Blink ===
After The Tipping Point, Gladwell published Blink in 2005. The book attempts to explain how the human unconscious interprets events or cues as well as how past experiences can lead people to make informed decisions very rapidly. Gladwell uses examples like the Getty kouros and psychologist John Gottman's research on the likelihood of divorce in married couples. Gladwell's hair was the inspiration for Blink. He stated that once he allowed his hair to get longer, he started to get speeding tickets all the time, an oddity considering that he had never gotten one before and that he started getting pulled out of airport security lines for special attention. In a particular incident, he was apprehended by three police officers while walking in downtown Manhattan because his curly hair matched the profile of a rapist, despite the fact the suspect looked nothing like him otherwise.

Gladwell's The Tipping Point (2000) and Blink (2005) were international bestsellers. The Tipping Point sold more than two million copies in the United States. Blink sold equally well. As of November 2008, the two books had sold a combined 4.5 million copies.

=== Outliers ===
Gladwell's third book, Outliers, published in 2008, examines how a person's environment, in conjunction with personal drive and motivation, affects his or her possibility and opportunity for success. Gladwell's original question revolved around lawyers: "We take it for granted that there's this guy in New York who's the corporate lawyer, right? I just was curious: Why is it all the same guy?", referring to the fact that "a surprising number of the most powerful and successful corporate lawyers in New York City have almost the exact same biography". In another example given in the book, Gladwell noticed that people ascribe Bill Gates's success to being "really smart" or "really ambitious". He noted that he knew a lot of people who are really smart and really ambitious, but not worth $60 billion. "It struck me that our understanding of success was really crude—and there was an opportunity to dig down and come up with a better set of explanations."

=== What the Dog Saw ===
Gladwell's fourth book, What the Dog Saw: And Other Adventures, was published in 2009. What the Dog Saw bundles together Gladwell's favourites of his articles from The New Yorker since he joined the magazine as a staff writer in 1996. The stories share a common theme, namely that Gladwell tries to show us the world through the eyes of others, even if that other happens to be a dog.

=== David and Goliath ===
Gladwell's fifth book, David and Goliath, was released in October 2013, and examines the struggle of underdogs versus favourites. The book is partially inspired by an article Gladwell wrote for The New Yorker in 2009 titled "How David Beats Goliath". The book was a bestseller but received mixed reviews.

=== Talking to Strangers ===
Gladwell's sixth book, Talking to Strangers, was released September 2019. The book examines interactions with strangers, covers examples that include the deceptions of Bernie Madoff, the trial of Amanda Knox, the suicide of Sylvia Plath, the Jerry Sandusky pedophilia case at Penn State, and the death of Sandra Bland. Gladwell explained what inspired him to write the book as being "struck by how many high profile cases in the news were about the same thing—strangers misunderstanding each other." It challenges the assumptions we are programmed to make when encountering strangers, and the potentially dangerous consequences of misreading people we do not know.

=== The Bomber Mafia ===
Gladwell's seventh book, The Bomber Mafia: A Dream, a Temptation, and the Longest Night of the Second World War, was released in April 2021.

=== Revenge of the Tipping Point ===
Gladwell's eighth book, Revenge of the Tipping Point was released in October 2024. The book is a sequel commemorating the 25 year history of best selling first book, The Tipping Point, which was released in 2000. The book discusses social epidemics and tipping points, this time with the aim of explaining the dark side of contagious phenomena, and offers an alternate history of two of the biggest epidemics of our day: COVID and the opioid crisis.

=== The American Way of Killing ===
The American Way of Killing: The Invention of an Epidemic is a 2026 nonfiction book by Malcolm Gladwell that examines why the United States experiences far higher levels of homicide and gun violence than other wealthy democracies. Rather than focusing on a simple gun-control-versus-gun-rights debate, Gladwell argues that Americans often misunderstand the true nature of the violence problem.

== Reception ==
=== Positive reviews ===
The Tipping Point was named as one of the best books of the decade by The A.V. Club, The Guardian, and The Times. It was also Barnes & Noble's fifth-best-selling non-fiction book of the decade. Blink was named to Fast Company's list of the best business books of 2005. It was also number 5 on Amazon customers' favourite books of 2005, named to The Christian Science Monitor's best non-fiction books of 2005, and in the top 50 of Amazon customers' favourite books of the decade. Outliers was a number 1 New York Times bestseller for 11 straight weeks and was Time's number 10 non-fiction book of 2008 as well as named to the San Francisco Chronicle's list of the 50 best non-fiction books of 2008.

Fortune described The Tipping Point as "a fascinating book that makes you see the world in a different way". The Daily Telegraph called it "a wonderfully offbeat study of that little-understood phenomenon, the social epidemic".

Reviewing Blink, The Baltimore Sun dubbed Gladwell "the most original American journalist since the young Tom Wolfe." Farhad Manjoo at Salon described the book as "a real pleasure. As in the best of Gladwell's work, Blink brims with surprising insights about our world and ourselves." The Economist called Outliers "a compelling read with an important message". David Leonhardt wrote in The New York Times Book Review: "In the vast world of nonfiction writing, Malcolm Gladwell is as close to a singular talent as exists today" and Outliers "leaves you mulling over its inventive theories for days afterward". Ian Sample wrote in The Guardian: "Brought together, the pieces form a dazzling record of Gladwell's art. There is depth to his research and clarity in his arguments, but it is the breadth of subjects he applies himself to that is truly impressive."

In 2012, CBS's 60 Minutes attributed the trend of American parents "redshirting" their five-year-olds (postponing entrance into kindergarten to give them an advantage) to a section in Gladwell's Outliers.

Sociology professor Shayne Lee referenced Outliers in a CNN editorial commemorating Martin Luther King Jr.'s birthday. Lee discussed the strategic timing of King's ascent from a "Gladwellian perspective". Gladwell gives credit to Richard Nisbett and Lee Ross for inventing the Gladwellian genre.

=== Criticisms ===
Gladwell's critics have described him as prone to oversimplification. The New Republic called the final chapter of Outliers, "impervious to all forms of critical thinking" and said Gladwell believes "a perfect anecdote proves a fatuous rule". Gladwell has also been criticized for his emphasis on anecdotal evidence over research to support his conclusions. Maureen Tkacik and Steven Pinker have challenged the integrity of Gladwell's approach. Even while praising Gladwell's writing style and content, Pinker summed up Gladwell as "a minor genius who unwittingly demonstrates the hazards of statistical reasoning", while accusing him of "cherry-picked anecdotes, post-hoc sophistry and false dichotomies" in his book Outliers. Referencing a Gladwell reporting mistake in which Gladwell refers to "eigenvalue" as "Igon Value", Pinker criticizes his lack of expertise: "I will call this the Igon Value Problem: when a writer's education on a topic consists in interviewing an expert, he is apt to offer generalizations that are banal, obtuse or flat wrong." A writer in The Independent accused Gladwell of posing "obvious" insights. The British website The Register has accused Gladwell of making arguments by weak analogy and commented Gladwell has an "aversion for fact", adding: "Gladwell has made a career out of handing simple, vacuous truths to people and dressing them up with flowery language and an impressionistic take on the scientific method." In that regard, The New Republic has called him "America's Best-Paid Fairy-Tale Writer". His approach was satirized by the online site "The Malcolm Gladwell Book Generator".

In 2005, Gladwell commanded a $45,000 speaking fee. In 2008, he was making "about 30 speeches a year—most for tens of thousands of dollars, some for free", according to a profile in New York magazine. In 2011, he gave three talks to groups of small businessmen as part of a three-city speaking tour put on by Bank of America. The program was titled "Bank of America Small Business Speaker Series: A Conversation with Malcolm Gladwell". Paul Starobin, writing in the Columbia Journalism Review, said the engagement's "entire point seemed to be to forge a public link between a tarnished brand (the bank), and a winning one (a journalist often described in profiles as the epitome of cool)". An article by Melissa Bell of The Washington Post posed the question: "Malcolm Gladwell: Bank of America's new spokesman?" Mother Jones editor Clara Jeffery said Gladwell's job for Bank of America had "terrible ethical optics". However, Gladwell says he was unaware that Bank of America was "bragging about his speaking engagements" until the Atlantic Wire emailed him. Gladwell explained:

I did a talk about innovation for a group of entrepreneurs in Los Angeles a while back, sponsored by Bank of America. They liked the talk, and asked me to give the same talk at two more small business events—in Dallas and yesterday in D.C. That's the extent of it. No different from any other speaking gig. I haven't been asked to do anything else and imagine that's it.

Gladwell has provided blurbs for "scores of book covers", leading The New York Times to ask, "Is it possible that Mr. Gladwell has been spreading the love a bit too thinly?" Gladwell, who said he did not know how many blurbs he had written, acknowledged, "The more blurbs you give, the lower the value of the blurb. It's the tragedy of the commons."

== Podcast ==
Gladwell is host of the podcast Revisionist History, initially produced through Panoply Media and now through Gladwell's own podcast company. It began in 2016 and has aired seven 10-episode seasons. Each episode begins with an inquiry about a person, event, or idea, and proceeds to question the received wisdom about the subject. Gladwell was recruited to create a podcast by Jacob Weisberg, editor-in-chief of The Slate Group, which also includes the podcast network Panoply Media. In September 2018, Gladwell announced he was co-founding a podcast company, later named Pushkin Industries, with Weisberg. About this decision, Gladwell told the Los Angeles Times: "There is a certain kind of whimsy and emotionality that can only be captured on audio."

He also has a music podcast with Bruce Headlam and Rick Rubin, titled Broken Record where they interview musicians. It has two seasons, 2018–2019 and 2020 with a total of 49 episodes.

The Unusual Suspects with Kenya Barris and Malcom Gladwell, premiered January 30, 2025. The podcast features candid interviews with influential figures across a spectrum of disciplines. A common thread throughout these interviews are discussions about each subject's path to success. Interview subjects have ranged from trailblazing Fortune 500 CEO Ursula Burns to hip hop recording artist and producer Dr. Dre.

== Personal life ==
Gladwell is a Christian. His family attended Above Bar Church in Southampton, U.K., and later Gale Presbyterian in Elmira when they moved to Canada. His parents and siblings are part of the Mennonite community in Southwestern Ontario. Gladwell wandered away from his Christian roots when he moved to New York, only to rediscover his faith while writing David and Goliath and his encounter with Wilma Derksen regarding the death of her child.

Gladwell was a national class runner and an Ontario High School (Ontario Federation of School Athletic Associations – OFSAA) champion. He was among Canada's fastest teenagers at 1500 metres, running 4:14 at the age of 13 and 4:05 when aged 14. At university, Gladwell ran 1500 metres in 3:55. In 2014, at the age of 51, he ran a 4:54 at the Fifth Avenue Mile. At 57 he ran a 5:15 mile.

His first child, a daughter, was born in 2022. In 2024 it was reported that "In a span of five years, he got engaged, had two children, turned 61, and moved from Manhattan to the small town of Hudson, New York."

== Awards and honours ==
In 2005, Time named Gladwell one of its 100 most influential people.

In 2007, he received the American Sociological Association's first Award for Excellence in the Reporting of Social Issues. The same year, he received an honorary degree from the University of Waterloo.

In 2011, he was named a Member of the Order of Canada, the fifth highest honour for merit in the system of orders, decorations, and medals of Canada.

He has received honorary degrees from the University of Waterloo (2007) and the University of Toronto (2011).

His is a recipient of the 2024 Audio Vanguard Award presented by On Air Fest.

== Bibliography ==
=== Books ===
- Gladwell, Malcolm (2000). The Tipping Point: How Little Things Can Make a Big Difference. Boston: Little, Brown. ISBN 0-316-31696-2.
- — (2005). Blink: The Power of Thinking Without Thinking. New York: Little, Brown. ISBN 0-316-17232-4.
- — (2008). Outliers: The Story of Success. New York: Little, Brown & Co. ISBN 978-0-316-01792-3.
- — (2009). What the Dog Saw: And Other Adventures. New York: Little, Brown & Co. ISBN 978-0-316-07584-8.
- — (2013). David and Goliath: Underdogs, Misfits, and the Art of Battling Giants. New York: Little, Brown & Co. ISBN 978-0-316-20436-1.
- — (2019). Talking to Strangers: What We Should Know About the People We Don't Know. New York: Little, Brown & Co. ISBN 978-0-316-47852-6.
- — (2021). The Bomber Mafia: A Dream, a Temptation, and the Longest Night of the Second World War. New York: Little, Brown & Co. ISBN 978-0-316-29661-8.
- — (2024). Revenge of the Tipping Point: Overstories, Superspreaders, and the Rise of Social Engineering. New York: Little, Brown & Co. ISBN 978-0-316-57580-5.
- — (2026). The American Way of Killing: The Invention of an Epidemic. New York: Little, Brown & Co. ISBN 978-0316603782.

=== Audiobooks ===
- Miracle and Wonder: Conversations with Paul Simon
- I Hate the Ivy League: Riffs and Rants on Elite Education

=== Essays and reporting ===
- Gladwell, Malcolm (September 6, 2004). "The Ketchup Conundrum". The New Yorker.
- — (September 12, 2005). "Letter from Saddleback: The Cellular Church: How Rick Warren's congregation grew". The New Yorker.
- — (February 13, 2006). "Million-Dollar Murray: why problems like homelessness may be easier to solve than to manage". The New Yorker. Archived from the original on March 18, 2015.
- — (November 5, 2007). "Dangerous Minds". The New Yorker.
- — (October 20, 2008). "Late Bloomers". The New Yorker.
- — (October 4, 2010). "Small Change: Why the revolution will not be tweeted". The New Yorker. Archived from the original on January 10, 2011.
- — (November 14, 2011). "The Tweaker". Annals of Technology. The New Yorker. Vol. 87, no. 36. pp. 32–35.
- — (March 31, 2014). "Sacred and profane: how not to negotiate with believers". Annals of Religion. The New Yorker. Vol. 90, no. 6. pp. 22–28.
- — (July 28, 2014). "Trust No One: Kim Philby and the hazards of mistrust". The Critics. A Critic at Large. The New Yorker. Vol. 90, no. 21. pp. 70–75. Archived from the original on July 23, 2014. Includes review of MacIntyre, Ben (2014). A Spy Among Friends: Kim Philby and the Great Betrayal. Crown. ISBN 978-0-80413663-1.
- — (May 4, 2015). "The engineer's lament: two ways of thinking about automotive safety". Dept. of Transportation. The New Yorker. Vol. 91, no. 11. pp. 46–55.
- — (December 26, 2016). "The outside man: what's the difference between Daniel Ellsberg and Edward Snowden?". The Critics. A Critic at Large. The New Yorker. Vol. 92, no. 42. pp. 119–125.

=== Podcasts ===
- Gladwell, Malcolm (2016). Revisionist History. The Slate Group.
- Gladwell, Malcolm & Rubin, Rick (2018). Broken Record. Pushkin Industries.
- Barris, Kenya & Malcolm, Gladwell (2025). The Unusual Suspects with Kenya Barris and Malcolm Gladwell. Khalabo Productions, Inc.

=== Book reviews ===
Date	Review article	Work(s) reviewed
2015	"The Bill". The Critics. Books. The New Yorker. 90 (43): 65–70. January 12, 2015.	Brill, Steven. America's Bitter Pill. Random House.
2015	"Mirror stage: a memoir of working undercover for the Drug Enforcement Administration". The Critics. Books. The New Yorker. 91 (13): 93–96. May 18, 2015.	Follis, Edward & Douglas Century (2014). The Dark Art: My Undercover Life in Global Narco-terrorism. New York: Gotham Books.

=== Filmography ===
- The Missionary (2013, TV movie)

=== Other appearances ===
Gladwell was a featured storyteller for The Moth podcast. He told a story about a well-intentioned wedding toast for a young man and his friends that went wrong.

Gladwell was featured in General Motors "EVerybody in." campaign.

Gladwell is the only guest to have been featured as a headliner at every OZY Fest festival—an annual music and ideas festival produced by OZY Media—other than OZY co-founder and CEO Carlos Watson. Gladwell has also appeared on several television shows for OZY Media, including the Carlos Watson Show (YouTube) and Third Rail With OZY (PBS).

Gladwell has a chapter giving advice in Tim Ferriss's book Tools of Titans.

Gladwell was voiced by Colton Dunn in Solar Opposites S3.E1 The Extremity Triangulator.
