= Nalini Ambady =

American social psychologist of Indian descent

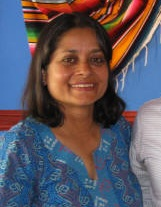
- Nalini Ambady in 2009
- Born: March 20, 1959; Calcutta, India
- Died: October 28, 2013 (aged 54); Boston, Massachusetts, U.S.
- Education: Lady Shri Ram College; College of William and Mary; Harvard University
- Known for: Thin-slicing
- Awards: AAAS Prize for Behavioral Science Research
- Scientific career
- Fields: Psychology
- Workplaces: College of the Holy Cross; Stanford University; Tufts University; Harvard University
- Doctoral advisor: Robert Rosenthal
- Doctoral students: Jon Freeman; Jennifer Richeson; Michael Slepian

Nalini Ambady (March 20, 1959 – October 28, 2013) was an Indian-American social psychologist and a leading expert on nonverbal behavior and interpersonal perception.

== Early life and education ==
A native of the state of Kerala, India, Ambady did her schooling at the Lawrence School, Lovedale, and joined college at the Lady Shri Ram College for Women, Delhi. Subsequently, she moved to the United States for higher education, completing her M.A. in psychology from the College of William & Mary, Virginia. She earned her Ph.D. in social psychology from Harvard University in 1991 under the guidance of Robert Rosenthal, with whom she researched thin slice judgments.

== Academic career ==
She held academic positions at Harvard University and the College of the Holy Cross before being appointed as professor in the Department of Psychology at Tufts University in 2004. She subsequently moved to Stanford University, California in 2011.

Ambady specialized in the study of intuition. Her research found that humans perceive nonverbal cues in response to novel people or situations and that the information gleaned from an instant impression is often as powerful as information gleaned by getting to know a situation or person over a longer period of time. She and Robert Rosenthal coined the term "thin slices" to refer to such instantaneous non-verbal cues. Later, author Malcolm Gladwell referred extensively to Ambady's work in Blink: The Power of Thinking Without Thinking.

One of Ambady's more well-known experiments asked students to watch silent 10-second videos of unfamiliar professors as they taught, and to rate the professors for likability, honesty, competence, and other qualities. The students' responses correlated well with similar ratings by students who had spent a full semester getting to know the professors' personalities and teaching qualities.

=== Founding of SPARQ ===
During Ambady's appointment at Stanford, she founded SPARQ, the Center for Social Psychological Answers to Real-World Questions. The center was initially called "The Lewin Center", after social psychology pioneer Kurt Lewin. SPARQ officially opened its doors in 2014 after Ambady died, but she was active in its formation whilst ill with leukemia until her death. The main goal of SPARQ is to improve society by taking knowledge from the field of social psychology directly to policymakers, teachers and other impactful societal figures. SPARQ is an attempt to address the gap between psychology and the real world and aims to build a bridge between the hands-on experiences of practitioners in the field, and the scientific findings of the lab. SPARQ attempts to accomplish this goal through the fostering of meaningful collaborations between practitioners and social psychologies to the benefit of both.

== Illness and death ==
Ambady was diagnosed with leukemia in May 2004 but recovered after treatment. In 2011, the cancer recurred in a more aggressive form. Her friends and family led a worldwide campaign to find a compatible bone-marrow donor since there were none in existing bone-marrow registries. This was partly due to the low numbers of Indians on registries worldwide and a limited base of donors numbering around 25,000 in the few Indian registries that exist. Her plight sparked a global effort to increase participation in bone marrow registries among South Asian ethnic groups. Though as many as thirteen potential donors were located over a period of time, many of them refused to go through with the transplant process after identification.

Ambady died on October 28, 2013, at Brigham and Women's Hospital in Boston.

== Awards and honours ==
Ambady was a fellow of the American Association for the Advancement of Science, the American Psychological Association, and the Association for Psychological Science. She won the AAAS Prize for Behavioral Science Research in 1993. She was presented the Carol and Ed Diener Award in Social Psychology in 1999 by the Society for Personality and Social Psychology for substantial contribution to the field. She also received the Presidential Early Career Award for Scientists and Engineers from President Bill Clinton.

== Books ==
- R. B. Adams, M.kotag Jr., N. Ambady, K. Nakayama. and S. Shimojo. (2010). Social Vision, Oxford University Press.
- N. Ambady & J. Skowronski (Eds.) (2008). First Impressions, Guilford.
- M. Weisbuch & N. Ambady. Shared Minds in Motion: Dynamic Nonverbal Behavior and Social Influence. Psychology Press: Taylor & Francis.

== See also ==
- Thin-slicing
- Cross-race effect
- Neuroculture
- Perceptions of sexual orientation
