= Jeramie Sanico =

Filipino singer

- Born: Jeramie Sanico; July 1, 1999 (age 27); Mindanao, Philippines
- Origin: Philippines
- Genres: Pop; Ballad
- Occupation: Singer
- Years active: 2016–present

Jeramie Sanico (born July 1, 1999), also known as Jeramie Sanico Heitmann is a Filipino singer based in Australia. She is known for competing on the first season of Tawag ng Tanghalan and for later appearing on The Voice Australia.

== Career ==
=== Tawag ng Tanghalan ===
Sanico was a contestant in Tawag ng Tanghalan Season 1, a segment on the Philippine television variety show It's Showtime. Tagged as the "Student Belter ng Mindanao," she was the daily winner in her first quarter with 5 wins and qualified as a semi-finalist for the quarter. Sanico eventually withdrew from the competition for unknown personal reasons although it has been tied to her faith as a Seventh-day Adventist who does not perform on Saturdays.

=== The Voice Australia ===
After moving to Australia, Sanico only performed her vocals at her house. In 2026, she participated in televised competitions and signed up for The Voice Australia as a contestant in Season 15. At her blind audition, she delivered a rendition of 'Because You Loved Me' by Céline Dion, which secured a four chair-turns from the coaches and helped her land a spot on Team Richard (Richard Marx).

She has described the audition as a return to the stage after about a decade away from television competitions.

== Personal life ==
Sanico is married to an Australian and lives with her children there. After all this time, she continued to issue records and updates as her husband's name, she said that she balances family life and music.
