= Zero-acquaintance personality judgments =

A zero-acquaintance situation requires a perceiver to make a judgment about a target with whom the perceiver has had no prior social interaction. These judgments can be made using a variety of cues, including brief interactions with the target, video recordings of the target, photographs of the target, and observations of the target's personal environments, among others. In zero-acquaintance studies, the target's actual personality is determined through the target's self-rating and/or ratings from close acquaintance(s) of that target. Consensus in ratings is determined by how consistently perceivers rate the target's personality when compared to other raters. Accuracy in ratings is determined by how well perceivers' ratings of a target compare to that target's self-ratings on the same scale, or to that target's close acquaintances' ratings of the target. Zero-acquaintance judgments are regularly made in day-to-day life. Given that these judgments tend to remain stable, even as the length of interaction increases, they can influence important interpersonal outcomes.

== Background ==
=== History ===
The study of zero-acquaintance personality judgments developed from Cleeton and Knight's (1924) intent to demonstrate the futility of using physical criteria to predict unobservable individual traits. In order to accomplish this, Cleeton and Knight (1924) recruited 30 target participants from national fraternities and sororities, so that a large group of close acquaintances from these organizations could rate eight traits (i.e. individual traits included sound judgment, intellectual capacity, frankness, willpower, ability to make friends, leadership, originality, and impulsiveness) of the target participants. Cleeton and Knight (1924) then asked a group of strangers to rate these eight traits of each target participant after viewing the target participant from a distance for only a few minutes. After measuring several objective physical traits of the target participants, such as cranium size and eye width, Cleeton and Knight (1924) found that these physical traits were unrelated to close acquaintances' ratings of unobservable individual traits. However, they found that strangers' rating of an unfamiliar individual's traits were reliable; strangers tended to rate a target's personality similarly. Although these ratings were inaccurate, it became apparent that raters must be using similar indicators to make judgements about individual traits.

Passini and Norman (1966) found comparable evidence that strangers provide similar ratings of unobservable personality traits of a target participant with no prior acquaintanceship. In an introductory undergraduate psychology course, students with no previous interactions were placed into groups and asked to complete personality ratings for each member in the group. Given that the strangers tended to rate a target participant's personality similarly, Passini and Norman (1966) posited that some common observable characteristics must be informing these judgements. In the same year, Taft (1966) demonstrated that strangers can make judgments of personality more accurately than chance, but not as accurately as close acquaintances.

These findings went unnoticed for over twenty years, until Albright, Kenny, and Malloy (1988) revived interest and formally coined the term zero-acquaintance personality judgments. These researchers established that certain physical appearance variables, including attractiveness, type of dress (both formal and neatness), and perceived age, informed strangers' zero-acquaintance personality judgments. Ratings between strangers were most similar to each other and to the target's self-rating for the traits "sociable" and "responsible". Ratings of target attractiveness informed judgements of sociability; formality and neatness of dress informed judgements of responsibility.

=== Consensus in ratings ===
Consensus in zero-acquaintance studies refers to the degree to which multiple perceivers of a target make similar judgments of that target's personality traits. Even from a momentary interaction, multiple perceivers can come to the same conclusion about aspects of a person's personality. A few different explanations exist for this phenomenon. One such explanation is called similar meaning systems. This explanation posits that consensus arises when raters agree on the meaning of the information they use to make personality judgments. Some aspect of the individual (such as facial expressions or posture) appears to have the same meaning to each perceiver. For example, a smile or an erect stance might be an indicator of extraversion (one of the five traits in the five-factor model of personality to all perceivers, therefore these raters will all provide similar extraversion ratings. This does not necessarily mean that the ratings are accurate, just that all perceivers rated the individual similarly.

Stereotypes also influence consensus across perceivers. If perceivers of a target individual hold the same stereotypes about the target and use them in making personality judgments, consensus will be higher. For example, one gender may be stereotypically considered less emotionally stable than the other (neuroticism). Assuming perceivers hold this stereotype, they will make similar emotional stability ratings when the target's gender is known. Again, this does not assume that the stereotype is valid. In fact, some common stereotypes may prove to be invalid; use of such a stereotype by multiple perceivers will result in consistent, but inaccurate ratings (or high consensus and low accuracy).

It is worth noting that different personality traits show different levels of consensus. Of the traits in the Five Factor Model of personality, conscientiousness and extraversion tend to show higher levels of consensus, while agreeableness tends to demonstrate the least consensus. These patterns of findings suggest that some traits are more easily judged from brief interactions and more likely to be agreed upon than others. For example, facial expressions, which often indicate levels of extraversion, are easily detected in brief meetings, pictures, or video clips; perceivers tend to agree on what traits these facial expressions convey. Therefore, consensus tends to be higher for extraversion. Consensus can also result from beliefs about the target's physical attractiveness and traits commonly associated with attractive individuals. For example, extraversion is often associated with physical attractiveness. Because perceivers tend to agree on targets' physical attractiveness, consensus for extraversion is generally high.

Studies examining these differences in consensus across the Big Five traits have found that consensus ratings for extraversion tend to be around .27, compared to consensus of .03 for agreeableness. These numbers indicate how similarly raters view the same target's personality, with higher numbers indicating greater consensus for a particular trait. For agreeableness (with a consensus score of .03), there was virtually no agreement across raters of the target's level of agreeableness. For extraversion, (.27), there was much more consensus about the target's level of extraversion.

Studies have also examined the differences in consensus for zero-acquaintance raters and raters who have been long acquainted with the target. For extraversion, consensus ratings seem to be similar (.27 for zero-acquaintance and .29 for long-term acquaintance). For all other traits, long-term acquaintance ratings tend to converge much more than for zero-acquaintance ratings. For example, ratings of agreeableness demonstrate consensus estimates of .27 when long-term acquaintances are the raters, compared to .03 when there are zero-acquaintance raters. Those who are familiar with the target individual tend to agree about their personality traits much more than individuals who do not know the target, with the exception of extraversion. These study findings suggest that extraversion is a fairly observable trait for any person, whether they know the target or not, and people interpret social cues related to extraversion quite similarly.

=== Accuracy in ratings ===
To determine if the perceiver in a zero-acquaintance context has made an accurate judgment of a target's personality, perceiver ratings are compared to the target's own ratings of their personality. The degree to which these two ratings converge is known as accuracy. Peer ratings (from people who have frequent contact with the individual being rated) can also be used to determine accuracy; if perceiver ratings of a target converge with peer ratings of the target, accuracy has been established. Accuracy is achieved when perceivers use what is known as "good information" about the target to make ratings. Information is "good" when it actually represents the trait being rated. For example, if a smile is actually reflective of extraversion, accuracy will be increased when perceivers use smiles to influence their extraversion ratings. This notion is known as the Realistic Accuracy Model (RAM; David C. Funder). When perceivers utilize good information in their ratings and ignore bad or irrelevant information, accuracy increases.

As mentioned above, both self-ratings and peer-ratings of a target can be used to calculate accuracy; in fact, several researchers suggest it is best to combine self-reports and peer reports when measuring accuracy (self-report inventory). This helps eliminate the flaws of each measure on its own and can increase confidence that the accuracy measure is itself accurate. This combined rating (usually an average of peer- and self-score) is then correlated with the zero-acquaintance perceiver ratings to determine accuracy, in what has been termed the "Gold Standard" in personality research;

Like consensus, accuracy is greater for some traits than others. In fact, a similar pattern to consensus exists, with extraversion and conscientiousness ratings tending to be the most accurate and agreeableness and openness ratings the least accurate of the five-factor model of personality. This is likely due to the trait-relevant information available to perceivers in zero-acquaintance settings. For example, in photographs there is more information present that accurately reflects conscientiousness and extraversion (such as cleanliness and facial expressions), than that which reflects agreeableness or openness.

Sociability-related traits have typically been found to be the easiest to judge when raters have little acquaintance with targets. Since extraversion largely measures social tendencies, it makes sense that the highest consensus and accuracy are found for this trait. Extraversion ratings by peer raters who had little interaction with targets demonstrated validities of .35, compared to validities of .01 for agreeableness. This stark difference in validity suggests that agreeableness is much harder to judge with accuracy when the rater is unfamiliar with the target. Conscientiousness has also demonstrated relatively high accuracy when the rater is unacquainted, with a validity of .29. The validity coefficient tells us how related the raters' judgments are to the target's own ratings of their personality. A validity coefficient of .35 (such as for extraversion) is fairly high, compared to a validity coefficient of .01, which indicates that there is absolutely no relationship between the two sets of ratings.

When raters are not very acquainted with the targets they are rating, it appears that the length of time they are actually able to observe the person doesn't have a strong influence on the accuracy of the behavioral judgments made. When raters have as little as 30 seconds to make a judgment about a target, they have the same level of accuracy as when they have four to five hours. This suggests that several cues about a person can be displayed in very short window of time. Across all ratings in all time windows, accuracy was .39, which is similar to the results of other zero-acquaintance studies.

It is also important to note that while zero-acquaintance judgments can be accurate and particular traits are easy to judge, research generally shows that the greater acquaintance someone has with the target, the more accurate their ratings are. A classic study showed that the Big Five traits on average have higher validity for acquaintances (.40) than strangers (.29). This is a 38% increase in accuracy for acquaintances, compared to strangers. A later study examined this same topic over an extended period of time in order to better test an "acquaintance effect" on ratings. When people were asked to rate targets at multiple points in time, their ratings became more accurate (more similar to the targets' self-ratings) over time, as they got to know the target better. At weeks 1, 4, and 7, accuracy in ratings across the Big Five traits increased from .21 to .26, to .30, respectively. This demonstrates the phenomenon known as the acquaintance effect: over time, as people get to know someone better, they are better able to estimate that target's true personality.

=== Recent research ===
Recent research employing zero-acquaintance situations has largely focused on what traits are judged most consistently and accurately, and in what contexts. The most common contexts for zero-acquaintance judgments are those that allow for the observation of a target's physical appearance. Information about physical attributes is generally garnered in one of two ways: observation or photographs. Observation ratings typically come from video or sound recordings. For example, Borkenau and Liebler (1992) asked perceivers to view either a silent video, audio video, or just audio of targets entering a room, sitting down, and reading a script. Perceivers provided the most accurate judgements for extraversion and agreeableness with both audio and visual cues; conscientiousness was most accurate with visual cues alone.

Interest in photographs has continued to increase in recent years, given the widespread use of these images on social media sites. For example, Naumann, Vazire, Rentfrow, and Gosling (2009) found that perceivers can make more accurate judgments of targets when these targets appear in spontaneous or "strike a pose" photographs than in non-expressive full body photographs. Specifically, perceivers were only able to accurately judge extraversion, self-esteem, and religiosity using a non-expressive full body photograph. When the target struck a pose, however, the perceiver was able to judge extraversion, agreeableness, emotional stability, openness, likeability, self-esteem, loneliness, religiosity, and political orientation with some degree of accuracy. In a more recent study exploring the accuracy of personality judgments in selfie profile pictures, Qiu, Lu, Yang, Qu, and Zhu (2015) found that perceivers only accurately predict openness from selfies; these ratings were formed through impressions of the target's emotional positivity.

Zero-acquaintance personality judgments can also be made through other artifacts, such as personal belongings or social media profiles. Gosling and colleagues (2002) found that perceivers can more accurately rate targets' personality by observing their bedrooms than their offices. When observing the bedrooms, perceivers could accurately rate extraversion, agreeableness, conscientiousness, emotional stability, and openness to experience. When observing the offices, however, perceivers could only accurately rate extraversion, conscientiousness, and openness to experience. The researchers also found which cues informed which rating of personality. For instance, neatness informed judgments of conscientiousness, whereas variety and quantity of books informed judgements of openness to experience. More recently, Back et al. (2010) investigated how well perceivers could make judgements of targets by viewing their social media profiles, either on Facebook or StudiVZ. The researchers found that perceivers could accurately predict extraversion, agreeableness, conscientiousness, and openness of a target by simply perusing the social media profile.

== Implications and unanswered questions ==
Personality judgments made in zero-acquaintance contexts are extremely common in day-to-day life. As can be seen from the studies referenced previously, personality impressions can be formed from extremely brief interactions, physical appearance, and personal environments. As the world becomes increasingly virtual, these zero-acquaintance judgments are becoming even more popular, as people turn to online profiles to infer people's personalities for use in both professional and interpersonal contexts. These judgments can have important implications, as they can influence the decision to further engage with an individual, and how so. For example, when employees were presented with the job application and picture of a fictitious future manager, their zero-acquaintance judgments of personality predicted these employees' willingness to work under this hypothetical manager.

Furthermore, research has indicated that these first personality impressions remain relatively stable over time, even as the extent of interaction with the target person increases over time. In other words, the first impressions created in zero-acquaintance contexts are hard to change, and thus are predictive of further outcomes. For example, student impressions of an instructor on the first day of class were shown to be relatively consistent with impressions after the class had concluded, and thus these judgments predicted student course evaluations. Additionally, interviewer first impressions of interviewees have been shown to influence the amount of information provided by the interviewer during the interview, as well as the communication style and rapport established.

Despite research demonstrating the stability of these zero-acquaintance judgments, as well as their accuracy and consensus, many questions still remain. For example, researchers have just begun to examine how different forms of zero-acquaintance judgments compare to one another. In other words, it is likely that one trait may be better judged in a particular context (e.g. photographs) while a different trait may be more accurately judged via a different context (e.g. video recordings). More research is needed in order to determine exactly which traits are best judged in which contexts.

Additionally, it is possible that different zero-acquaintance contexts may provide conflicting information regarding the same trait. If a perceiver encounters both sources of information, it is unknown which source would be emphasized in the perceiver's judgments. Additionally, the weight that any particular perceiver attributes to one source over another may be influenced by characteristics of that perceiver or of the situation, and future research is needed to investigate this possibility.

Finally, the role of culture and demographics in zero-acquaintance judgments has been identified as an area ripe for further studies. Perceivers from different cultures may judge the same source of information in different ways. Additionally, some sources of information (e.g. writing samples) portray culture and demographics to a lesser extent than others (e.g. photographs), which may lead to important differences in the judgments made. While research has begun to delve into these questions, many remain unanswered.

== See also ==
- Accuracy and precision
- Reliability (psychometrics)
- Social networking service
- Spontaneous trait inference
- Thin-slicing
