= Made to Stick =

2007 book by brothers Chip and Dan Heath

- Hardcover edition
- Author: Chip Heath & Dan Heath
- Language: English
- Subject: Psychology
- Publisher: Random House
- Publication date: January 2, 2007
- Publication place: United States
- Media type: Print, e-book
- Pages: 304 pp.
- ISBN: 1-4000-6428-7
- OCLC: 68786839
- Dewey Decimal: 302/.13 22
- LC Class: HM1033 .H43 2007
- Followed by: Switch: How to Change Things When Change Is Hard

Made to Stick: Why Some Ideas Survive and Others Die is a book by brothers Chip and Dan Heath published by Random House on January 2, 2007. The book expands upon the idea of "stickiness" popularized by Malcolm Gladwell in The Tipping Point, seeking to explain what makes an idea or concept memorable or interesting. The Heaths employed a style similar to Gladwell's by including a number of stories and case studies followed by general principles.

The stories range from urban legends, such as the "Kidney Heist" in the introduction; to business stories, as with the story of Southwest Airlines, "the low price airline"; to inspirational, personal stories such as that of Floyd Lee, a passionate mess hall manager. Each chapter includes a section entitled "Clinic," in which the principles of the chapter are applied to a specific case study or idea to demonstrate the principle's application.

== Overview ==
The book's outline follows the acronym "SUCCES" (with the last s omitted). Each letter refers to a characteristic that can help make an idea "sticky":

- Simple – find the core of any idea or thoughts
- Unexpected – grab people's attention by surprising them
- Concrete – make sure an idea can be grasped and remembered later
- Credible – give an idea believability and credibility
- Emotional – help people see the importance of an idea
- Stories – empower people to use an idea through narrative

== Authors ==
Chip Heath is a professor of organizational behavior at Graduate School of Business at Stanford University. Dan Heath, a former researcher at Harvard, is a consultant and developer of innovative textbooks. They also write a regular feature for Fast Company magazine.

== Reception ==
The book was commercially successful, appearing on the New York Times and Wall Street Journal bestseller lists, alongside a 24-month listing on BusinessWeek book listings.

Writing in The Guardian, William Leith described it as a "smart, lively book" that is "fun to read" and will give readers "an insight into the power of bad ideas" as well as better ones. In her review in the Stanford Social Innovation Review, Judith Samuelson observed that "The Heath brothers have taught me that if anyone is going to 'get' my idea—need it, buy it, fund it, use it—I need to radically shorten my elevator pitch. Writing in BookPages, Eliza McGraw wrote, "How do we make people care about our ideas?, the Heaths ask. We appeal to their self-interest, but we also appeal to their identities not only to the people they are right now but also to the people they would like to be."

== See also ==
- Meme
- Viral marketing
- The Tipping Point, by Malcolm Gladwell, which popularized the concept of "stickiness."
- Think!: Why Crucial Decisions Can't Be Made in the Blink of an Eye
