= Knowledge of human nature =

Knowledge of human nature is the ability to correctly assess the behavior or character of people based on a first impression, and to gauge how they think and predict how they will act.

Life experience, intuition, intelligence, and wisdom are the decisive factors which contribute to this ability. Knowledge of human nature is not innate, but is acquired through frequent contact with people and experience with many different people.

Knowledge of human nature can be used to judge people correctly, to motivate them, to give other people good advice, to deepen relationships, etc. However, it can also be used to exploit people to one's own advantage, for example, if one wants to persuade people, to seduce them, or to sell them something.

There are numerous models for the theoretical acquisition of knowledge of human nature, such as the Myers-Briggs Type Indicator or the Enneagram.

== See also ==
- Soft skills: Life experience and personality typologies
