= Elizabeth Gerber =

American engineer

- Education: Stanford University; Dartmouth College
- Scientific career
- Workplaces: Northwestern University
- Doctoral advisor: Robert Sutton, Chip Heath, Pamela Hinds

Elizabeth Gerber is a tenured professor in the Segal Design Institute, Mechanical Engineering, and Technology and Social Behavior departments at Northwestern University.

== Early life and education ==
Gerber earned her B.A. at Dartmouth College in Studio Art and Engineering in 1998, and her M.S. at Stanford University in the Joint Program in Product Design in 2003. She earned her Ph.D. in Management Science & Engineering at Stanford University in 2007 working with Robert I. Sutton, Chip Heath, and Pamela Hinds.

== Career ==
Gerber has been on the faculty at Northwestern University since 2008. Her primary appointments are in the Segal Design Institute (School of Engineering), Mechanical Engineering (School of Engineering), and Technology and Social Behavior Department (School of Communication). She holds additional appointments by courtesy in Industrial Engineering & Management Science (School of Engineering), Management & Organizations (School of Management), Learning Sciences (School of Education & Social Policy), and Electrical Engineering and Computer Science (School of Engineering).

Gerber is the founder of Design for America, which is an organization of people dedicated to using design innovation for social good.

Her research in design focuses on collective innovation and design education. Collective innovation is the process and study of (potentially) large groups of people who may not be familiar with design practice to work together to solve problems. Design education is thus related in that it considers how to teach students design. Gerber orients her research toward solving problems with positive social outcomes.

== Awards and honors ==
Gerber has received a number of awards and honors for her research, teaching, and outreach, such as the IEEE Computer Science and Engineering Undergraduate Teaching Award. She was named among Crain's Chicago Business 40 under 40. She has received multiple teaching awards at Northwestern University, including the University Teaching Award in 2016 and the Elizabeth Hurlock Beckman Award in 2015.

In 2018, Design for America, the national organization that Gerber founded, received a National Design Award for Corporate and Institutional Achievement from the Cooper Hewitt Smithsonian Design Museum.

== Selected publications ==
- E.M. Gerber, J.S. Hui, and P. Kuo. Crowdfunding: Why people are motivated to post and fund projects on crowdfunding platforms. International Workshop on Design, Influence, and Social Technologies: Techniques, Impacts and Ethics. 2012.
- E.M. Gerber. Improvisation principles and techniques for design. SIGCHI conference on Human factors in computing systems. 2007.
- M.D. Greenberg and E.M. Gerber. Learning to fail: experiencing public failure online through crowdfunding. Proceedings of the SIGCHI Conference on Human Factors in Computing Systems. 2014.
- E.M. Gerber, J.M. Olson, and R.L. Komarek. Extracurricular design-based learning: Preparing students for careers in innovation. International Journal of Engineering Education. 2012.
- M. Dontcheva, R.R. Morris, J.R. Brandt, and E.M. Gerber. Combining crowdsourcing and learning to improve engagement and performance. Proceedings of the SIGCHI Conference on Human Factors in Computing Systems. 2014.
