= Thin slice =

Thin slice may refer to:

- Thin-slicing, a term used in psychology and philosophy to describe the ability to find patterns in events based only on "thin slices," or narrow windows, of experience.
- Thin slice, a presentation form for CT scans.
- In geology, a thin section.
