= Intertrial priming =

Psychological effect

In cognitive psychology, intertrial priming is an accumulation of the priming effect over multiple trials, where "priming" is the effect of the exposure to one stimulus on subsequently presented stimuli. Intertrial priming occurs when a target feature (the characteristic that distinguishes targets from non-targets) is repeated from one trial to the next, and typically results in speeded response times to the target. A target is the stimulus participants are required to search for. For example, intertrial priming occurs when the task is to respond to either a red or a green target, and the response time to a red target is faster if the preceding trial also has a red target.

== Top-down and bottom-up attention ==
Visual attention is influenced by top down and bottom up attentional processes. Top-down attention is allocated based on an observer's current knowledge about the stimuli. Participants in an experiment might be instructed to search for, and respond to a target object presented in a display that is a different colour than the other objects presented simultaneously. Top down knowledge of the dimension of the target (i.e. colour) can speed response times to target identification.

Bottom-up attention is involuntarily and automatically directed towards salient features in the environment such as a bright colour among dull colours. In experimental settings, the more different a stimulus is from other stimuli in a visual display, the more salient it is. Bottom-up attention is typically not guided by observers' goals or knowledge, only by the physical properties of the stimuli. Many studies employ various methods involving intertrial priming to assess the contribution of top down versus bottom up processes in guiding attention in visual search tasks.

=== Integrative framework ===
There are factors in visual search tasks that the top down versus bottom up dichotomy does not take into consideration. Not all selection biases can be explained by physical saliency (bottom up) or observer goals (top down). Studies that have found that stimuli that are equally salient and are connected with rewards and can draw a participants' attention, even if this choice doesn't match their selection goals. An alternative framework has been proposed where past selection history, current goals and physical salience are integrated in a model of attentional control.

== Measuring the effects of intertrial priming ==
Intertrial priming is an important aspect to consider in designing an experiment as it can influence the results if it is not considered/controlled. Intertrial priming is often measured using a visual search task. A typical visual search task involves participants searching for, and responding to, a target amongst a group of non-target items. Intertrial priming performance is generally measured by recording participants' reaction times to identify a target and comparing these times across trials. Different trial designs and visual search tasks can be employed to measure intertrial priming.

=== Blocked and mixed trials ===
Studies often compare blocked and mixed visual search trials to measure intertrial priming. Blocked trials are multiple, successively presented visual search trials that include the same target, and mixed trials are a randomised series of trials, each trial consisting of different targets. For example, a blocked trial condition may include searching for a green circle in trial 1, and in multiple successive preceding trials, whereas a mixed trial condition may include searching a for a green circle in trial 1, but a red circle in the proceeding trials. Blocking trials can control for effects of variability in targets. When a target with the same defining feature is repeated across trials (blocked conditions), participants reaction times are faster than when the target is not the same across trials (mixed conditions). This repetition effect is also cumulative. As the number of target repetitions increases, up to a certain point, participants reaction times are faster each time they are exposed to the same target in repeated trials. In mixed and blocked trials there can be a disparity in intertrial priming that results in faster reaction times in the blocked trials. Reaction times may be faster in blocked trials because participants are required to respond to targets that differ in only one dimension from non-targets.

=== Cueing ===
A cue is a presentation of a stimulus prior to a trial to inform the participant of an upcoming target feature. For example, a blue circle may be shown before a trial to signify a blue circle will be the target in the upcoming trial. Target relevant cues may be presented to participants to decrease their reaction time to the target in the display. These cues may be valid or invalid. Valid cues correctly predict the target stimulus but invalid cues do not. For example, if the target in an upcoming trial is a blue circle, a blue circle presented as a cue would be valid, but if a red circle was presented as a cue it would be invalid, as it does not correctly predict the blue circle target stimulus. Reaction times to valid cues are typically faster than reaction times to invalid cues. This phenomenon is known as a cueing effect.

=== Cue validity effect ===
When a valid cue has a low probability of correct target prediction, there can still be a reliable cueing effect for valid cues, and faster reaction times to valid cues than invalid cues. This suggests that the cueing effect is not affected by the predictive nature of the cue, and may not be due to top-down control. If top-down control is involved in the response selection then invalid trials should have a faster response than valid trials because participants are aware that the likelihood of being presented with a valid trial is very low.

== Types of visual search ==
=== Pop-out search ===
Pop-out search tasks include a target that differs in one dimension from a group of homogeneous non-target items. A dimension is a categorical feature of a stimulus such as its colour (i.e. a red target among green non-targets), its shape (a square target among circle non-targets) or its orientation (a vertically presented target among horizontal non-targets). Response times in pop-out searches are generally faster to targets when the colour of both targets and distractors remains the same throughout trials, and slower when these colours are switched during trials.

=== Conjunctive search ===
A conjunctive search involves non-target stimuli that have more than one dimension in common with the target stimulus. For example, when a target is a green circle in a conjunctive search, non-targets (distractors) could be red circles and green squares. The target will share one dimension in common with one set of non-targets (i.e. shape) and another dimension in common with the other non-target group (i.e. colour). If target and distractor features are the same over consecutive trials, response times are faster than when these dimensions are not repeated.

== Why it occurs (major theories) ==
=== Dimension-weighting account theory ===
The "dimension-weighting account" of visual selection states that there is a limit to the attentional weight that can be allocated to a particular dimension of an object at any one time. The dimensions of stimuli perceived as important to an observer are allocated more attentional weight (i.e. a target in a visual search), resulting in faster detection times. If a target dimension is known in advance, this can increase the saliency signals of the target. On the other hand, if the target dimension is unknown, attentional weight has to be shifted to the target dimension. When target dimensions remain the same across trials there is no change in attentional weight required, resulting in faster reaction times (intertrial facilitation).

=== Priming of pop-out hypothesis ===
The priming of pop-out hypothesis suggests performance in a visual search task involving a pop-out target can be affected by the search history of specific target features in previous trials. If target and distractor features are repeated in subsequent trials, reaction times will be faster than if these features change across trials. The hypothesis proposes the repetition of a target used in a preceding trial makes its pop-out features more salient to an observer and therefore increases the likelihood the observer will attend to it.

=== Episodic retrieval hypothesis ===
The episodic retrieval model suggests reduced response times in intertrial priming are due to the observers' retrieval of episodic memories relevant to the task. The hypothesis states that visual search is composed of three successive stages of processing:

1. search for a target,
2. decide if the chosen target is the target of interest, and
3. select and respond to the chosen target.

This hypothesis argues that when a target presented in a previous trial is presented again in the current trial, processing of the target is accelerated in the target decision stage of the model, so that after identification the target is verified to assess whether it matches the previous target stored in episodic memory.

=== Perceptual grouping of distractors account ===
Many theories focus on the repetition of target features as dominant explanation for the repetition effects seen in intertrial priming. If target features are the same over consecutive trials but distractor features are changed, response times are not as fast as if both target and distractor features are kept constant over trials. This suggests that intertrial priming may mainly be due to distractor feature repetition, and target feature repetition influences this only slightly. This distractor-based priming may be due to faster perceptual grouping of distractors across trials. Perceptual grouping of distractors allows the target presence or absence to be distinguished more quickly. However, the repetition of target defining features cannot be excluded as a contributor to the priming effect found in conjunctive searches.

== See also ==
- Priming
- Thin-slicing
