= Dan Heath =

American author and speaker

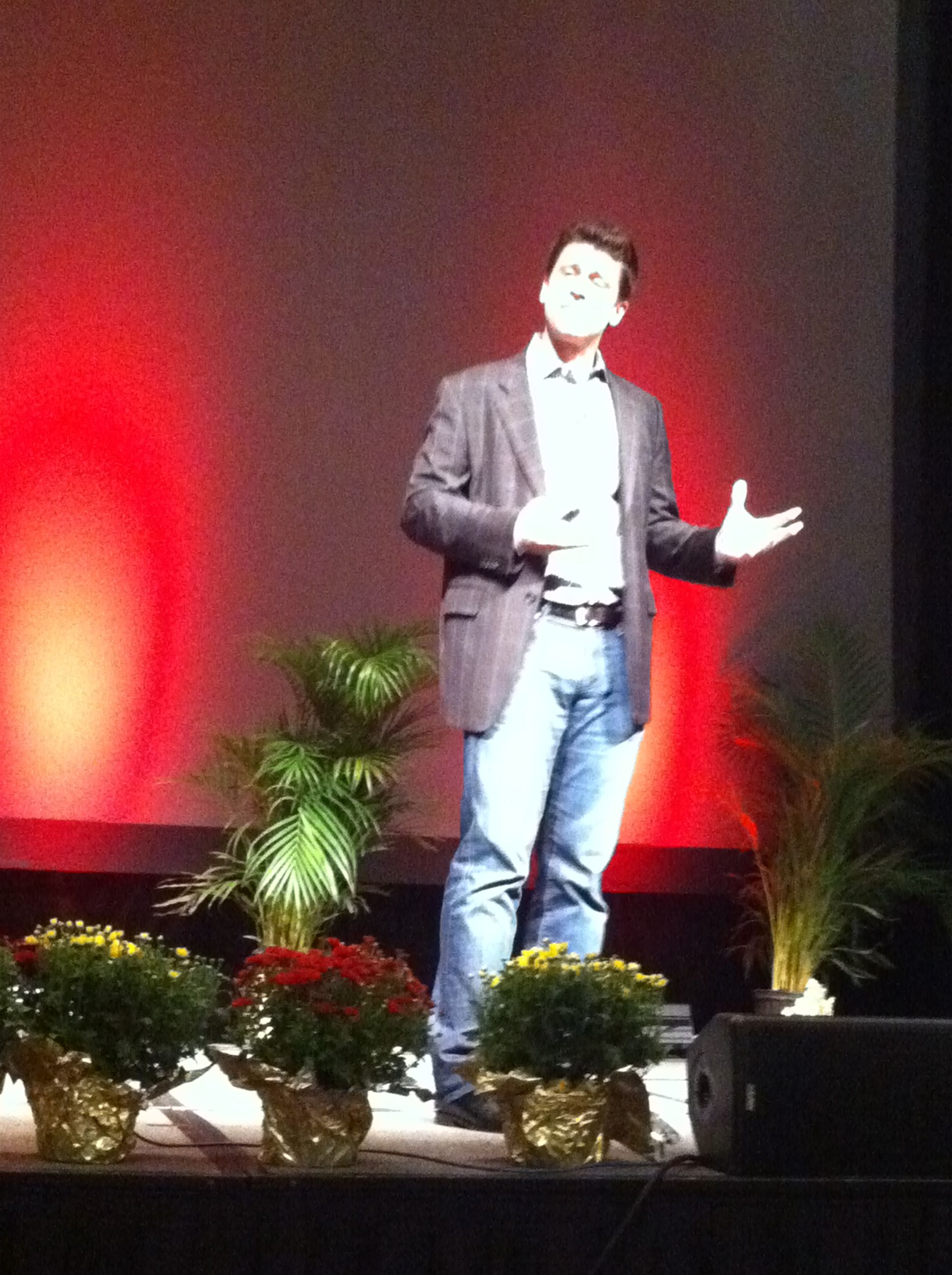
- Dan Heath in 2011
- Occupation: Academic
- Employer: Duke University
- Relatives: Chip Heath (brother)

Dan Heath is an American bestselling author, speaker and fellow at Duke University's CASE center. Together with his brother, Chip Heath, has co-authored four books: Made to Stick: Why Some Ideas Survive and Others Die (2007), Switch: How to Change Things When Change Is Hard (2010), Decisive: How to Make Better Choices in Life and Work, and The Power of Moments: Why Certain Experiences Have Extraordinary Impact (2017). Heath released his first solo work, Upstream: The Quest to Solve Problems Before They Happen, in 2020.

From 2007 to 2011, the Heath brothers wrote a column for Fast Company magazine.

Made to Stick was named the Best Business Book of the Year, appeared on the BusinessWeek bestseller list for 24 months, and has been translated into 29 languages.

In 2018, Heath hosted the first season of Choiceology, a podcast about behavioral economics.
