= Michael Slepian =

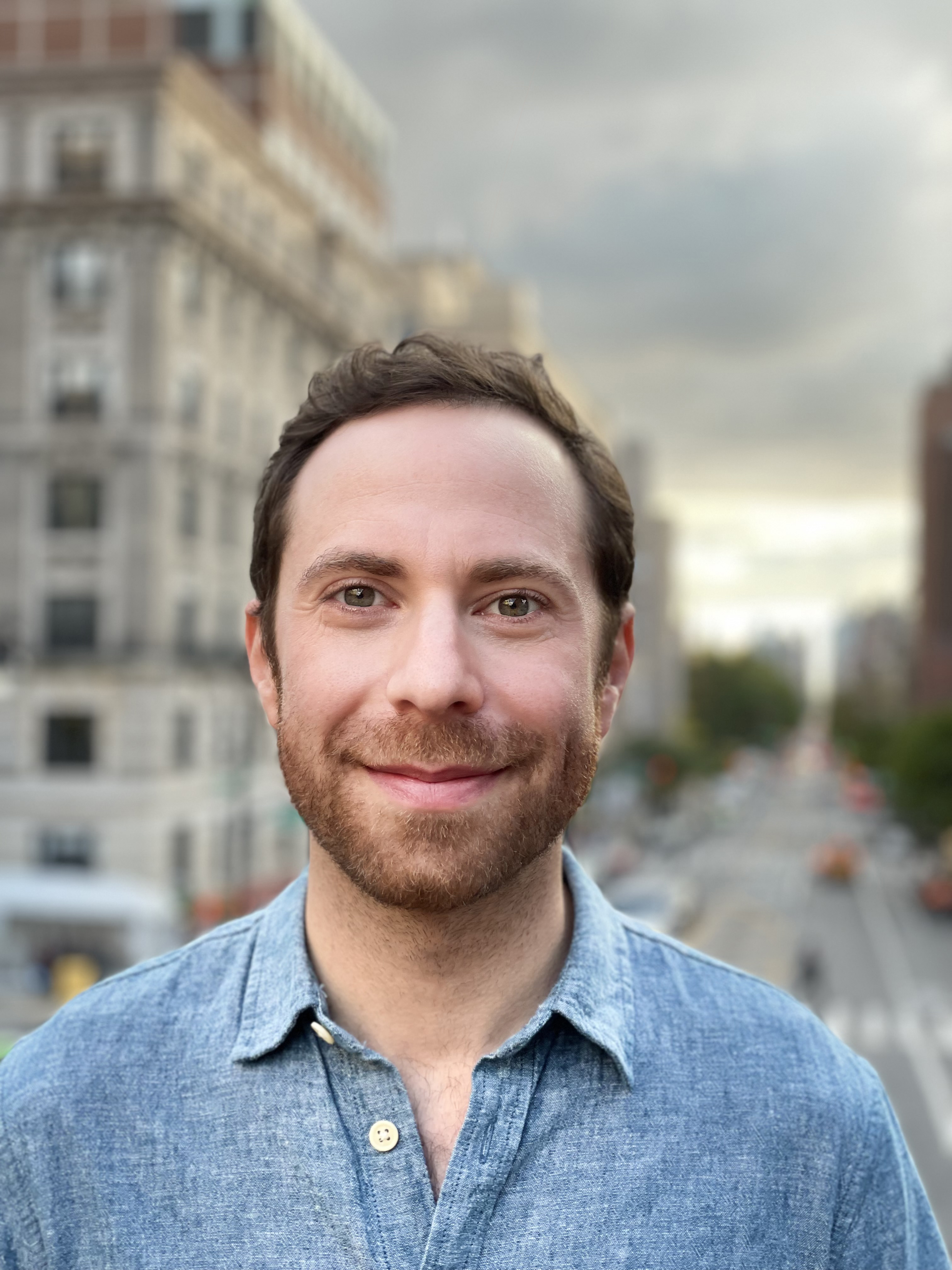
- Born: 2 April 1987 (age 39)
- Citizenship: United States
- Education: Syracuse University, Tufts University
- Occupations: Professor; author
- Relatives: David Slepian (grandfather); Jan Slepian (grandmother)
- Scientific career
- Doctoral advisor: Nalini Ambady

Michael Slepian (born April 2, 1987) is an American psychologist and author. He is currently an associate professor of business at Columbia University. Slepian is best known for his research on the psychology of secrecy. In 2022, he published a book titled The Secret Life of Secrets.

Slepian received the Rising Star Award from the Association for Psychological Science in 2016. He is on the editorial boards of the Journal of Experimental Social Psychology and Personality and Social Psychology Bulletin.

== Education and career ==
Slepian was educated at Syracuse University and received his M.S. and PhD from Tufts University.

== Research ==
Whereas prior psychology research on secrecy has focused on the experience of concealing secrets, Slepian's research has revealed that many of the harmful effects of secrets comes from people's tendency to think about and therefore be preoccupied by their secrets. Moreover, his research reveals that secrets can lead to feelings of shame, isolation, uncertainty, and inauthenticity. On the other hand, his research has found that confiding secrets in others is beneficial for health and well-being, as it generates emotional and practical support from others.
