= Familiarity heuristic =

Tendency to favor familiar things over new things

In psychology, a heuristic is an easy-to-compute procedure or rule of thumb that people use when forming beliefs, judgments or decisions. The familiarity heuristic was developed based on the discovery of the availability heuristic by psychologists Amos Tversky and Daniel Kahneman; it happens when the familiar is favored over novel places, people, or things. The familiarity heuristic can be applied to various situations that individuals experience in day-to-day life. When these situations appear similar to previous situations, especially if the individuals are experiencing a high cognitive load, they may regress to the state of mind in which they have felt or behaved before. This heuristic is useful in most situations and can be applied to many fields of knowledge; however, there are both positives and negatives to this heuristic as well.

== Origin ==
=== Availability heuristic ===
The familiarity heuristic stems from the availability heuristic, which was studied by Tversky and Kahneman. The availability heuristic suggests that the likelihood of events is estimated based on how many examples of such events come to mind. Thus the familiarity heuristic shows how "bias of availability is related to the ease of recall."

Tversky and Kahneman created an experiment in order to test this heuristic. They devised four lists of 39 names. Each list contained 19 female names and 20 male names. Half of the lists had famous female names, and the other half had famous male names. They showed the lists to two test groups. The first group was shown a list and asked to recall as many names as possible. The second group was shown a list and asked to determine if there were more female or more male names. The subjects who heard the list with famous female names said there were more female names than there were male names. Similarly, the subjects who heard the list with famous male names recalled more male names than female names. Thus the familiarity heuristic is defined as "judging events as more frequent or important because they are more familiar in memory."

The familiarity heuristic is based on using schemas or past actions as a scaffold for behavior in a new (yet familiar) situation. This is useful because it saves time for the subject who is trying to figure out the appropriate behavior for a situation they have experienced before. Individuals automatically assume that their previous behavior will yield the same results when a similar situation arises. This technique is typically useful. However, certain behaviors can be inappropriate when the situation is different from the time before.

=== Hindsight bias ===
The hindsight bias is the inclination to see events that have already occurred as being more predictable than they were before they took place. For example, after a situation occurs for the first time, you begin to notice it when it reoccurs and therefore because you have now experienced it, it's more readily available in your consciousness and you pull information and predict aspects of the future because of this and think that you "knew it all along." "Hindsight bias results from a biased reconstruction of the original memory trace, using the outcome as a cue" Hindsight bias can alter memories and therefore future predictions.

== Important research ==
Recent studies have used functional magnetic resonance imaging (fMRI) to demonstrate that people use different areas of the brain when reasoning about familiar and unfamiliar situations. This holds true over different kinds of reasoning problems. Familiar situations are processed in a system involving the frontal and temporal lobes whereas unfamiliar situations are processed in the frontal and parietal lobes. These two similar but dissociated processes provide a biological explanation for the differences between heuristic reasoning and formal logic.

=== Warm glow heuristic ===
Corneille, Monin & Pleyers (2004) showed that familiarity of human faces is based on attractiveness. In this study the researchers showed their subjects pictures of faces. The subjects were asked to rate how familiar the face was or was not using visual cues. The visual cues were choosing a picture of a butterfly (attractive) when the subject thought the face was familiar, and choosing a picture of a rat (unattractive) when the subject did not find the face familiar. The result of this study was that the subjects were more familiar when the face was attractive regardless of prior exposure to the picture (or person) itself. This has been referred to as the warm glow effect (Monin 2003). The warm glow effect states that positive stimuli seem more familiar because of the positive emotions they evoke in us.

== Applications ==
The familiarity heuristic increases the likelihood that customers will repeatedly buy products of the same brand. This concept is known as brand familiarity in consumer behavior. Due to the familiarity heuristic, the customers have the rule of thumb that their past behavior of buying this specific brand's product was most likely correct and should be repeated. A study examining the choice of various models of microwave ovens based on the subjects' familiarity with them showed that high familiarity with the features of microwave ovens allowed for a faster and more confident choice.

This effect can also have important implications for medical decision making. Lay people tend to make health decisions that are based on familiarity and availability as opposed to factual knowledge about diseases. This means that they are more likely to take actions and pursue treatment options that have worked in the past, whether they are effective in the current situation or not. This also extends to treatments the patient has not used before but is familiar with. For example, a lay person may request a name-brand medication because they have heard of it before, even though a generic drug may be essentially the same but less expensive. Medical professionals are much more likely to use scientific facts to prescribe treatments.

== Current criticisms ==
There is some criticism of the concept of familiarity heuristic. It mainly focuses on the point that past behavior does influence present behavior but that this inherits from other, and differing contrivances. One study examining multiple possible mechanisms of how previous behavior influences the present found little support for the familiarity heuristic and tends to conclude instead that the influence of past behavior on a present one decreased when subjects were distracted. However, in order for a heuristic to be valid, its effect should be more prevalent when individuals are distracted and their cognitive capacity is highly strained. This result indicates that it is unlikely that a familiarity heuristic was applied during the experiment.

Another limit of familiarity heuristic according to a study by Ouellette & Wood (1998) is that it might not always be applicable. This study showed that the familiarity heuristic might only occur in situations where the target behavior is habitual and occurs in a stable context within the situation. Thus, the familiarity heuristic could be limited to habits and behaviors in routine situations.

== See also ==
- Thin-slicing
