= Jon Freeman (academic) =

American psychologist

- Born: Jonathan B. Freeman
- Education: New York University; Tufts University
- Scientific career
- Workplaces: Columbia University; Dartmouth College; New York University
- Doctoral advisor: Nalini Ambady

Jonathan B. Freeman (born 1986) is an American psychologist and associate professor of psychology at Columbia University. He is best known for his work on the neuroscience of person perception and social cognition, as well as mouse-tracking methodology in cognitive science. His research focuses on the cognitive and neural mechanisms underlying split-second social judgments and their impact on behaviour.

== Early life and education ==
Freeman received his B.A. from New York University in 2007, where he first studied social psychology. He earned his Ph.D. at Tufts University in 2012, where he worked with Nalini Ambady.

== Research and career ==
After his doctorate, Freeman joined the faculty of Dartmouth College as an Assistant Professor. He moved to New York University as an Assistant Professor in 2014, was promoted to Associate Professor in 2018, and moved to Columbia University as an Associate Professor in 2022. He directs the Social Cognitive and Neural Sciences Lab. His research combines behavioural paradigms with computational modelling and human neuroimaging techniques such as functional magnetic resonance imaging.

Freeman investigates how we form social judgments and first impressions. In particular, his work has shown that, because facial cues are often complex and ambiguous, multiple “partial” perceptions must initially compete over fractions of a second. This dynamic competition is argued to be central to the ability to form social judgments. He proposed a theoretical framework known as the "dynamic interactive model" that posits flexible interplay between social cognition and visual perception, and his work has shown that stereotypes and other kinds of social or emotional knowledge can affect visual processing. An example is how stereotypes become expectations that impact visual prototypes and create distortions in how faces are perceived. His research has demonstrated that tacit assumptions about social groups, emotions, or personality can all influence the way we visually perceive and internally represent others' faces. These effects are thought to be driven by specific interactions between the fusiform face area, orbitofrontal cortex, and anterior temporal lobe.

Freeman studies several other topics in social neuroscience related to social cognition, emotion, and decision-making. For instance, he has examined mechanisms underlying the acquisition and reversal of unconscious bias, the brain's response to facial expressions or a person's trustworthiness outside conscious awareness, and the impact of split-second judgments on real-world outcomes.

Freeman developed MouseTracker, a software that tracks decision-making in the brain over hundreds of milliseconds by analysing the trajectory of a human subject's response-directed hand movement via a mouse cursor. It allows researchers to assess real-time processing in cognitive tasks. MouseTracker is used by over 3,000 researchers in several different disciplines. Freeman's work has helped establish and popularise the mouse-tracking technique in cognitive science.

Freeman is on the editorial board of Social Cognitive and Affective Neuroscience. He previously served as an Associate Editor of Personality and Social Psychology Bulletin.

=== Advocacy and academic service ===
Freeman wrote a commentary for Nature about how biases and non-supportive science, technology, engineering, and math (STEM) environments hinder the careers of LGBTQ people in STEM fields, and yet this group is often left out of diversity initiatives. He identified that LGBTQ people in STEM are less represented than statistically expected, reporting negative workplace experiences, and leaving STEM fields at a high rate. Realising the importance of comprehensive data, he led a collaborative effort with the support of 17 scientific organisations, including the American Association for the Advancement of Science, requesting the National Science Foundation to include sexual orientation and gender identity demographic questions in its U.S. STEM workforce surveys. LGBTQ data from these surveys is critical for researchers and policymakers to be able to understand and address potential disparities and disadvantages of LGBTQ people in U.S. STEM fields. For instance, data from these surveys is necessary for official documentation of underrepresented groups in STEM and potential allocation of federal resources. The National Science Foundation is currently piloting these questions for future surveys.

=== Awards ===
2019 LGBTQ Scientist of the Year, National Organization of Gay and Lesbian Scientists and Technical Professionals

2019 Association for Psychological Science Janet T. Spence Award for Transformative Early Career Contributions

2017 Society for Social Neuroscience Early Career Award

2017 National Science Foundation CAREER Award

2016 Innovation Award, Social and Affective Neuroscience Society

2016 Early Career Award, International Social Cognition Network

2016 SAGE Young Scholar Award, Foundation for Personality & Social Psychology

2015 Rising Star Award, Association for Psychological Science

2015 Forbes Magazine's 30 Under 30

2014 Pacific Standard Magazine's Top 30 Thinkers Under 30
