= Illusory correlation =

Inaccurately perceiving a relationship between two unrelated events

In psychology, illusory correlation is the phenomenon of perceiving a relationship between variables (typically people, events, or behaviors) even when no such relationship exists. A false association may be formed because rare or novel occurrences are more salient and therefore tend to capture one's attention. This phenomenon is one way stereotypes form and endure. Hamilton & Rose (1980) found that stereotypes can lead people to expect certain groups and traits to fit together, and then to overestimate the frequency of such co-occurrences. These stereotypes can be learned and perpetuated without any actual contact occurring between the holder of the stereotype and the group it is about.

== History ==
"Illusory correlation" was originally coined by Chapman (1967) to describe people's tendencies to overestimate relationships between two groups when distinctive and unusual information is presented. The concept was used to question claims about objective knowledge in clinical psychology through Chapmans' refutation of many clinicians' widely used Wheeler signs for homosexuality in Rorschach tests.

== Example ==
David Hamilton and Robert Gifford (1976) conducted a series of experiments that demonstrated how stereotypic beliefs regarding minorities could derive from illusory correlation processes. To test their hypothesis, Hamilton and Gifford had research participants read a series of sentences describing either desirable or undesirable behaviors, which were attributed to either Group A (the majority) or Group B (the minority). Abstract groups were used so that no previously established stereotypes would influence results. Most of the sentences were associated with Group A, and the remaining few were associated with Group B. The following table summarizes the information given.

Behaviors	Group A (majority)	Group B (minority)	Total
Desirable	18 (69%)	9 (69%)	27
Undesirable	8 (30%)	4 (30%)	12
Total	26	13	39

Each group had the same proportions of positive and negative behaviors, so there was no real association between behaviors and group membership. Results of the study show that positive, desirable behaviors were not seen as distinctive so people were accurate in their associations. On the other hand, when distinctive, undesirable behaviors were represented in the sentences, the participants overestimated how much the minority group exhibited the behaviors.

A parallel effect occurs when people judge whether two events, such as pain and bad weather, are correlated. They rely heavily on the relatively small number of cases where the two events occur together. People pay relatively little attention to the other kinds of observation (of no pain or good weather).

== Theories ==
=== General theory ===
Most explanations for illusory correlation involve psychological heuristics: information processing short-cuts that underlie many human judgments. One of these is availability: the ease with which an idea comes to mind. Availability is often used to estimate how likely an event is or how often it occurs. This can result in illusory correlation, because some pairings can come easily and vividly to mind even though they are not especially frequent.

=== Information processing ===
Martin Hilbert (2012) proposes an information processing mechanism that assumes a noisy conversion of objective observations into subjective judgments. The theory defines noise as the mixing of these observations during retrieval from memory. According to the model, underlying cognitions or subjective judgments are identical with noise or objective observations that can lead to overconfidence or what is known as conservatism bias—when asked about behavior participants underestimate the majority or larger group and overestimate the minority or smaller group. These results are illusory correlations.

=== Working-memory capacity ===
In an experimental study done by Eder, Fiedler and Hamm-Eder (2011), the effects of working-memory capacity on illusory correlations were investigated. They first looked at the individual differences in working memory, and then looked to see if that had any effect on the formation of illusory correlations. They found that individuals with higher working memory capacity viewed minority group members more positively than individuals with lower working memory capacity. In a second experiment, the authors looked into the effects of memory load in working memory on illusory correlations. They found that increased memory load in working memory led to an increase in the prevalence of illusory correlations. The experiment was designed to specifically test working memory and not substantial stimulus memory. This means that the development of illusory correlations was caused by deficiencies in central cognitive resources caused by the load in working memory, not selective recall.

=== Attention theory of learning ===
Attention theory of learning proposes that features of majority groups are learned first, and then features of minority groups. This results in an attempt to distinguish the minority group from the majority, leading to these differences being learned more quickly. The Attention theory also argues that, instead of forming one stereotype regarding the minority group, two stereotypes, one for the majority and one for the minority, are formed.

=== Effect of learning ===
A study was conducted to investigate whether increased learning would have any effect on illusory correlations. It was found that educating people about how illusory correlation occurs resulted in a decreased incidence of illusory correlations.

=== Age ===
Johnson and Jacobs (2003) performed an experiment to see how early in life individuals begin forming illusory correlations. Children in grades 2 and 5 were exposed to a typical illusory correlation paradigm to see if negative attributes were associated with the minority group. The authors found that both groups formed illusory correlations.

A study also found that children create illusory correlations. In their experiment, children in grades 1, 3, 5, and 7, and adults all looked at the same illusory correlation paradigm. The study found that children did create significant illusory correlations, but those correlations were weaker than the ones created by adults. In a second study, groups of shapes with different colors were used. The formation of illusory correlation persisted showing that social stimuli are not necessary for creating these correlations.

=== Explicit versus implicit attitudes ===
Two studies performed by Ratliff and Nosek examined whether or not explicit and implicit attitudes affected illusory correlations. In one study, Ratliff and Nosek had two groups: one a majority and the other a minority. They then had three groups of participants, all with readings about the two groups. One group of participants received overwhelming pro-majority readings, one was given pro-minority readings, and one received neutral readings. The groups that had pro-majority and pro-minority readings favored their respective pro groups both explicitly and implicitly. The group that had neutral readings favored the majority explicitly, but not implicitly. The second study was similar, but instead of readings, pictures of behaviors were shown, and the participants wrote a sentence describing the behavior they saw in the pictures presented. The findings of both studies supported the authors' argument that the differences found between the explicit and implicit attitudes is a result of the interpretation of the covariation and making judgments based on these interpretations (explicit) instead of just accounting for the covariation (implicit).

=== Paradigm structure ===
Berndsen et al. (1999) wanted to determine if the structure of testing for illusory correlations could lead to the formation of illusory correlations. The hypothesis was that identifying test variables as Group A and Group B might be causing the participants to look for differences between the groups, resulting in the creation of illusory correlations. An experiment was set up where one set of participants were told the groups were Group A and Group B, while another set of participants were given groups labeled as students who graduated in 1993 or 1994. This study found that illusory correlations were more likely to be created when the groups were Group A and B, as compared to students of the class of 1993 or the class of 1994.

== See also ==
- Apophenia
- Clustering illusion
- Cognitive bias
- Confirmation bias
- Cum hoc ergo propter hoc
- Observer bias
- Observer-expectancy effect
- Pareidolia
- Post hoc ergo propter hoc
- Radical behaviorism
- Subject-expectancy effect
- Superstition
- Thin-slicing
- Type I error
- Spurious relationship
