= Segal Design Institute =

Design thinking institute at Northwestern University

Coordinates: 42°3′28.2″N 87°40′33.1″W

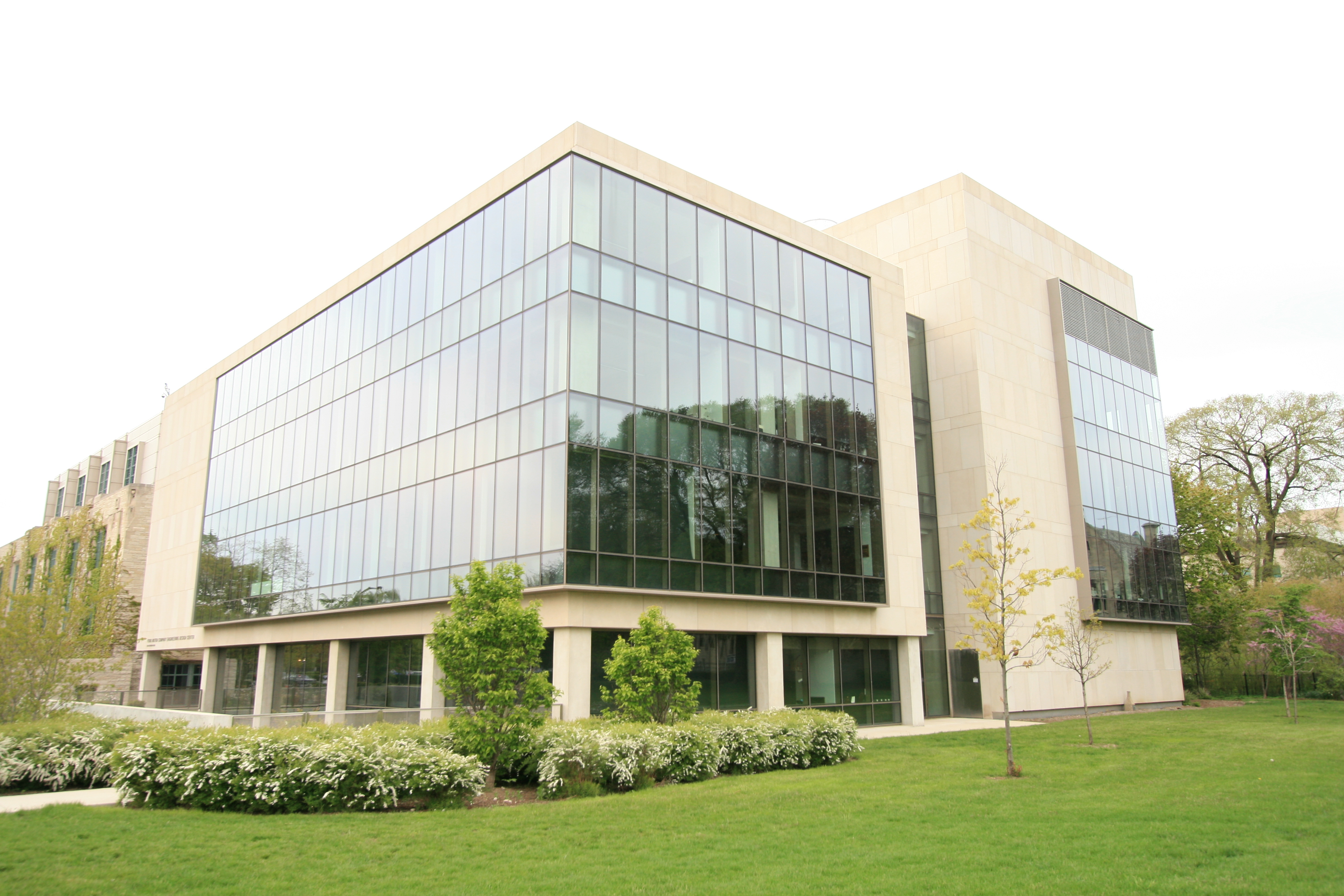
- Established: 2007; 19 years ago
- Field of research: Human-centered design, Design thinking, User-centered design, art, design
- Director: Greg Holderfield, Bruce Ankenman
- Location: Evanston, Illinois, United States
- Affiliations: Northwestern University
- Website: design.northwestern.edu

The Segal Design Institute is a design thinking institute at Northwestern University. Segal operates within the McCormick School of Engineering and Applied Science and is dedicated to the study of human-centered design at the undergraduate and graduate level.

== History ==
The Segal Design Institute was established in 2007 through a significant donation from Gordon and Carole Segal, co-founders of Crate & Barrel.

=== Academics ===
==== Undergraduate ====
===== MaDE =====
Segal administers an undergraduate degree program, Manufacturing and Design Engineering (MaDE), which teaches product and process design, manufacturing systems, and manufacturing management. The MaDE program culminates in a Bachelor of Science degree from Northwestern and is accredited by the Engineering Accreditation Commission of ABET.

===== Segal Design Certificate =====
Segal also administers the Segal Design Certificate, a set of courses that builds design knowledge and skills and is available to any undergraduate at Northwestern. In addition to completing required courses and approved electives, students must produce and present a design portfolio to receive the Segal Design Certificate.

==== Graduate ====
At the graduate level, Segal administers three Master's programs and an interdisciplinary doctoral cluster program for PhD students.

Segal administers the Engineering Design Innovation (EDI) program. EDI a 18-month, full-time graduate program that teaches design thinking, a process of user research, visualization, and rapid iteration to engineers. The Master of Science degree in EDI is conferred by the Northwestern University Graduate School.

Segal administers the MMM program, a dual-degree program. MMM graduates receive an MBA from the Kellogg School of Management and an M.S. in Design Innovation from the Segal Design Institute at the McCormick School of Engineering. The MMM program includes lectures, experiential courses and studio-based classes. In addition to required business and design innovation courses, students pursue advanced electives that serve their unique career interests. The MMM program was reframed in 2014. The current iteration of the MMM program incorporates a deeper focus on design innovation.

Segal administers Master of Product Design and Development Management (MPD^{2}) program. The program is intended for active professionals and has both full-time and part-time tracks. The MPD² program began in 2003.

The Segal Design Cluster is an interdisciplinary doctoral cluster program jointly sponsored by Segal, the McCormick School of Engineering, and The Graduate School at Northwestern. The Design Cluster brings together faculty from the Segal Research Faculty Council with PhD students from a variety of disciplines. Design Cluster fellowships are awarded to current Northwestern PhD students interested in research projects involving faculty advisers from at least two different schools.

==== Notable courses ====
Segal offers 70 courses including Design Research, Industrial Design, UX Design, Service Design, and Design Thinking and Communication (DTC).

DTC is a two quarter-long interdisciplinary course for all undergraduate students at Northwestern Engineering. The courses are typically taken in the first year. Students learn that both design and communication are iterative, context-centered, problem-solving processes. DTC is co-taught by an instructor from Northwestern Engineering and by an instructor from the Cook Family Writing Program at the Weinberg College of Arts and Sciences. In January 2016, The Wall Street Journal profiled DTC in an article titled "The Power of Unsolvable Problems." Students enrolled in DTC work on projects for real-world clients. The Chicago Tribune featured the design work of a DTC project in March 2013 and Fast Company featured the design of a DTC project in July 2016.

In 2016, Segal began offering a course called "Designing Your Life" for the first time. Inspired by a class by the same name at Stanford University and created with the support of Stanford Professors Dave Evans and Bill Burnett, the class teaches students to use design thinking to explore bigger life obstacles. The Northwestern version of the course emphasizes fieldwork and prototyping.

In 2017, the Segal Design Institute launched the Bay Area Immersion Program with the Medill School of Journalism at Northwestern. Based at the Northwestern educational space in downtown San Francisco, students learn from and contribute to the Bay Area's entrepreneurial culture while taking four courses that focus on experiential learning in design innovation, digital communication, and the intersection of technology and culture. ChicagoInno included the program in an article titled "Chicago Students Head West for Tech Culture Immersion" in February 2017.

Additionally, Segal houses Design for America, a national network on 40 campuses engaging over 1,200 students each year to use design innovation for positive social impact. Design for America was founded at Northwestern in 2009.

== Prominent faculty ==
- Bruce Ankenman, Associate Professor, Industrial Engineering and Management Sciences
- Achal Bassamboo, Professor of Managerial Economics & Decision Sciences, Operations at Kellogg School of Management and co-director of the MMM Program
- J. Edward Colgate, Professor, Mechanical Engineering, Breed Senior Professor in Design, and Director, Master of Science in Engineering Design Innovation program
- Elizabeth Gerber, Associate Professor, Mechanical Engineering, Breed Junior Professor of Design, and director of the Segal Design Cluster
- Greg Holderfield, Clinical Associate Professor, Mechanical Engineering, co-director of the Segal Design Institute and co-director of MMM Program
- Jim Wicks, Associate Professor, Clinical, Segal Design Institute
- Haoqi Zhang, Assistant Professor of Electrical Engineering and Computer Science and Junior Breed Professor of Design

== See also ==
- user-centered design
- design thinking
- human-centered design
