= Abbie Conant =

American trombonist

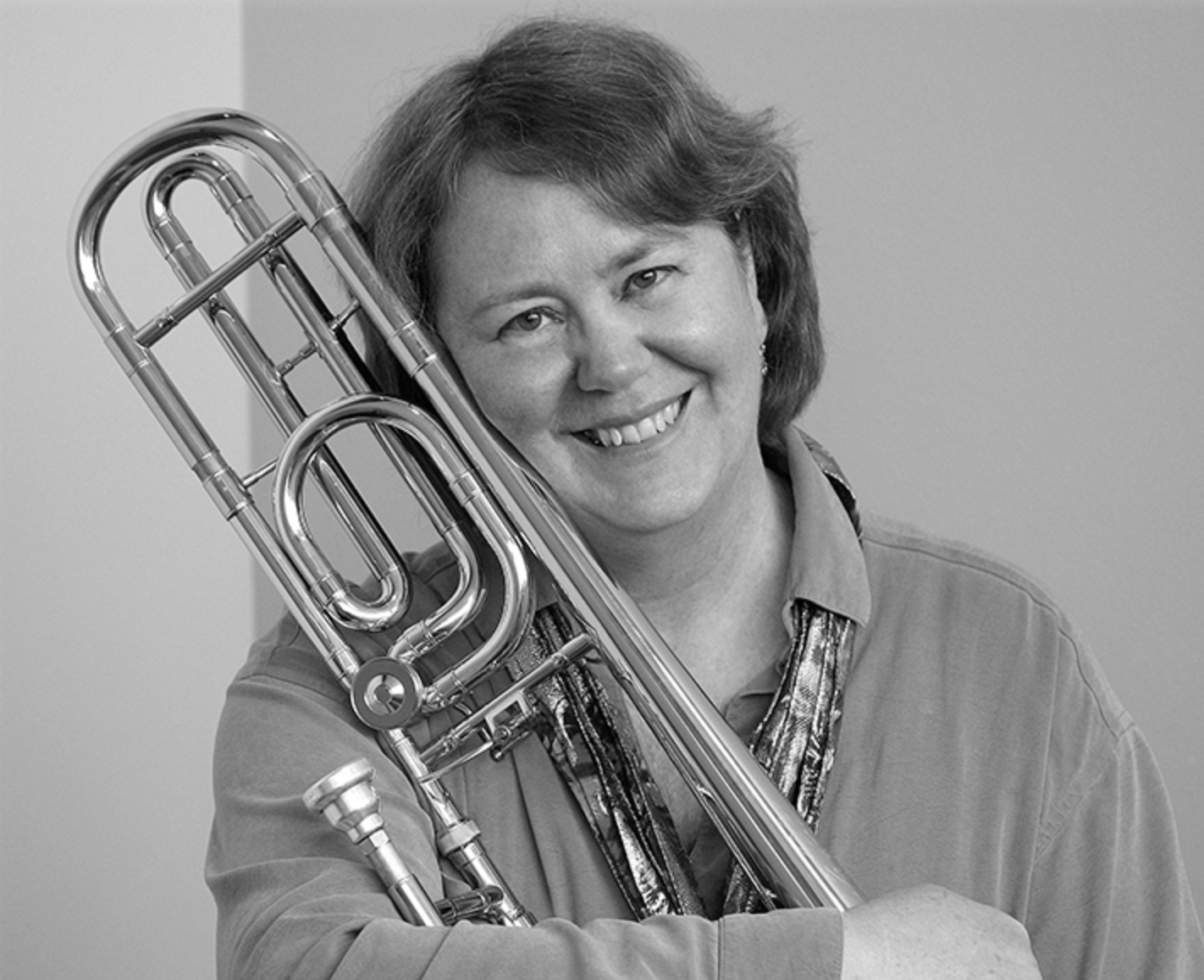

Background information
- Born: March 14, 1955 (age 71)
- Genre: Classical
- Occupations: Trombonist; educator; activist
- Instrument: Trombone
- Years active: 1980–present
- Website: osborne-conant.org

Abbie Conant is an American trombonist and former professor at the Staatliche Hochschule für Musik, Trossingen. She was selected in a blind audition as the overwhelming first choice for principal trombonist of the Munich Philharmonic Orchestra in 1980, but was subject to sexist discrimination once the selection committee learned they had chosen a woman.

== Early life and education ==
Conant was raised in New Mexico, and attended the University of New Mexico, Temple University and Juilliard. Her teachers included Per Brevig, Branimir Slokar, and Christian Lindberg.

Prior to college, Conant attended the Interlochen Arts Academy, where she earned a diploma in 1973. In 1972, Conant performed with an Interlochen ensemble at the Kennedy Center in Washington, D.C.; the program included Glinka's Overture to Ruslan and Ludmilla, Bartok's 2nd Piano Concerto, Barber's Symphony No. 1, Vaughan Williams' Fantasia on a Theme of Thomas Tallis and Stravinsky's Firebird Suite. Conant has drawn attention to the substantial rise in tuition fees needed to attend the Interlochen Arts Academy, which in 2024 stand at $76,500 a year for boarders compared to around $5000 in the late 1960s.

Additionally, Conant acquired an art diploma from the Hochschule für Musik und Tanz Köln, studying with Branimir Slokov. She went to Italy through the "Spoleto Festival Dei due Mondi". Here she studied contemporary music with Vinko Globokar at L'Accademia Chigiana in Siena. Thereafter she became the first trombonist in the orchestra of the Royal Opera, Turin.

Conant became a professor of trombone at the Staatliche Hochschule für Musik, Trossingen in 1992 and retired in February, 2023.

== Chamber music theatre (The Wasteland Company) ==
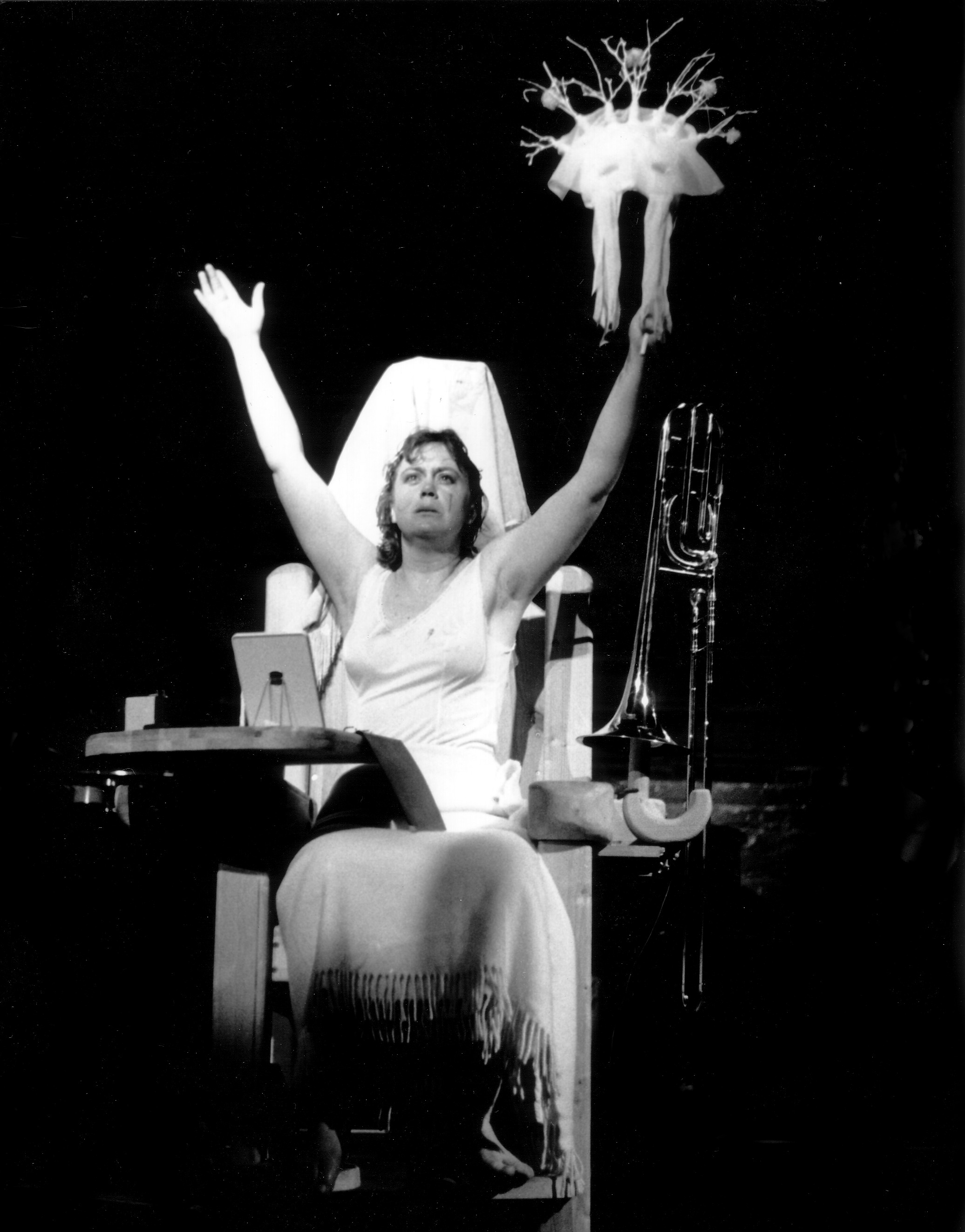
Photo from "Miriam". Conant describes: "Women confront... issues because society imposes roles upon them that limit their human potential. Miriam's domestic role forces her to wear "masks," but her buried authenticity fights back. Women in the workplace face similar pressures since they often confront attitudes and prejudice that limit their development."

Conant is married to the composer William Osborne, with whom she produces "chamber music-theatre" under the name The Wasteland Company. Some of these works involve feminist themes.

As an example, their work Miriam is a staged, theatrical work for trombone, soprano, spoken word, pantomime, and computer-controlled piano, which reacts to Conant's experience with the Munich Philharmonic. The company have produced 12 major works and published their scores openly on their website:

- Alice Through the Looking Glass, for chamber orchestra and singers (1983)
- Words and Music, for actor, baritone and piano (premiered Frankfurt 1985)
- Hamm, for acting violinist (premiered Munich 1982)
- Ohio Impromptu, for tenor, actor and piano (premiered Munich 1986)
- Lenore, for acting trombonist (premiered Munich 1983)
- Samuel Beckett's Act Without Words, for pantomiming instrumentalist and piano (premiered Staatstheater Ingolstadt 1986)
- Rockaby, for singing actress and tape of voice, four trombones and piano (premiered Staatstheater Kassel 1986)
- Winnie, for performance-artist-soprano, with optional instrumental part, and piano (premiered Rome 1984)
- Miriam, a three-part music theatre work for performance artist and piano
  - Part 1: The Mirror (premiered Stuttgart 1988)
  - Part 2: The Chair (premiered Gasteig Kultur Zentrum, Munich 1990)
  - Part 3: The River (premiered Munich 1990)
- Street Scene For the Last Mad Soprano, for soprano with computer generated quadraphonic tape (premiered K-9 Theatre, Constance, 1996)
- Cybeline, a multimedia music theater work for trombonist/performance artist (premiere REDCAT Theatre Disney Hall, Los Angeles, 2004)
- Aletheia, for singer/instrumentalist, computer controlled piano and quadraphonic electronics (premiere University of the Redlands, California, 2007)

== Munich Philharmonic ==
=== Audition ===
Conant's auditions were blind, with musicians and the selection committee separated by a screen. This was a novel practice at the time, and was due to the fact that one of the other 32 auditioning trombonists was the son of a prominent musician. Following Conant's audition on June 19, 1980, the orchestra's then guest conductor Sergiu Celibidache exclaimed "That's who we want!"

After they made their selection, the selection committee were shocked to discover their winner, whom they had mistakenly addressed in correspondence as "Herr Conant", was a woman. Celibidache continued to harass Conant, subtly and blatantly, and had since been promoted to music director. In September 1982, Celibidache demoted her to second trombone and refused to give her solos, explaining that "we need a man for solo trombone". The Munich Philharmonic stopped using blind auditions after Conant's success.

=== Legal trials ===
In 1982, Conant initiated legal proceedings against the City of Munich (the philharmonic's owner) for discrimination and regained the position of first trombone in 1984.

The first court hearing took place on 17 August 1982, initiated by City of Munich lawyers. Despite this, no ruling could be made as no "specific or concrete criticism" of Conant in concert was produced. The city lawyers also failed to provide the legally required written warnings. A new trial date was set for 16 June 1983, for which city lawyers provided the following basis for demotion:

The plaintiff does not possess the necessary physical strength to be a leader of the trombone section; she is not in the position to clearly lead the trombone group. Apart from that, she lacks the required empathy to translate the artistic wishes of the General Music Director

In response to this, Conant went for examinations at the Gautinger Lung Clinic. There, they tested how efficient how body was at absorbing oxygen, her lung capacity, and the speed of inhalation and exhalation. She had to disrobe and let a doctor examine her rib cage and chest in order to assess, in the judge's words,

whether the Plaintiff--for an orchestra of the quality of the Munich Philharmonic --possesses unconditionally the necessary physical strength, endurance, and durability to play the most difficult passages according to conductors’ instructions for length, intensity, and loudness.

Celibidache attended the second trial, but was not invited to give testimony due to lack of substantiated criticism. The court ruled in favour of Conant on 29 March 1984, citing:

“The suit is permissible because the change in work assignments, due to the lack of a substantiated argument, is unjustified.”

“The accused has not justified their demotion with facts, but rather generalized value judgments.”

“Above and beyond that, they do not say when (date) the alleged mistakes happened. They also do not mention when the plaintiff was given a warning.”

“It is therefore not possible for the court to determine what the plaintiff did wrong, or determinable whether she took the alleged warnings to heart, or in other words, whether the mistakes were made again after the warning.”

She then successfully sued the orchestra again for back pay when she discovered that, per Celibidache's orders, she had been paid less than her male colleagues.

Malcolm Gladwell said Conant's story was "my inspiration" for his bestseller, Blink, and it served as the book's concluding chapter. Her story was also told in a 1994 full-length documentary film, Abbie Conant: Alone Among Men by Brenda Parkerson.

== Taos studio ==
Conant and her husband Wiliam Osborne own a studio space in Taos, New Mexico. There is a two-bedroom living space and performance space capacity to seat 60. In addition to their own works, the studio has hosted readings, presentations and concerts from local Taoseña women and fellows of the Wurlitzer Foundation.

== See also ==
- Annemarie Roelofs
