= Jennifer Richeson =

American psychologist (born 1972)

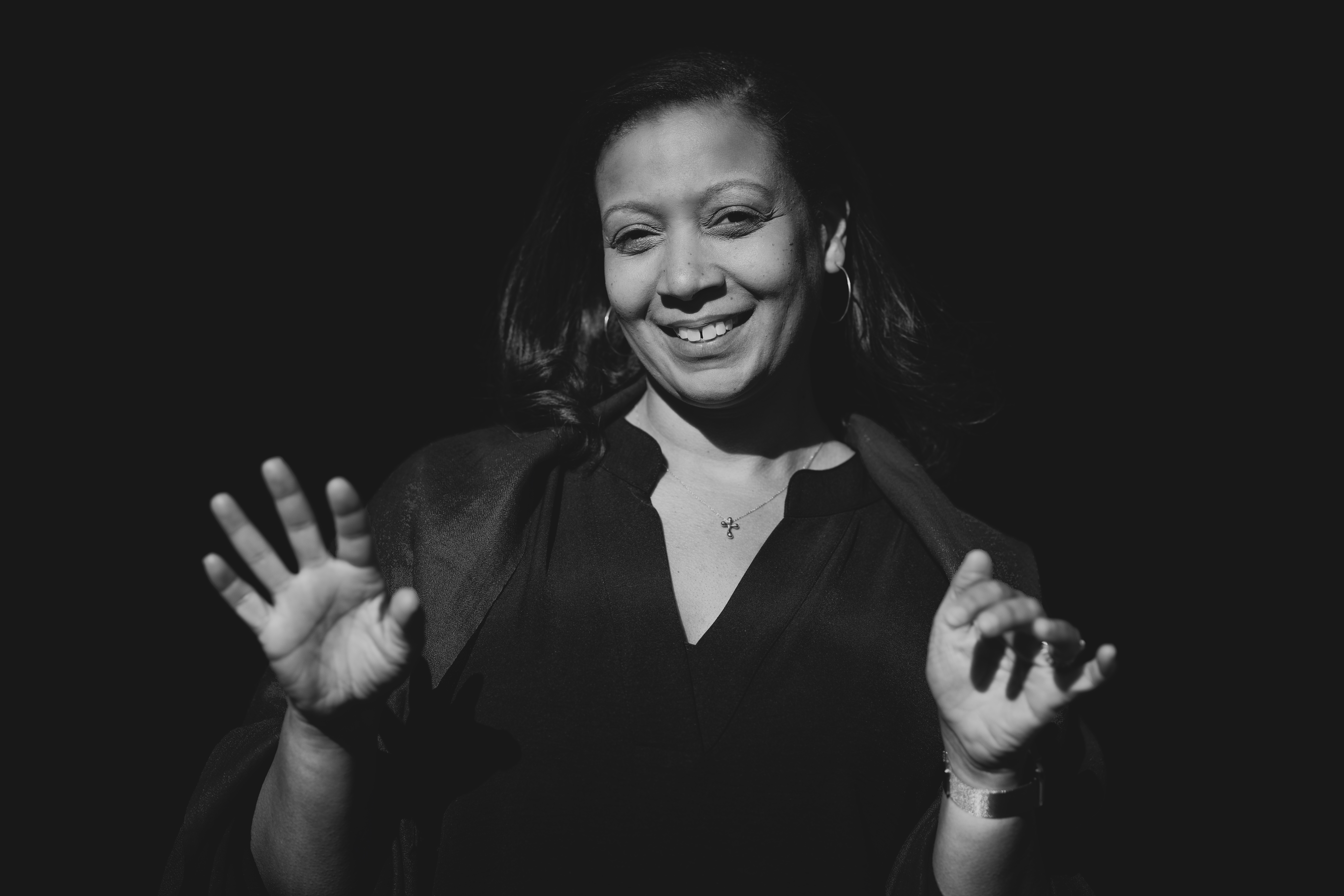
- Born: September 12, 1972 (age 53); Baltimore, Maryland, U.S
- Education: Brown University (BS); Harvard University (MA, PhD)
- Known for: prejudice; discrimination; cultural diversity; intergroup relations
- Awards: APA Distinguished Scientific Award for an Early Career Contribution to Psychology; MacArthur Fellowship; Guggenheim Fellow
- Scientific career
- Fields: Social psychology
- Institutions: Stanford University; Dartmouth College; Northwestern University; Yale University
- Doctoral advisor: Nalini Ambady

Jennifer A. Richeson (born September 12, 1972) is an American social psychologist who studies racial identity and interracial interactions. She is currently the Philip R. Allen Professor of Psychology at Yale University where she heads the Social Perception and Communication Lab. Prior to her appointment to the Yale faculty, Richeson was a Professor of Psychology and African-American studies at Northwestern University. In 2015, she was elected to the United States National Academy of Sciences. Richeson was elected to the American Philosophical Society in 2022. She was appointed in 2021 to the President’s Council of Advisors on Science and Technology (PCAST), where she served during the Biden administration.

== Early life ==
Richeson was raised in a predominantly white middle-class area of Baltimore, Maryland, the daughter of a businessman and a school principal. She has described herself as an indifferent and underachieving student in her childhood. Leaving the predominantly white elementary school and the shadow of her gifted older brother, David, Richeson blossomed after moving to schools with a more diverse student population. She entered a predominantly black middle school and all-female high school. Her realization that advanced classes were disproportionally taken by non-African-Americans motivated her to become a student activist. She has cited these early experiences as important in developing her interest in identity and interracial interactions.

== Education ==
Richeson completed a Sc.B. in psychology with honors at Brown University in 1994. She earned her M.A. and Ph.D. in social psychology at Harvard University in 1997 and 2000, respectively, under the mentorship of her doctoral adviser Nalini Ambady.

== Academic career ==
Richeson became an assistant professor in the Department of Psychological and Brain Sciences at Dartmouth College in Hanover, New Hampshire, in 2000. She was a visiting fellow at Stanford University's Research Institute for Comparative Studies in Race and Ethnicity. In 2005, she moved to Northwestern University in Evanston, Illinois, where she held appointments in the Department of Psychology and Department of African American Studies (by courtesy) and was a faculty fellow of the Institute for Policy Research and the Center on Social Disparities and Health. She was appointed as the John D. & Catherine T. MacArthur Foundation Endowed Chair between 2013 and 2016. She joined the faculty at Yale University in 2016, where she is the Philip R. Allen Professor of Psychology and Director of the Social Perception and Communication Lab. She is endeavoring in the translation of empirical research into the practical application of knowledge. For example, she is currently the faculty fellow of the Institution for Social and Policy Studies at Yale University and the affiliated external scholar of the Stone Center on Socioeconomic Inequality in the City University of New York. She also serves as an executive committee member on the Societal Experts Action Network, which is part of the National Academies of Sciences, Engineering, and Medicine.

Richeson also writes opinion pieces and commentaries on topics related to race. As a former fellow of the OpEd Project, she has written articles published in different newspapers or magazines, including The Hill, The Boston Globe, The Washington Post, Huffington Post, Foreign Affairs, Ebony, The American Prospect, and U.S. News & World Report. Recently The Atlantic published an essay of hers about the “enduring narrative” of the “mythology of racial progress” in the United States that she argues would distort to way we perceive reality. She is planning to develop the theme into a book-length manuscript.

== Professional honors ==
The American Psychological Association honored Richeson with the Distinguished Scientific Award for an Early Career Contribution to Psychology for her creativity and sophistication in examining the mechanisms of prejudice, discrimination, and intergroup relations using behavioral and neuroimaging methodologies. In 2006, Richeson was awarded a MacArthur Fellowship, also known as a "genius grant," for her work in "highlighting and analyzing major challenges facing all races in America and in the continuing role played by prejudice and stereotyping in our lives." In April 2015, she was named a Guggenheim Fellow. Later the same month, she was elected a member of the United States National Academy of Sciences, one of the only two new black members in 2015, according to The Journal of Blacks in Higher Education. She is also an elected fellow of the American Psychological Association, Association of Psychological Sciences, Society of Experimental Social Psychology, Society for Personality and Social Psychology, and American Academy of Arts and Sciences. She has received other awards for research accomplishments. In 2019, she got the Mamie Phipps Clark and Kenneth B. Clark Distinguished Lecture Award from Columbia University and the Career Trajectory Award from the Society of Experimental Social Psychology. She also received an honorary doctorate from her Alma mater, Brown University, in the same year. SAGE Publishing and the Center for Advanced Study in the Behavioral Sciences (CASBS) at Stanford University honored Richeson with the 2020 SAGE-CASBS Award in 2020. She received a Carnegie Foundation Senior Fellowship in the same year.

== Research ==
Richeson is recognized for her work examining the psychological phenomena of cultural diversity, social group memberships, dynamics of race and racism, and the course of interracial interactions. She and her research laboratory at Yale work on three broad themes related to cultural diversity, namely, the perception and reasoning about intergroup inequality, the navigation of diverse environments, and the experiences of discrimination.

=== Perception and reasoning about inequality ===
Richeson and her lab revealed the myth and narratives in society about racial progress as something that can be automatically and inevitably achieved. In examining the factors sustaining such narratives, they found that a belief in a just world and racially diverse social network was associated with the overestimation of economic and racial equality between Black and White individuals. Results from other endeavors of her lab suggested that the exposure to inequalities may motivate the support of policies in redressing inequalities in society.

Regarding how the individual responds to the information about inequalities, Richeson revealed two factors that shape our response, our beliefs about the nature of racism and the consciousness of the consequence of racism. She and her team found that individuals with a more structural understanding of racism were more likely to respond to the information about inequalities and support policies in reducing the inequalities. People engaged in discrimination that brought from implicit or unconscious belief, on the other hand, maybe deemed less accountable for their own actions.

=== Navigation of diverse environments ===
In the prevailing notion about the states marching towards a “majority-minority” nation, Richeson and the lab have explored the anticipated threat that may bring to the current status of White individuals. Richeson's more recent work on the effects of demographics on political attitudes – in which studies of politically independent white Americans revealed increasingly conservative political attitudes with increasing awareness of declining white population share – has been widely reported in the media as significant for the future of American national politics.

Richeson's research makes use of neuroimaging methodologies in examining the dynamics of interracial interactions. Her work in this area has been described as sophisticated and as moving past descriptive uses of imaging to test real hypotheses. Several of her most influential papers describe fMRI-based findings related to increased cognitive control exerted during interracial interactions by white people whose implicit association test results indicate racial bias. Although self-regulatory effort in avoiding the expression of prejudice is cognitively demanding, it is found effective in creating a positive environment for interracial interactions.

=== Experiences of discrimination ===
Richeson and her lab built on this premise that taking a third-person or distanced point of view when encountering stressors can effectively reduce its negative effects on mental and physical health. They suggesting a redemption narrative that can enable individuals to alleviate the negative impact of discrimination.

Richeson also examined the experience of group-based discrimination and its impact on the relations with members of other stigmatized groups. It is found that the salience of discrimination would bring more positive relations with groups within the same dimension of identity (e.g., among racial minorities), yet it would also bring about negative attitudes with groups in a different dimension of identity (e.g., racial versus sexual minorities). Richeson and her lab discovered ways to bridge the cross-identity dimensions by recognizing the similarities of the discrimination encountered by different stigmatized groups. She believed that it could be helpful in promoting the stigma-based solidarity, and in turn, reducing the negative attitudes among stigmatized groups.
