= Chip Heath =

American academic

- Born: July 19, 1963 (age 63)
- Education: Texas A&M University; Stanford University
- Occupation: Academic
- Employer: Stanford Graduate School of Business
- Relatives: Dan Heath (brother)

Chip Heath (born July 19, 1963) is an American academic. He is the Thrive Foundation for Youth Professor of Organizational Behavior at the Stanford Graduate School of Business, and the co-author of several books.

== Early life ==
Heath graduated from Texas A&M University, where he earned a Bachelor of Science degree in industrial engineering. He subsequently earned a PhD in psychology from Stanford University.

== Career ==
Heath taught at the University of Chicago Graduate School of Business and the Fuqua School of Business at Duke University. Heath is a professor of organizational behavior at the Stanford Graduate School of Business. He has taught courses on organizational behavior, negotiation, international strategy, and social entrepreneurship.

With his brother Dan, Heath has co-authored four bestselling books, Made to Stick: Why Some Ideas Survive and Others Die (2007), Switch: How to Change Things When Change Is Hard (2010), Decisive: How to Make Better Choices in Life and Work (2013), and The Power of Moments: Why Certain Experiences Have Extraordinary Impact (2017). He also helped James G. March write the business book A Primer on Decision Making: How Decisions Happen (1994).

Made to Stick was named "Best Business Book of the Year", was on the BusinessWeek bestseller list for 24 months, and has been translated into at least 25 languages. This book was co-written with his brother, Dan Heath.

'Switch' stayed in the New York Times Best Seller List for 47 weeks.
