= Blind audition =

Type of audition

In a blind audition, the identity of the performer is concealed from the judges to prevent bias. The performance takes place behind a curtain so the judges cannot see the performer. Blind auditions have become a standard in symphony orchestras.

In the 1970s, jazz bassist and clinical psychologist Art Davis unsuccessfully filed suit against the New York Philharmonic for racial discrimination. Although his suit failed, his efforts have been credited for helping pave the way to the current system of blind auditions for orchestras.

In 1980, American trombonist Abbie Conant was selected in a blind audition as the overwhelming first choice for principal trombonist of the Munich Philharmonic Orchestra but was subsequently subjected to sexism by the director Sergiu Celibidache. His discriminatory behavior came to light during a 12-year legal battle throughout his tenure at the Munich Philharmonic. On his orders, she was forced to sit in the second chair and was paid less than her male colleagues because of her gender. Celibidache was not invited to give testimony at the trials due to a lack of substantiated criticism. The courts found in favor of Conant as Celibidache "could not justify his complaint with facts". An appeal on the decision failed, and Conant was paid the same as her male colleagues.

According to a widely cited 2001 study by Cecilia Rouse of Princeton and Claudia Goldin of Harvard, the introduction of blind auditions to American symphony orchestras increased the probability that a woman would advance from preliminary rounds by 50 percent. Among those symphonies, "about 10 percent of orchestra members were female around 1970, compared to about 35 percent in the mid-1990s." Rouse and Goldin attribute about 30 percent of this gain to the advent of blind auditions, although they admit that their "estimates have large standard errors and at least one persistent effect in the opposite direction."

In 2010, the competitive talent show The Voice of Holland introduced blind auditions to televised talent shows; the format was then quickly franchised to dozens of other countries.

Similarly, blind judging and blind jury represent the same premise of an item or person being judged solely on its own merits.

== See also ==
- Blind interview
- Blinded experiment
- Affirmative action
