= Thin-slicing =

Term used in psychology and philosophy

Thin-slicing is a term used in psychology and philosophy to describe the ability to find patterns in events based only on "thin slices", or narrow windows, of experience. The term refers to the process of making very quick inferences about the state, characteristics or details of an individual or situation with minimal amounts of information. Research has found that brief judgments based on thin-slicing are similar to those judgments based on much more information. Judgments based on thin-slicing can be as accurate, or even more so, than judgments based on much more information.

The first recorded use of the term was in 1992 by Nalini Ambady and Robert Rosenthal in a meta-analysis in the Psychological Bulletin. Since then, thin-slicing has been applied to many domains, and has been used to make various types of judgments. A non-exhaustive list of domains includes interpersonal relationship, clinical studies, and education.

== Overview ==
Thin slices of the behavioral stream contain important diagnostic and predictive social psychological information. Because thin-slice perception and judgment is sufficiently effective, people's interpersonal perceptions can occur immediately, automatically, and to some extent validly before much can be communicated verbally or through actions and events. Given the limited conditions under which social inference and correction occur, these initial judgments may determine people's ultimate perceptions, evaluations, and theories about those with whom they interact face-to-face.

Many studies have shown that brief observations can be used to assess outcomes at levels higher than expected by chance. Once comparing these observations of less than five minutes to those greater than five minutes, the data show no significant change, thus implying that observations made within the first few minutes are unchanging. An example of this can be seen in an Ambady and Rosenthal experiment in 1993, in which they assessed the effect of thin slicing with 2-, 5-, and 10-second clips of non-verbal behaviors of teachers and the viewers' ratings of those teachers afterwards. Impressions formed after viewing thin slices of behavior are considered accurate if they match impressions formed after a more detailed observation of the subject and if they match the impressions formed by other raters. While people are often not able to report the factors that influence their judgments, researchers identify types of information in brief slices of behavior that are responsible for accurate judgments. Types of information include visual and verbal information. More specifically, researchers look at how people make judgments based on their observations of others' minor traits such as eye contact, fidgeting, open-handed gestures, stiff posture, smiling, etc. Behaviors such as frowning, fidgeting, and gazing down had poor ratings for traits describing the teacher's confidence, warmth and optimism while teachers with positive ratings for these traits smiled more, were more likely to walk around and touch their upper torsos.

Ambady and Rosenthal ultimately found that those who rated the teachers after being subjected to thin slicing produced ratings that were very similar to those who rated the teachers after having substantial interactions with them. Additionally, the accuracy of these ratings was not significantly different among those who saw the 2-, 5- and 10-second clips. This demonstrates the impressive amount of information that is conveyed in thin slices of everyday behavior and the insight that it can provide about an individual's personality, no matter how briefly the behavior is observed.

== Domains ==
People would expect that thin slices of themselves only reveal socially valued characteristics. Otherwise, they would be more willing to reveal minor imperfections about themselves before others make inferences based on their observations. Nonetheless, both desirable and undesirable characteristics are usually visible through the peephole of thin slices. Thin slices of individuals' behaviors could expose characteristics of their personality, internal states, sexuality, relationship, biases, etc. Even individuals' future behaviors could be predicted with reasonable accuracy through thin slicing.

=== Interpersonal relationships ===
==== First impression ====
In the research paper published in 2007 by Dana R. Carney et al., it was discovered that increased exposure time, i.e. length of the slice, helped people to obtain more information, so that they could better judge social approach and positive affect. The same increased length of the slice was less related to judging threats and negative affect. The accuracy of the judgement based on a five-second long slice is significantly lower than the accuracy of judgments based on longer exposures. Also, slices extracted from the later stage of the interaction potentially allowed people to make more accurate judgments. Dana R. Carney et al. also drew the conclusion that women tended to make more accurate judgments using thin slicing than did men.

==== Speed dating ====
Marian L. Houser et al. built on Deyo & Deyo's earlier work and studied thin slicing in speed dating. They found out that a few moments of communication evaluation in speed dating indeed helped the participants to predict outcomes and make speculated assessments of their relationship with the potential mate. Female speed daters noted male negative characteristics rather quickly, and were generally more critical. This could mean that males were more open-minded or at least slower to identify the negative characteristics, meaning that they were less reactive in comparison to females when doing thin slicing. While both sexes were equally good in making positive evaluations about their partners, females made more specific descriptions than males, and males might engage in observing the superficial if they only noticed negative characteristics in the beginning of the date. Still, the overall result showed that speed dating did make the participants look more favorable in each other's eyes.

==== Social media profiles ====
Thin-slicing is a phenomenon that can occur virtually as well through contact with an individual's online profile. Online profiles are essentially made up of several different condensed sections that reveal different aspects of a person's life and interests. Microsoft researchers Kristin Stecher and Scott Counts investigated this domain of thin-slicing to determine exactly how much information was needed on the online profiles for viewers to form an accurate impression of the individual and which profile fields contribute most to the ability to form that impression. They focused on two forms of social media domains: general social networking sites such as Facebook and Friendster, and blogging sites. The predictiveness of an attribute was defined as its ability to contribute to a viewer's ability to form a predictive impression of the subject. For social media sites, information such as the individual's photo, name, status, high school and gender allowed raters to form predictive impressions while for blogging sites, this predictive information included the individual's photo, religious views, current town, employer and number of groups. Thus, while users can use thin slices of information gathered from these online profiles to form an impression of the subject, the impression is severely impacted by the type of attributes that are presented on the profile as well as the different ways they are processed based on user goals.

==== Sexual orientation ====
In 1999, Nalini Ambady et al. studied the accuracy of judgments of sexual orientation from thin slices of behavior. After taking variables such as the gender and sexual orientation of the judges and the gender of the targets into consideration, Ambady reached the conclusion that people could accurately perceive sexual orientation through thin slicing. Approximately 55% of the judgments based on still photo slices were accurate, and approximately 70% of the judgments based on 10 second silent video slices were accurate. Such perception and judgment would be more accurate if the materials provided were of dynamic nonverbal nature (e.g.: silent videos containing much gestural information) rather than of static information nature (e.g.: still photographs). Also in her studies, gay men and lesbians were generally more accurate than heterosexuals in making judgments.

=== Clinical ===
==== Cognitive ability ====
An individual's mood has been known to distort cognitive abilities. Emotions cloud rational quick thoughts. The three most influential studies were conducted in 2002 by Nalini Ambady and Heather M. Gray. In the first study, induced sadness led to reduced accuracy in judgments of teacher effectiveness from brief samples of nonverbal behavior. In the second study, sad participants showed reduced accuracy in judging relationship type from thin-slices as well as diminished judgmental efficiency. The third study showed the possibility that sadness impairs accuracy by promoting a more deliberative information-processing style. All of these studies have the basic principle that emotions do in fact affect judgement as seen through effects on thin-slicing. They disprove conclusions from some previous studies that sadness would lead to more cautious processing strategy or would not have a strong effect in social perception, and argue that short-term induced sadness would hinder individual's social interpretation skills.

==== Personality disorder ====
Jacqueline N.W. Friedman et al. (2007) examined people's ability to detect personality disorder using a thin-slicing approach. They found that people were capable of detecting pathological personality traits in 30 seconds of videotaped behavior. By looking at the "thin slices" of videos, research participants were able to accurately identify targets with personality pathology from the video. Also, when participants were exposed to an increased number of personality traits, i.e.: increasing spectrum instead of "thickness" of the slices, they performed better at identifying targets' negative traits. This correlation between "thin slices" with richer content and participants' better performance in detecting personality disorder is found to be stronger than correlations found in other studies using thin slice methodology.

==== Deception detection ====
Albrechsten, Meissner and Susa (2009) of the University of Texas at El Paso conducted two separate studies of processing style (intuitive vs. deliberative processing) in a deception detection task. In the first experiment, a thin-slicing manipulation was used to show that intuitive processing can lead to more accurate judgments of deception when compared with traditional forms of processing, i.e.: forms that take in much more information input. In the second experiment, participants who engaged in a second task performed more accurately in a deception task than participants who were asked to provide a verbal rationale for each decision. The results converged to suggest that intuitive processing can significantly improve deception detection performances.

=== Educational ===
==== Parenting ====
One of the first series conducted by James Bugental and his colleagues showed that parents' expectancies, identified from brief clips of their tone, are related to their children's behavior process. The tone of a mother with a normal child and one whose child has behavioral problems differed significantly. A quick observation of parents of normal children and parents of children with behavioral problem can easily help the observer to distinguish the two types. The conceptions above provide an underlying basis that there actually is an ability to judge from brief observations. Research in classrooms has shown that judges can distinguish biased teachers and their expectations for students from unbiased teachers and their expectations simply from brief clips of teachers' behaviors. Likewise, research in the courtroom has shown that in brief excerpts of judges' instructions to jurors in trials, raters could predict the judge's expectations for the trial.

=== Examples in everyday life ===
Some people believe that the effects of the phenomenon known as déjà vu happen within the same time frame of thin-slicing and might also have a direct correlation. A narrow window of experience is enough for an individual to feel sure that they have already witnessed or experienced a current situation, even though the exact circumstances of the prior encounter are uncertain and were perhaps imagined.

Many other uses of thin-slicing are implied by media reports such as firemen making split-second decisions, or cops knowing something is wrong by simply a gut feeling. All these suggest anecdotally that thin-slicing occurs regularly.

== Explanations regarding thin-slicing accuracy ==
There are several proposed explanations regarding the accuracy of judgments made from thin slices of behavior.

The first explanation draws from psychologists Zebrowitz-McArthur and Baron's ecological approach to Social perception, which states that attributes corresponding to an unpleasant or threatening presence can be easily and quickly recognized because the ability to sense danger is essential for survival and adaptive action. Thus, traits such as anger and dominance are generally more easily identifiable compared to humor or responsibility.

The second explanation involves the role that stereotypes play in the initial stages of forming a judgment about someone. Preliminary opinions generated via thin-slicing are often influenced by the stereotypes a person holds, and these stereotypes often hold a certain, small amount of truth. For example, Berry and McArthur found that adults with baby faces are generally perceived to be more honest, naive and kind. There is also evidence that physical and biological differences are linked with differences in temperament. Shyer and more reserved adult men tend to have more lightly colored eyes and a leaner, more delicate build compared to men who are more social and dominant. However, stereotypes may not always be as accurate as they seem because they can be propagated by a cycle of self-fulfilling prophecies in which our behavior is dictated by the expectations we hold of someone based on the stereotypes they fit to. This in turn causes the target individual to modify their own behavior to confirm those expectations and gives the illusion that the person's traits accurately fits the stereotype from the beginning. For example, physically attractive individuals may become more socially-skilled and confident simply because they internalize the beliefs held by others that they are more socially desirable and outgoing.

The third explanation proposes that thin-slicing provides accurate judgments simply because they are snap judgments. Being exposed to only a thin-slice of behavior eliminates the presence of distracting stimuli such as verbal interaction and doesn't allow the rater time to introspectively reason out why they judge an individual a certain way, which may cause them to overthink and change the judgments formed by their initial instincts. Thin-slicing allows raters to focus on expressive behavior and weeds out extraneous information that can cause judgments to stray away from the truth.

None of these explanations are believed to universally encompass the true reason of why thin-slicing is successful. Instead, it is likely that they are not mutually exclusive and each influence thin-slicing accuracy to a certain degree.

== Variation in thin-slicing factors ==
=== Exposure time ===
Ambady and Rosenthal's 1992 meta-analysis revealed that a longer exposure time of a thin-slice does not significantly improve accuracy of judgment.

=== Channels of communication ===
Thin-slices of behavior include two main channels of communication: non-verbal and verbal. Non-verbal behavior is defined as facial and body expressions or tone of voice. Verbal behavior involves actual speech. When dealing with verbal and nonverbal cues that provide inconsistent conclusions, assessing the nonverbal behaviors generally provides the more accurate judgment. This is because humans can easily control what they say to present themselves in a particular light or provide a certain impression of a situation but have a more difficult time trying to control their facial and body expression and tone of voice. For example, judges were found to reveal their true expectations of whether or not a defendant was guilty through their nonverbal behavior but not their verbal behavior. However, Ambady and Rosenthal's meta-analysis revealed that while judgments were more accurate when observing only facial and body expressions as opposed to facial and body expressions in addition to speech, the difference in accuracy is not significant enough to actually declare that using different channels of communication will affect the accuracy of a result.

=== Physical attractiveness ===
In Ambady and Rosenthal's 1993 experiment, they use 2, 5 and 10 second video clips of non-verbal behavior of teachers to test the accuracy of the judgments made by raters who watched those videos. While physical attractiveness of the video subject may seem like an obvious bias that may lead people to form inaccurate judgments, they demonstrated that it actually did not have a strong effect on their experimental outcome. One reason may be due to differences in the "type" of thin slice that is being made available to the raters. For example, when simply given a photo of an individual, a rater tends to judge personality traits simply based on attractiveness. However, when expressive behavior is available such as through the video clips used in the experiment, physical attractiveness becomes less important and less utilized when forming an impression of someone.

== Practical implications ==
While thin-slicing has been proven to be a powerful experimental tool, it is important that experiments are being designed such that thin-slicing can actually be used to accurately judge the behavior of interest because it is not appropriate to use thin-slicing to universally evaluate different situations. First, the behaviors or traits in question should be easily observable so that ratings based on thin-slicing can be used reliably. Second, these traits should generally have an affective or interpersonally, rather than personally-oriented component because the latter is much more difficult to judge and less observable. Interpersonal dimensions include dominance and shyness while personal dimensions include conscientiousness and intelligence.

The proven accuracy and effects of thin-slicing has several practical implications. First, experimenters can reliably use thin-slicing to evaluate different affect variables and can thus save time and money on gathering extraneous information. Additionally, since thin-slicing can be used to accurately predict interpersonally-oriented qualities, they can be used in the selection, training and evaluation of individuals who require strong interpersonal skills, such as teachers, managers and therapists. Finally, since channels of communication do not significantly influence accuracy, ratings can be gathered from any of the channels that are conveniently available.

== Popular culture ==
=== Blink ===
One of the most popular books on thin-slicing is Blink: The Power of Thinking Without Thinking by Canadian journalist Malcolm Gladwell. In this book, the author describes interesting examples and research which exploit the idea of thin-slicing.

For example, Gladwell describes how a museum acquired an ancient sculpture, brought to the J. Paul Getty Museum in California, under the name Getty kouros. Some art experts observed the sculpture and decided there was something wrong with it, a gut feeling due to the artwork exhibiting all the wrong signs. However, under thorough investigation the sculpture was deemed real because of a lack of solid evidence to the contrary. The statue's authenticity was later thrown into question due to erroneous assumptions made by one of the researchers who had previously vouched for it.

Another example in this book explored the work of John Gottman, a well-known marital expert. Gladwell describes how within an hour of observing a couple, Gottman can gather with 95% accuracy if the couple will be together within 15 years. Gottman's accuracy goes down to 90% if he observes the couples for 15 minutes, supporting the phenomenon of thin-slicing. However, the strength of the evidence supporting these claims has been criticized.

=== 12 Angry Men ===
The drama has a few adaptations, including the earliest 1954 teleplay, a 1957 movie and a 1997 remake movie. The movies themselves did not explicitly discuss thin-slicing, but depicted various types of group behaviors and group interactions. Those depictions made the movie a popular choice for teaching and illustrating group processes.

There are now numerous websites containing essays and articles that analyze aspects of group dynamics shown in the movie, using methods analogous to thin-slicing. Also, students learning group dynamics, social psychology and related topics are usually required to analyze the movie using the thin-slicing method. All these analyses strongly correlate the movie to the method of thin-slicing.

== See also ==
- Familiarity heuristic
- First impression
- Illusory correlation
- Intertrial priming
- Priming
- Stereotype threat
- Zero-acquaintance personality judgments
