= Liking gap =

Psychological measurement

In social psychology, the liking gap is the disparity between how much a person believes that another person likes them and that other person's actual opinion. Studies have found that most people underestimate how much other people like them and enjoy their company.

== Research ==
The 2018 Psychological Science study which coined the term "liking gap" explored people's interactions in various scenarios: strangers meeting for the first time in a laboratory setting, members of the general public getting to know each other during a personal development workshop, and first-year college students living with a dormmate for one academic year. In all three scenarios, participants consistently self-assessed as less liked by the other person than they actually were. The gap was shown to be present in short, medium, and long conversations among strangers. In the laboratory setting, participants reporting both high and average shyness liked their discussion partner significantly more than they assessed their partner to like them. In students, the liking gap persisted nearly the entire duration of the study before suddenly closing at the end – possibly indicating that dormmates had directly discussed interpersonal compatibility to decide whether they should share a dorm the next year. The study found that participants gave each other social signals indicating liking but that these signals were neglected.

There is evidence that suggests the liking gap begins to develop from the age of 5, as this is around the time when children begin to become more aware of and concerned with the ways that they are evaluated by others.

Research suggests that people usually have favorable views about themselves and others. However, there is evidence that people tend to exhibit self-criticism when thinking about their own interactions with others.

== See also ==
- Spotlight effect
- Illusion of transparency
