= Blink: The Power of Thinking Without Thinking =

2005 book by Malcolm Gladwell

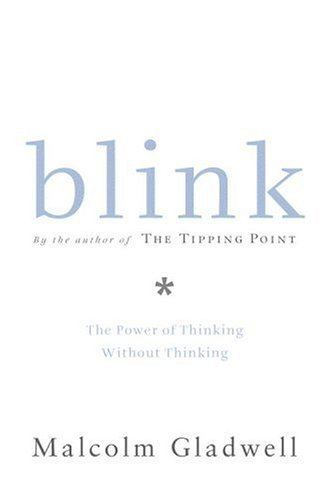
- Paperback edition
- Author: Malcolm Gladwell
- Language: English
- Subject: Psychology, popular psychology
- Genre: Non-fiction
- Publisher: Back Bay Books, Little, Brown
- Publication date: January 11, 2005
- Publication place: United States
- Media type: Print, e-book, audiobook
- Pages: 320 p. (paperback edition)
- ISBN: 0-316-17232-4
- OCLC: 55679231
- Dewey Decimal: 153.4/4 22
- LC Class: BF448 .G53 2005
- Preceded by: The Tipping Point, 2000
- Followed by: Outliers, 2008

Blink: The Power of Thinking Without Thinking (2005) is Canadian writer Malcolm Gladwell's second book. It presents in popular science format research from psychology and behavioral economics on the adaptive unconscious: mental processes that work rapidly and automatically from relatively little information. It considers both the strengths of the adaptive unconscious, for instance in expert judgment, and its pitfalls, such as prejudice and stereotypes.

== Summary ==
The author describes the main subject of his book as "thin-slicing": our ability to use limited information from a very narrow period of experience to come to a conclusion. This idea suggests that spontaneous decisions are often as good as—or even better than—carefully planned and considered ones. To reinforce his ideas, Gladwell draws from a wide range of examples from science and medicine (including malpractice suits), sales and advertising, gambling, speed dating (and predicting divorce), tennis, military war games, and movies and popular music. Gladwell also uses many examples of regular people's experiences with "thin-slicing," including our instinctive ability to read minds, which is how we can get to know a person's emotions just by looking at his or her face.

Gladwell explains how an expert's ability to "thin slice" can be corrupted by their likes and dislikes, prejudices, and stereotypes (even unconscious ones). A particular form of unconscious bias Gladwell discusses is psychological priming. He also discusses the implicit-association test, designed to measure the strength of a person's subconscious associations/bias.

Gladwell also mentions that sometimes having too much information can interfere with the accuracy of a judgment, or a doctor's diagnosis. In what Gladwell contends is an age of information overload, he finds that experts often make better decisions with snap judgments than they do with volumes of analysis. This is commonly called "analysis paralysis." The challenge is to sift through and focus on only the most critical information. The other information may be irrelevant and confusing. Collecting more information, in most cases, may reinforce our judgment but does not help make it more accurate. Gladwell explains that better judgments can be executed from simplicity and frugality of information. If the big picture is clear enough to decide, then decide from this without using a magnifying glass.

The book argues that intuitive judgment is developed by experience, training, and knowledge. For example, Gladwell claims that prejudice can operate at an intuitive unconscious level, even in individuals whose conscious attitudes are not prejudiced. One example is the halo effect, where a person having a salient positive quality is thought to be superior in other, unrelated respects. The example used in the book is Warren G. Harding. Henry Daugherty was impressed by Harding's appearance of respectability, and helped him become president of the United States of America, though Harding did nothing extraordinary for his political career.

Gladwell uses the 1999 killing of Amadou Diallo, where four New York policemen shot an innocent man on his doorstep 19 times, as another example of how rapid, intuitive judgment can have disastrous effects.

== Research and examples ==
The book begins with the story of the Getty kouros, which was a statue brought to the J. Paul Getty Museum in California. It was thought by many experts to be legitimate, but when others first looked at it, their initial responses were skeptical. For example, George Despinis, head of the Acropolis Museum in Athens, said "Anyone who has ever seen a sculpture coming out of the ground could tell that that thing has never been in the ground". Gradually, the argument for the legitimacy of the kouros' provenance fell apart. The letters tracing its history turned out to be fakes, referencing postal codes and bank accounts that did not exist until after the letters were supposedly written. However, experts to this day are unsure whether the kouros is authentic or not. The museum notes that "anomalies of the Getty kouros may be due more to our limited knowledge of Greek sculpture in this period rather than to mistakes on the part of a forger."

John Gottman is a researcher on marital relationships whose work is explored in Blink. After analyzing a normal conversation between a husband and wife for an hour, Gottman can predict whether that couple will be married in 15 years with 95% accuracy. If he analyzes them for 15 minutes, his accuracy is around 90%. But if he analyses them for only three minutes, he can still predict with high accuracy who will get divorced and who will make it. This is one example of when "thin slicing" works.

The studies of Paul Ekman, a psychologist who created the Facial Action Coding System (FACS), indicates that a lot of "thin slicing" can be done within seconds by unconsciously analyzing a person's fleeting look called a microexpression. Ekman claims that the face is a rich source of what is going on inside our mind and although many facial expressions can be made voluntarily, our faces are also dictated by an involuntary system that automatically expresses our emotions. One example of how movements of the face result in emotions is shown in an experiment from Paul Ekman, Wallace V. Friesen and Robert Levenson. They asked their test subjects to remember negative or burdening experiences. Another group was asked only to make faces that resembled negative feelings like anger, sadness and the like. Both groups were connected to sensors which measured their physiological reactions (pulse and body temperature). Interestingly the latter group showed the same physical reactions as the first group.

In a study done by Fritz Strack and his colleagues, students had to watch a movie. One group did so with a pen between their teeth while the other group had to hold the pen with their lips. The first group interpreted the movie funnier than the second, because the muscles responsible for smiling were used and then made the brain release hormones related to being happy. These studies show that facial expressions are not only the result of emotions but can also be their cause.

The book finishes with the case of sexism suffered by Abbie Conant, when she was the trombone soloist of the Munich Philharmonic, and its director, Sergiu Celibidache, relegated her to minor positions, made her receive a lower wage than her male colleagues and looked down on her from 1980 to 1993, when she finally left the orchestra. Gladwell said Conant's story was "my inspiration" for the book.

== Reception ==
Richard Posner, a professor at the University of Chicago and a judge on the United States Court of Appeals for the Seventh Circuit, argues that in Blink, Gladwell fails to follow his own recommendations regarding thin-slicing, and makes a variety of unsupported assumptions and mistakes in his characterizations of the evidence for his thesis. The Daily Telegraph review writes, "Rarely have such bold claims been advanced on the basis of such flimsy evidence."

In Think!: Why Crucial Decisions Can't Be Made in the Blink of an Eye (Simon and Schuster, 2006), Michael LeGault argues that "Blinklike" judgments are not a substitute for critical thinking. He criticizes Gladwell for propagating unscientific notions:

As naturopathic medicine taps into a deep mystical yearning to be healed by nature, Blink exploits popular new-age beliefs about the power of the subconscious, intuition, even the paranormal. Blink devotes a significant number of pages to the so-called theory of mind reading. While allowing that mind reading can "sometimes" go wrong, the book enthusiastically celebrates the apparent success of the practice, despite hosts of scientific tests showing that claims of clairvoyance rarely beat the odds of random chance guessing.

Nobel prize winner Daniel Kahneman, author of Thinking, Fast and Slow which speaks to rationality's advantages over intuition, says:

Malcolm Gladwell does not believe that intuition is magic. He really doesn't... But here his story has helped people, in a belief that they want to have, which is that intuition works magically; and that belief, is false.

In an article titled "Understanding Unconscious Intelligence and Intuition: Blink and Beyond", Lois Isenman agrees with Gladwell that the unconscious mind has a surprising knack for 'thinking without thinking' but argues that its ability to integrate many pieces of information simultaneously provides a much more inclusive explanation than thin-slicing. She writes:

Gladwell often speaks of the importance of holism to unconscious intelligence, meaning that it considers the situation as a whole. At the same time, he stresses that unconscious intelligence relies on finding simple underlying patterns. However, only when a situation is overwhelmingly determined by one or a few interacting factors is holism consistent with simple underlying signatures. In many situations, holism and simple underlying signatures pull in different directions.

== Topics mentioned ==
- Aeron chair produced by Herman Miller
- Amadou Bailo Diallo
- Cook County Hospital
- Getty kouros
- Keith Johnstone's book Impro: Improvisation and the Theatre
- Kenna
- Millennium Challenge 2002 and Paul K. Van Riper
- Pepsi Challenge and New Coke
- All in the Family
- The Mary Tyler Moore Show
- The Goldman Algorithm
- Abbie Conant

== See also ==
- Gavin de Becker
- Paul Ekman
- John Gottman
- Interpersonal perception
