= Think (book) =

2006 book by Michael R. LeGault

Think!: Why Crucial Decisions Can't Be Made in the Blink of an Eye
- Hardcover edition
- Author: Michael R. LeGault
- Language: English
- Subject: Business
- Publisher: Threshold Editions
- Publication date: January 3, 2006
- Publication place: United States
- Pages: 368 pp.
- ISBN: 978-1416523789

Think!: Why Crucial Decisions Can't Be Made in the Blink of an Eye is a non-fiction book by editor and journalist Michael R. LeGault, released in January 2006. It was published under Threshold Editions, a conservative publishing imprint under Simon & Schuster run by Mary Matalin.

Think claims to refute Blink, the best-selling 2005 book by Canadian journalist Malcolm Gladwell. It argues that United States and the West are in decline because of an intellectual crisis. Think contends that blink-like snap judgments are the cause of major failures such as the Hurricane Katrina response. LeGault maintains that relying on emotion and instinct instead of reason and facts is ultimately a threat to our freedom and way of life.

== Summary ==
Think begins as a critique of the decline of critical thinking in America. LeGault briefly mentions Blink as the height of this irrationality, but moves on to other failures in government, schools, media, and industry.

LeGault offers several examples of irrationality and mediocrity throughout the book:

- Poor decision-making at General Motors and the decline of the American auto industry.
- The politically correct reaction to remarks by Lawrence Summers, regarding gender differences.
- The failures of affirmative action to close the achievement gap.
- Sensationalist journalism, and the decline of newspaper readership.
- Over-emphasis on stress relief in marketing and media.
- The banning of DDT by the Environmental Protection Agency, in reaction to the book Silent Spring.
- The rise of relativism, as described by Allan Bloom in his book, Closing of the American Mind.

Much of the book deals with examples of failures or anomalies in American achievements. LeGault often attributes these shortcomings to a growing attitude or influential group. On page 93, he describes the problem of overmedicating children with Attention Deficit Disorder and Attention-deficit hyperactivity disorder:

The fact that the vast majority of children diagnosed with ADD and ADHD are boys naturally raises the suspicion that the trend is part of a larger feminist agenda. ... From this perspective Ritalin, it would appear, is being used to treat nothing more than a 'boy' gene, not a true medical condition".

In view of LeGault's description of the problem, he closes the book by offering solutions. Specifically, he calls for higher standards, especially among parents and schools.

== Reception ==
The book received praise for its analysis and refutation of the points brought up by Gladwell. However, LeGault has been criticized as a dealer of conspiracy theories as the book occasionally attributes the problems in American society to specific groups.
