= First impression (psychology) =

Mental image of a person from a first encounter

In psychology, a first impression is the event when one person first encounters another person and forms a mental image of that person. Impression accuracy varies depending on the observer and the target (person, object, scene, etc.) being observed. First impressions are based on a wide range of characteristics: age, race, culture, language, gender, physical appearance, accent, posture, voice, number of people present, economic status, and time allowed to process. The first impressions individuals give to others could greatly influence how they are treated and viewed in many contexts of everyday life.

== Speed and accuracy ==
It takes just one-tenth of a second for people to judge someone and make a first impression. Research finds that the more time participants are afforded to form the impression, the more confidence in impressions they report. Not only are people quick to form first impressions, they are also fairly accurate when the target presents themself genuinely. People are generally not good at perceiving feigned emotions or detecting lies upon a first encounter. Research participants who reported forming accurate impressions of specific targets did tend to have more accurate perceptions of specific targets that aligned with others' reports of the target. Individuals are also fairly reliable at understanding the first impression that they will project to others. However, people are not as good at understanding how well other people like them, and most people tend to underestimate how much other people like them. This phenomenon is called the liking gap.

The rate at which different qualities are detected in first impressions may be linked to what has been important to survival from an evolutionary perspective. For example, trustworthiness and attractiveness were the two traits most quickly detected and evaluated in a study of human faces. People are fairly good at assessing personality traits of others in general, but there appears to be a difference in first impression judgments between older and younger adults. Older adults judged young adult target photos as healthier, more trustworthy, and less hostile, but more aggressive, than younger adults did of the same photos. Older adults could have a lower response to negative cues due to a slower processing speed, causing them to see facial features on young adults as more positive than younger adults do.

== Number of observers ==
One's first impressions are affected by whether they're alone or with any number of people. Joint experiences are more globally processed (see global precedence for more on processing), as in collectivist cultures. Global processing emphasizes first impressions more because the collective first impression tends to remain stable over time. Solo experiences tend to facilitate local processing, causing the viewer to take a more critical look at the target. Thus, individuals are more likely to have negative first impressions than groups of two or more viewers of the same target. At the same time, individuals are more likely to experience an upward trend over the course of a series of impressions, e.g. individual viewers will like the final episode of a TV season more than the first even if it is really the same quality.

When viewing pieces of art in an experiment, participants in a solo context rated art in an improving sequence significantly higher than when the targets are presented in a declining sequence. When viewing the art in a joint context, participants evaluated the first and last pieces similarly in both kinds of sequence. Simply priming viewers to feel like they were in solo or joint contexts or to process analytically or holistically was enough to produce the same viewing effects.

== Cultural influences ==
=== Individualism versus collectivism ===
Similar to the number of viewers present, collectivism versus individualism can influence impression formation. Collectivists are at ease as long as their impressions are largely in alignment with the larger group's impressions. When a collectivist wants to change their impression, they may be compelled to change the views of all group members. However, this could be challenging for collectivists, who tend to be less confrontational than individualists. Individualists are willing to change their own views at will and are generally more comfortable with uncertainty, which makes them naturally more willing to change their impressions.

=== Influence of media richness ===
There is no research regarding if national culture mediates the relationship between media richness and bias in impression formation. Some studies that manipulated media richness have found that information presented in text form yields similar impressions (measured by reported appraisal scores) among cultures, while other studies found that richer forms of information such as videos reduce cross-cultural bias more effectively. The latter findings support Media Richness Theory.

=== Accents and speech ===
Accents and unique speech patterns can influence how people are perceived by those to whom they are speaking. For example, when hypothetically interviewing an applicant with a Midwestern U.S. accent, Colombian accent, or French accent, Midwestern U.S. participants evaluated the U.S. accent as significantly more positive than the applicant with the French accent due to perceived similarity to themselves. The evaluation of the applicant with the Colombian accent did not, however, differ significantly from the other two. First impressions can be heavily influenced by a similarity-attraction hypothesis where others are immediately put into "similar" or "dissimilar" categories from the viewer and judged accordingly.

=== Physical characteristics and personality ===
Although populations from different cultures can be quick to view others as dissimilar, there are several first impression characteristics that are universal across cultures. When comparing trait impressions of faces among U.S. and the culturally isolated Tsimane' people of Bolivia, there was between-culture agreement when ascribing certain physical features to descriptive traits such as attractiveness, intelligence, health, and warmth. Both cultures also show a strong attractiveness halo when forming impressions, meaning that those seen as attractive were also rated as more competent, sociable, intelligent, and healthy.

== Physical appearance ==
=== Faces and features ===
Physical appearance gives clear clues as to a person's personality without them ever having to speak or move. Women tend to be better than men at judging nonverbal behavior. After viewing pictures of people in a neutral position and in a self-chosen posed position, observers were accurate at judging the target's levels of extraversion, emotional stability, openness, self-esteem, and religiosity. The combined impression of physical characteristics, body posture, facial expression, and clothing choices lets observers form accurate images of a target's personality, so long as the person observed is presenting themselves genuinely. However, there is some conflicting data in this field. Other evidence suggests that people sometimes rely too much on appearance cues over actual information. When provided with descriptive information about a target, participants still rely on physical appearance cues when making judgments about others' personalities and capabilities. Participants struggle to look past physical appearance cues even when they know information contrary to their initial judgment. Physical cues are also used to make judgments about political candidates based on extremely brief exposures to their pictures. Perceived competence level of a candidate measured from first impressions of facial features can directly predict voting results.

The "beautiful is good" effect is a very present phenomenon when dealing with first impressions of others. Targets who are attractive are rated more positively and as possessing more unique characteristics than those who are unattractive. Beauty is also found to be somewhat subjective so that even targets who are not universally attractive can receive the benefit of this effect if the observer is attracted to them.

In a 2014 study, a group at the University of York reported that people's impressions of the traits of approachability, youthfulness/attractiveness and dominance correlated with facial measurements such as mouth shape and eye size.

=== Apparel and cosmetics ===
Cosmetic use is also an important cue for forming impressions, particularly of women. Those wearing heavy makeup are seen as significantly more feminine than those wearing moderate makeup or no makeup and those wearing heavy or moderate makeup are seen as more attractive than those wearing no makeup. While a woman wearing no makeup is perceived as being more moral than the other two conditions, there is no difference between experimental conditions when judging personality or personal temperament.

First impression formation can be influenced by the use of cognitive short hands such as stereotypes and representative heuristics. When asked to rate the socioeconomic status (SES) and degree of interest in friendship with African American and Caucasian female models wearing either a K-Mart, Abercrombie & Fitch, or non-logoed sweatshirt, Caucasian models were rated more favorably than the African American models. Abercrombie & Fitch wearers were rated as higher SES than the other sweatshirts. Participants wanted to be friends with the Caucasian model most when she was wearing a plain sweatshirt and the African American model most when she was wearing either the plain or K-Mart sweatshirt. It is unclear why the plain sweatshirt was most associated with friendship, but the general results suggest that mismatching class and race reduced the model's friendship appeal.

== Specific contexts ==
=== Online ===
Online profiles and communication channels such as email provide fewer cues than in-person interactions, which makes targets more difficult to understand. When research participants were asked to evaluate a person's facial attractiveness and perceived ambition based on an online dating profile, amount of time permitted for processing and reporting an evaluation of the target produced a difference in impression formation. Spontaneous evaluations relied on physical attractiveness almost exclusively, whereas deliberate evaluations weighed both types of information. Although deliberate evaluations used the information provided on both physical attractiveness and ambition of each target, the particular impact of each kind of information appeared to depend on the consistency between the two. A significant effect of attractiveness on deliberate evaluations was found only when perceived ambition was consistent with the perceived level of attractiveness. The consistency found in profiles seemed to particularly influence deliberate evaluations.

In a study of online impressions, participants who were socially expressive and disclosed a lot about themselves both on their webpages and in person were better liked than those who were less open. Social expressivity includes liveliness in voice, smiling, etc.

=== Dating and sexuality ===
Upon seeing photographs of straight, gay, and bisexual people, participants correctly identified gay versus straight males and females at above-chance levels based solely on seeing a picture of their face, however, bisexual targets were only identified at chance. The findings suggest a straight-non straight dichotomy in the categorization of sexual orientation.

The more time participants are allowed to make some judgment about a person, the more they will weigh information beyond physical appearance. Specific manipulations include identifying men as gay versus straight and people as trustworthy or not. In a study of the interaction between ratings of people in speed dating and the form of media used to present them, impression accuracy in a speed dating task was not significantly different when a potential date was presented in person versus in a video. However, impressions of dates made via video were to be much more negative than those made in person. An additional study that looked at characterization of a romantic partner suggested that people are more likely to rely on "gut reactions" when meeting in person, but there isn't sufficient information for this kind of evaluation when viewing someone online.

=== Professional ===
Non-verbal behaviors are particularly important to forming first impressions when meeting a business acquaintance. Specifically, components of social expressivity, such as smiling, eyebrow position, emotional expression, and eye contact are emphasized. Straightening one's posture, leaning in slightly, and giving a firm handshake promotes favorable impression formation in the American business context. Other impression management tactics in the business world include researching the organization and interviewers beforehand, preparing specific questions for the interviewer, showing confidence, and dressing appropriately.

A qualitative review of previous literature looking at self-report data suggests that men and women use impression management tactics in the corporate world that are consistent with stereotypical gender roles when presenting themselves to others. This research proposes that women are put in a double bind where those who portray themselves as more communal and submissive are overlooked for leadership positions and women who try to utilize male tactics (such as being more aggressive) receive negative consequences for violating normative gender roles. To change this dynamic the authors suggest that managerial positions should be re-advertised to highlight the feminine qualities needed for a position and staff training should involve a segment accentuating gender issues in the office to make everyone aware of possible discrimination.

Data collected from interviews with physicians distinguishes between first impressions and intuition and contributes to understanding the occurrence of gut feelings in the medical field. Gut feelings go beyond first impressions: Physicians expressed feeling doubtful about their initial impressions as they gathered more data from their patients. More experienced physicians reported more instances of gut feelings than those less experienced, but the quality of the intuition was related to the quality of feedback received during the data collection process in general. Emotional engagement enhanced learning just as it does in first impressions.

== Neuroscience ==
First impressions are formed within milliseconds of seeing a target. When intentionally forming a first impression, encoding relies on the dorsomedial prefrontal cortex (dmPFC). Readings from fMRIs of research participants show that processing of diagnostic information (e.g. distinguishing features) engaged the dmPFC more than processing neutral information.

Participants generally formed more negative impressions of the faces that showed a negative emotion compared to neutral faces. Results suggest that the dmPFC and amygdala together play a large role in negative impression formation. When forming immediate impressions based on emotion, the stimulus can bypass the neo-cortex by way of the "amygdala hijack."

=== Familiarity ===
Research indicates that people are efficient evaluators when forming impressions based on existing biases. The posterior cingulate cortex (PCC), amygdala, and the thalamus sort relevant versus irrelevant information according to these biases. The dmPFC is also involved in the impression formation process, especially with person-descriptive information.

FMRI results show activation of the fusiform cortex, posterior cingulate gyrus, and amygdala when individuals are asked to identify previously seen faces that were encoded as either "friends" or "foes." Additionally, the caudate and anterior cingulate cortex are more activated when looking at faces of "foes" versus "friends." This research suggests that quick first impressions of hostility or support from unknown people can lead to long-term effects on memory that will later be associated with that person.

=== Alcohol and impressions ===
Alcohol consumption and belief of consumption influenced emotion detection in ten second clips. Participants who thought they had consumed an alcoholic beverage rated one facial expression (approximately 3% of the facial expressions they saw) more in each clip as happy compared to the control group. Thus, impression formation may be affected by even the perception of alcohol consumption.

=== Cross-cultural differences ===
There appears to be cross-cultural similarities in brain responses to first impression formations. In a mock election both American and Japanese individuals voted for the candidate that elicited a stronger response in their bilateral amygdala than those who did not, regardless of the candidate's culture. Individuals also showed a stronger response to cultural outgroup faces than cultural ingroup faces because the amygdala is presumably more sensitive to novel stimuli. However, this finding was unrelated to actual voting decisions.

== Stability ==
Once formed, first impressions tend to be stable. A review of the literature on the accuracy and impact of first impressions on rater-based assessments found that raters' first impressions are highly correlated with later scores, but it is unclear exactly why. One study tested stability by asking participants to form impressions people based purely on photographs. Participants' opinions of the people in photographs did not significantly differ after interacting with that person a month later. One potential reason for this stability is that one's first impressions could serve as a guide for their next steps, such as what questions are asked and how raters go about scoring. More research needs to be done on the stability of first impressions to fully understand how first impressions guide subsequent treatment, self-fulfilling prophecies, and the halo effect. Assessment tools can influence impressions too, for example if a question provides only a dichotomous "yes" or "no" response or if a rater uses a scale (ratio). Although this study was conducted with the intention of improving rating methods in medical education, the literature review was sufficiently broad enough to generalize.

A study published in 2023 found that while first impressions based on attractiveness are formed quickly and can lead to stereotypical attributions, these impressions are malleable and can change when new information is presented, such as learning a photo was altered. This phenomenon, termed the "halo-update effect," suggests that our initial assessments of someone's personality based on their attractiveness can be revised with updated information.

== See also ==
- Impression formation
- Thin-slicing
- Samskara (Indian philosophy)
- Saṅkhāra
