= Reclassification (education) =

Changing high school graduation year

In education in the United States, reclassification or reclassing is the assignment of a student's high school (secondary school) graduation class to either a year earlier or later than their original. For young athletes, graduating a year earlier frees them to start their college sports career, with the hope of playing professionally sooner. On the other hand, an athlete repeating a grade and delaying graduation is allowed an extra year to mature. In most cases, a student who reclassified to graduate earlier also previously repeated a grade.

== Graduating later ==
Athletes may reclassify to a later year, repeating a grade in high school or middle school to gain an extra year to grow taller and stronger while developing academically and athletically. In some cases, children can be as young as 11 and in elementary school when they are held back. The goal for parents is to increase their child's chances to receive a college education that is funded by a generous athletic scholarship from an elite college sports program, which could lead to a lucrative career in pro sports. Even a slight increase in grade point average can result in improved college recruiting opportunities.

The NCAA requires that most of its course requirements be completed in the first four years of high school.

College coaches are generally ambivalent if a player reclassified to a lower grade, and numerous high school coaches are also supportive of the decision. The National Collegiate Athletic Association (NCAA) requires incoming students to have taken 16 core courses, with 10 completed by their seventh semester in high school. In 2007, in response to diploma mills, the NCAA required that 15 of those 16 courses be completed in the first four years of high school.

The practice of reclassifying dates back to at least 2000, including sports such as ice hockey, baseball, and lacrosse. In his 2008 bestseller Outliers, author Malcolm Gladwell examines relative age effect and the success of older kids in youth hockey. Most sports coaches believe that voluntarily repeating the eighth grade provides an athletic advantage. Educators are unconvinced about the benefits of reclassifying, and some parents of players who have reclassified are wary of the negative image of children not interacting within their age group. While the practice of redshirting in kindergarten has existed for decades, holding back kids without any evident academic or social limitations is more contentious. Critics view the move as unsportsmanlike and gaming the system. However, the increase in reclassifications has pressured many families to follow suit to remain competitive. In conjunction with the decision, the parents often transfer their child to a private school or homeschool them. Private education can be expensive, making reclassification less viable for low-income families.

Critics warn that reclassifying puts too much emphasis on athletics over academics. Opposing players and parents who decide not to reclassify are likely to resent the age gap. Reclassified students could experience reverberations from being in classrooms of younger students and seeing their former classmates graduating and reaching other milestones ahead of them. Most states limit students to four years of athletic competition in public high schools. Public schools in California do not permit parents to have their child repeat a grade for athletic or social purposes, and the California Interscholastic Federation does not allow athletes to compete if they turn 19 before June 15 of their senior year. Louisiana public schools do not allow a student to repeat sixth, seventh or eighth grade for athletic reasons. In Maryland, public schools do not allow athletes to play after turning 19 or after having played four years. In Pennsylvania, the Pennsylvania Interscholastic Athletic Association deducts a year of eligibility from athletes who repeat the eighth grade without a valid reason.

As an alternative to repeating a grade, some students delay entering college for a year by enrolling in a postgraduate program at a prep school after high school. Some opt for a prep school due to academic issues, but that is not always the reason. Unlike junior college, an athlete competing in a postgraduate program does not lose a year of college eligibility.

== Graduating earlier ==
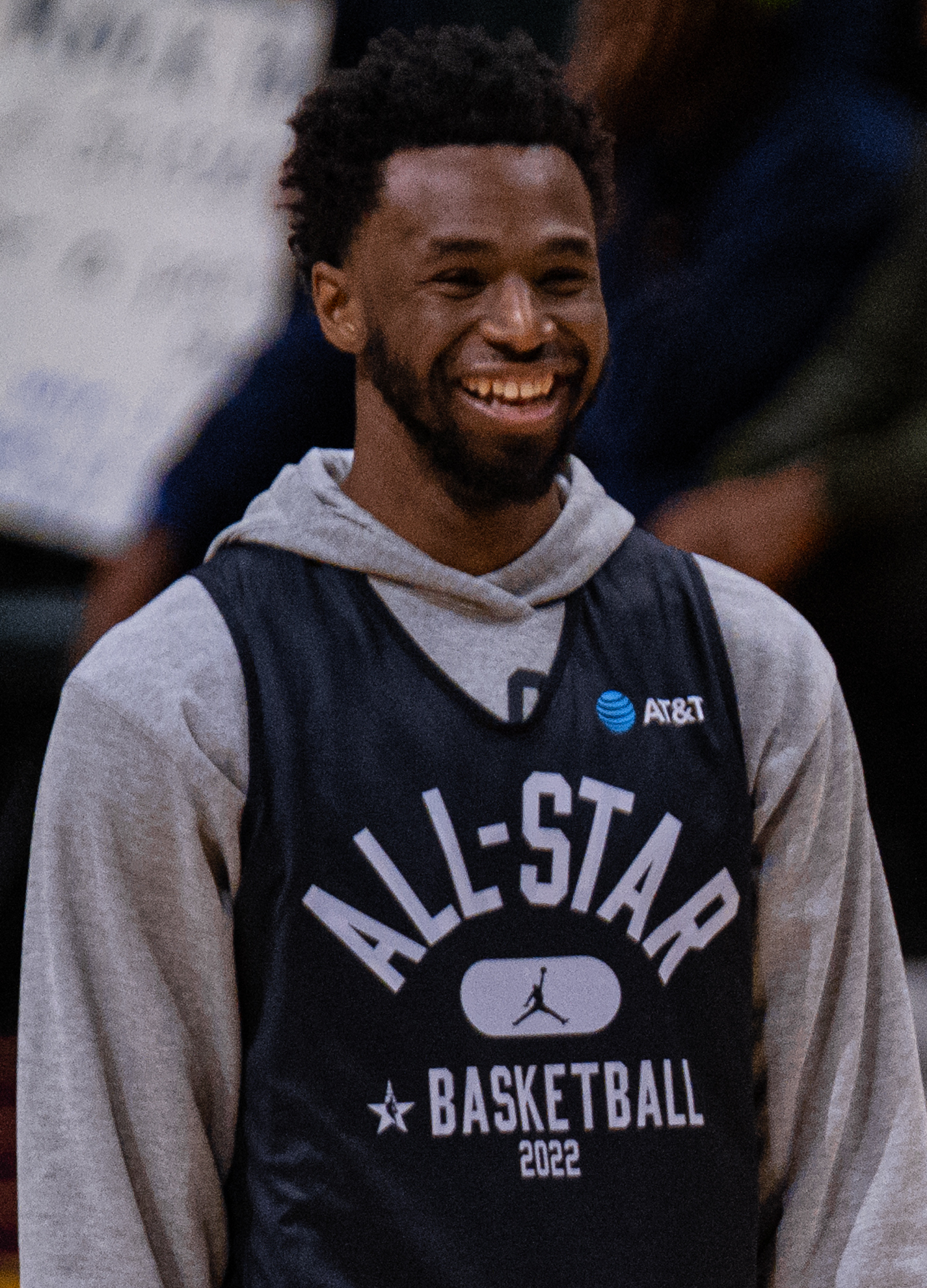
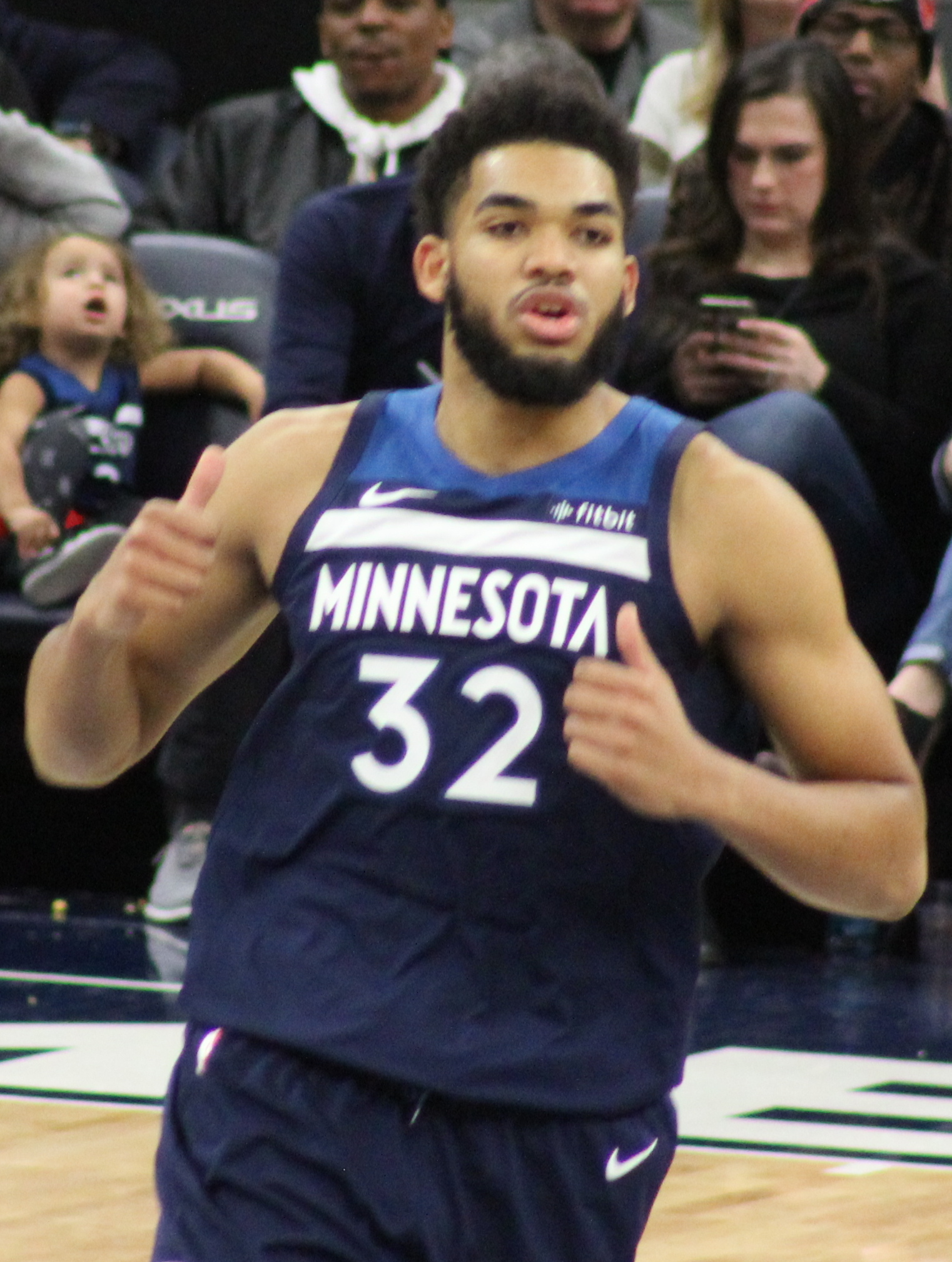
Basketball players Andrew Wiggins (left) and Karl-Anthony Towns reclassified to graduate early and were eventually drafted first overall in the NBA.

Reclassifying early became popular in American football in the 2000s. These football players generally graduated one semester early, allowing them to enroll in college and take part in the football team's spring practice before their first college season in the coming fall. It is uncommon for a football player to graduate a full year early. In basketball, Mike Gminski was a pioneer for graduating high school early to enroll at Duke University in 1976. He became an All-American for their Blue Devils basketball team before enjoying a 14-year career in the National Basketball Association (NBA). It became more popular for boys basketball players to reclassify early beginning in 2006, when the NBA stopped allowing players to jump directly into the league out of high school, instead requiring that players be one year removed from their graduating high school class before they can be drafted. Players who reclassified early that entered the NBA after one year of playing college ball include Andre Drummond, Andrew Wiggins, Noah Vonleh, Marvin Bagley, Nerlens Noel, Karl-Anthony Towns, Jamal Murray, and Cooper Flagg, who were all selected within the first 10 picks of the NBA draft. Wiggins, Towns, and Flagg were first overall picks, and Bagley was a No. 2 selection. Girls' basketball players do not have the same incentive to reclassify early, as the Women's National Basketball Association requires U.S. players (Note: The WNBA's collective bargaining agreement does not explicitly define "U.S. players", instead establishing a set of criteria defining "international players". The "international" group excludes anyone born or residing in the U.S., as well as anyone who has played U.S. college basketball.) to be 22 years old and four years out of school before they can enter its draft. (Note: CBA-defined "international players" are eligible at age 20. The eligibility age for all players, whether U.S. or international, is measured as of December 31 of the year of the draft. The CBA does allow for U.S. players to be eligible before age 22, but they must still be at least four years out of high school.)

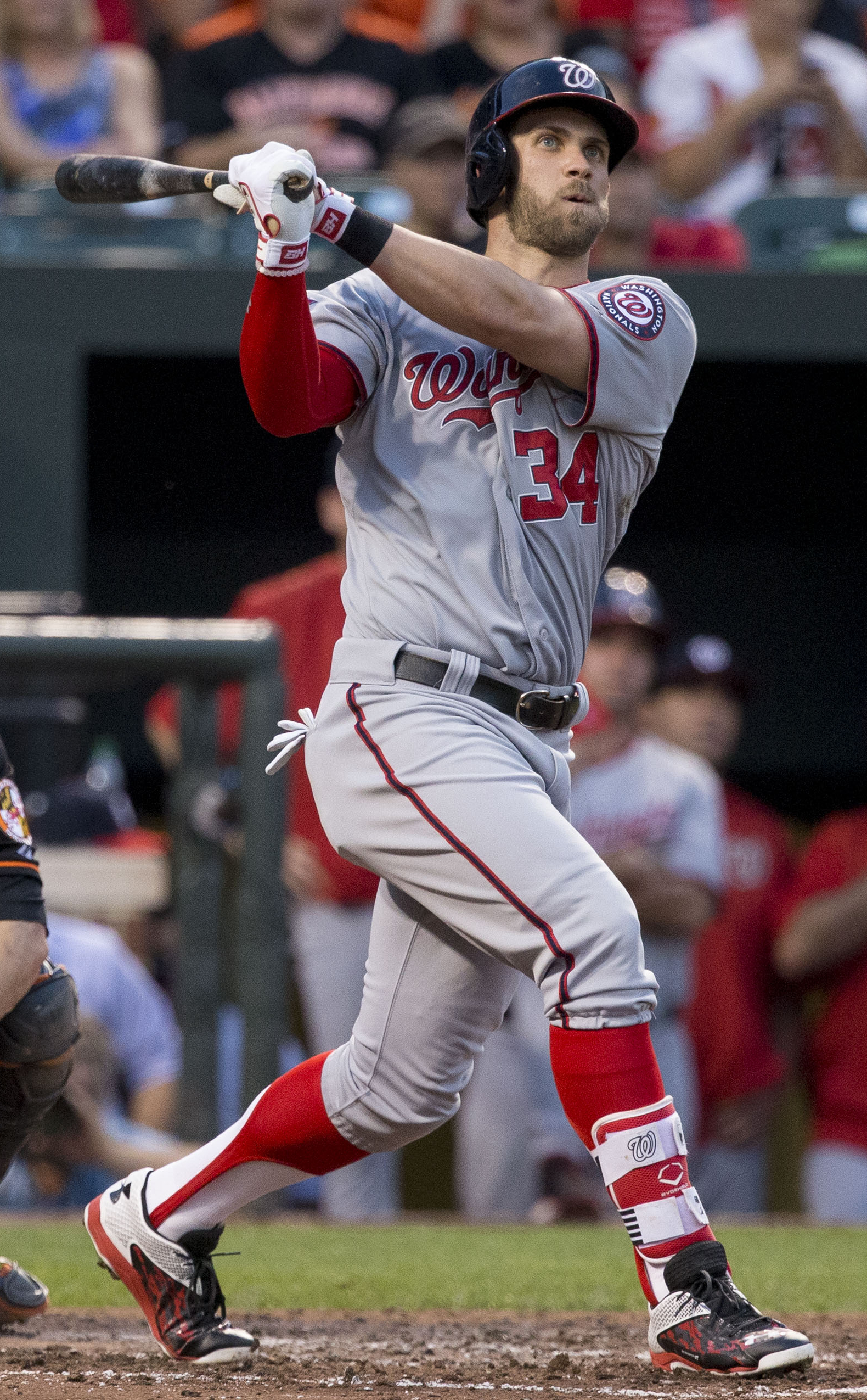
Baseball player Bryce Harper graduated after his sophomore year and became the first overall MLB draft pick the following year in 2010.

A financial incentive awaiting earlier graduates includes name, image, and likeness compensation in college. Some athletes, such as basketball players Thon Maker and Anfernee Simons, reclassify early but bypass college, instead doing a postgraduate year before entering the NBA draft. Other options for boys' basketball graduates include immediately playing professionally in the NBA G League and Overtime Elite leagues, or traveling overseas to play pro ball. In baseball, Bryce Harper took and passed the GED after his sophomore year, giving him a high school equivalency certificate that made him eligible to immediately enroll at the College of Southern Nevada, a junior college in his hometown of Las Vegas. He played baseball there for a season before being chosen first overall in the 2010 Major League Baseball draft. (Note: Harper did not have to declare himself eligible for the draft. Under MLB's collective bargaining agreement, junior-college baseball players are automatically eligible for the draft. This contrasts to rules governing those who have enrolled at a four-year institution, who are not eligible to be drafted (or re-drafted) until age 21 or three years after enrollment, whichever is sooner.)

Most players who reclassify early are merely returning back to their original class, having already repeated a grade, or are enrolled in a high school or prep school that permitted a postgraduate year as a fifth year. This provides flexibility to the player if they reach the size, maturity, and intelligence to be ready to graduate and compete at the next level. In other cases, the athlete moving earlier came from an international school model, typically Canada, with a different timing than the U.S. system. Advanced Placement courses and classes on the internet can aid students in graduating earlier. The NCAA requirements for incoming students, intended to be completed after seven semesters, instead must be done in three years.

If a college coach has a conflict with too many recruits for a given year, having a player reclassify and arrive earlier could resolve the issue. It can also be used by programs to fill a void if a current player leaves unexpectedly early. The creation of the NCAA transfer portal, allowing proven college-level players to more freely transfer between schools, reduced the demand from coaches to have less-experienced high school players enter their programs earlier.

During the COVID-19 pandemic, some athletes graduated early to start their college career sooner, since the NCAA granted college athletes who competed in 2020–21 an extra year of eligibility. Players essentially got an early exposure to college courses, while also facing a higher level of athletic competition and access to training, without the year counting against them. Additionally, colleges had more stringent COVID-19 protocols and were considered safer than high schools. In 2020, when many states moved high school football from the fall to the spring of 2021 due to the pandemic, some players reclassified back to the 2020 class, graduating and enrolling in college that fall instead.

== See also ==
- Grade retention, repeating a grade due to failure
- Grade skipping
