= Age appropriateness =

Expected behaviour of a person for their age

Age appropriateness, describes people behaving as predicted by their perspective timetable of development. The perspective timetable is embedded throughout people's social life, primarily based on socially agreed age expectations and age norms. For a given behavior, such as crawling, learning to walk, learning to talk, etc., there are years within which the behavior is regarded as appropriate. By contrast, if the behavior falls out of the age range, it will be considered age-inappropriate. Most people adhere to these age norms and are aware of whether their timing is "early", "delayed", or "on time".

Age appropriateness is considered essential for children's skills development. Children's motor, cognitive and social skills are formed through several development stages. Looking at a child's functional development involves observing whether or not the child has mastered certain developmental milestones and expectations for their age. Lack of exposure to age-appropriate activities and experiences in a specific stage is thought to prevent a child from gaining the skills necessary for their current and thus their next stage of development.

There are various sanctions associated with age inappropriateness, ranging from social isolation, damage to physical health and cognitive development, and forming of improper behaviour.

== Childhood development ==
Children develop physically, mentally, socially, and emotionally in largely predictable patterns. Physically, for example, most babies develop the skill of walking when they are about one year old. They usually develop the social and mental skills needed to play peekaboo by the age of 8 months. Being able to do these things at the usual developmental time is age-appropriate.

Sometimes age-inappropriate behaviors and beliefs indicate a developmental disorder. For example, babies and toddlers do not understand the concept of a fictional character, such as Elmo, being different from a real person, but most children understand this concept by the time they are four years old. It is age-appropriate and developmentally normal for young children to believe in Santa Claus, and equally age-appropriate and developmentally normal for them to stop believing in Santa Claus by the time they are eight years old or so. However, believing in Santa is age-inappropriate for older children and teenagers; the few who do often have autism or other neurodevelopmental disorders.

== Social participation ==
=== Application ===
Age-appropriate social skills and communication with peers can be interpreted in terms of cause and effect. Insufficient sets of age-appropriate social skills result in difficulty establishing social relations, and lack of social ties can worsen the underdeveloped set of social skills.

Students prefer to associate with those similar to them in various dimensions, such as age, gender, race, educational attainment, values, interests and/or beliefs, etc. This phenomenon is termed homophily. Therefore, normal students with age-appropriate social skills are more likely to gather together, building up friendships and cohesive groups among peers.

=== Sanctions of age-inappropriateness ===
Students with special needs, especially those with autism spectrum disorders and serious behavioural disorders, experience severe obstacles in social participation, which involves building up friendships or relationships, contacts or interactions, social self-perception, and being accepted by classmates.

These experiences of segregation in the early school years may threaten children's social development directly. Their lack of contact with peers, underdevelopment of age-appropriate social skills, and negative self-concepts result in externalizing, such as aggression, and internalizing problems, such as anxiety.

== School entry ==
=== Applications ===
School is an institute designed to provide students with learning spaces and environments under the guidance of teachers, where students lay the foundation and get prepared for future skill development. Therefore, it is vital that children enter school at an appropriate age.

Some students are older-within-cohort, which means they fall outside their cohort's standard 12-month age range, either because they are forced to hold back or voluntarily postpone the entry. Forced grade retention occurs because students fail to catch up with peers or their families fail to support their studies. Voluntary late access to school is termed "academic redshirting". Redshirting happens among students who have a relatively late birthday just before the cutoff date or those considered relatively immature for school. Both forced and voluntary retention aims to spare time for the students to catch up or get prepared.

Four views compare the strengths and weaknesses of delayed and on-time entry.

- The nativist view states that children should be adequately mature when entering school.
- The environmental view holds that children's readiness for school is evaluated by the amount of common knowledge they have.
- The social constructivist view states that school readiness depends on individual, social, and cultural backgrounds.
- The interactionist view considers readiness as bi-directional, regarding both students' readiness and the capacity of the school to meet the child's needs.

The nativist and social constructivist stand for retention since they believe it prepares children for school, predicting better academic performance. On the other hand, the environmental and interactionist views are often the basis for on-time schooling because it is age-appropriate for children to do so, and school will accommodate variations in students.

=== Sanctions of age-inappropriateness ===
Research has shown that retention or "redshirting" generates few academic advantages. Though delayed entry could generate statistically significant improvements in academic performance in the short run (usually in the first three years), the progress loses its significance in the long run. Long-term speaking, markedly older-for-cohort students were higher in school disengagement, lower in positive intentions, lower in homework completion, and lower in performance scores. These findings support environmental and interactionist views, enhancing the importance of age appropriateness in children's development.

== Playing ==
=== Application ===
It is crucial that parents select appropriate toys for children to aid their development and ensure their safety. Various guidelines have been published to ensure toy safety, such as U.S. Consumer Product Safety Commission (CPSC) in the US, Guidance on Toy Safety by EU Commission, etc.

=== Importance of age-appropriateness ===
Research has shown that appropriate play enhances children's development in 4 dimensions:

1. physical development
2. cognitive development (creativity, discovery, language skills, verbal judgment and reasoning, symbolic thought, problem-solving skills, and the ability to focus and control behaviour),
3. emotional development (awareness, sensitivity to others, emotional strength and stability, spontaneity, humour, and feelings about self)
4. social development (social learning)

These toys match with children's current developmental skills and abilities, further encouraging the development of new skills.

In determining toy safety, the toy's characteristics, how the toy might be used or abused, and the amount of supervision needed for playing safely should be considered. Typical risky toys may include high-powered magnetic objects, toys with small parts that could cause a potentially fatal choking hazard, etc.

== Exposure to media ==
=== Application ===
Various content rating systems and parental controls have been developed to prevent the harm that age-inappropriate media presentations bring to children. The two main categories of rating are the evaluating rating system based on age appropriateness and the descriptive rating system based on the content description.

Examples of evaluating rating systems include the Canadian Home Video Rating System, Korea Media Rating Board, the Movie and Television Review and Classification Board of the Philippines, the Office of Film and Literature Classification (New Zealand), the British Board of Film Classification, the Australian Classification Board, and the Film Classification and Rating Organization (Eirin) of Japan.

=== Impact of age-inappropriateness ===
See Effects of violence in mass media.

== See also ==
- Adultism
- Ageism
- Elsagate
- Family-friendly
- Lie-to-children
- Status offense
- Children's Online Privacy Protection Act
