= Debility =

Debility can refer to:

- Debility (medical)
- Debility (astrology)
