= Cardinal sign =

Cardinal sign may refer to:

- Cardinal sign (astrology), a way of classifying astrological signs
- Cardinal signs, major diagnostic signs in medicine
