= Astrological sign =

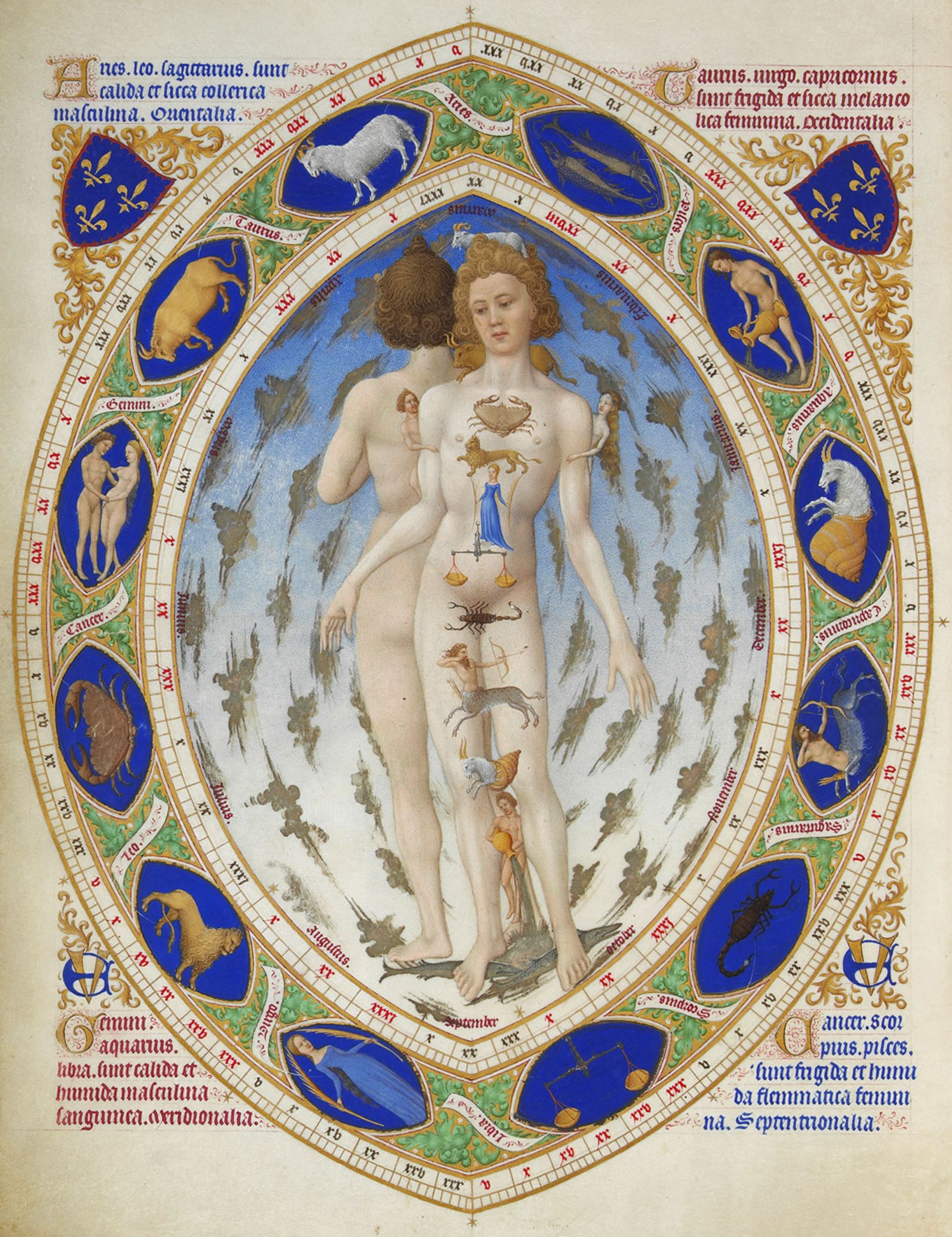
Anatomical Zodiac Man from the Très Riches Heures du Duc de Berry

In Western astrology, astrological signs are the zodiac, twelve 30-degree sectors that are crossed by the Sun's 360-degree orbital path as viewed from Earth in its sky. The signs enumerate from the first day of spring, known as the First Point of Aries, which is the vernal equinox. The astrological signs are Aries, Taurus, Gemini, Cancer, Leo, Virgo, Libra, Scorpio, Sagittarius, Capricorn, Aquarius, and Pisces. The Western zodiac originated in Babylonian astrology, and was later influenced by the Hellenistic culture. Each sign was named after a constellation the sun annually moved through while crossing the sky. This observation is emphasized in the simplified and popular sun sign astrology. Over the centuries, Western astrology's zodiacal divisions have shifted out of alignment with the constellations they were named after by axial precession of the Earth while Hindu astrology measurements correct for this shifting. Astrology (i.e. a system of omina based on celestial appearances) was developed in Chinese and Tibetan cultures as well but these astrologies are not based upon the zodiac but deal with the whole sky.

Astrology is a pseudoscience. Scientific investigations of the theoretical basis and experimental verification of claims have shown it to have no scientific validity or explanatory power. More plausible explanations for the apparent correlation between personality traits and birth months exist, such as the influence of seasonal birth in humans.

According to astrology, celestial phenomena relate to human activity on the principle of "as above, so below", so that the signs are held to represent characteristic modes of expression. Scientific astronomy used the same sectors of the ecliptic as Western astrology until the 19th century.

Various approaches to measuring and dividing the sky are currently used by differing systems of astrology, although the tradition of the Zodiac's names and symbols remain mostly consistent. Western astrology measures from Equinox and Solstice points (points relating to equal, longest, and shortest days of the tropical year), while Hindu astrology measures along the equatorial plane (sidereal year).

== Western zodiac signs ==
=== History ===
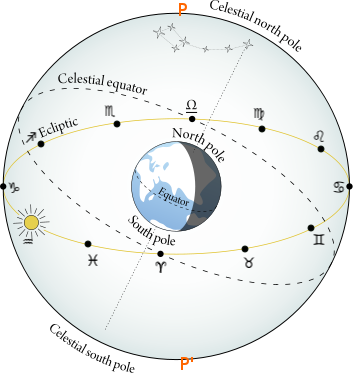
The twelve ecliptic signs. Each dot marks the start of a sign and they are separated by 30°. The intersection of the celestial equator and the ecliptic define the equinoctial points: First Point of Aries and First Point of Libra. The great circle containing the celestial poles and the ecliptic poles (P and P′), intersect the ecliptic at 0° Cancer and 0° Capricorn. In this illustration, the Sun is schematically positioned at the start of Aquarius.

Western astrology is a direct continuation of Hellenistic astrology as recorded in Ptolemy's Tetrabiblos in the 2nd century. Hellenistic astrology in turn was partly based on concepts from Babylonian tradition. Specifically, the division of the ecliptic in twelve equal sectors is a Babylonian conceptual construction. This division of the ecliptic originated in the Babylonian "ideal calendar" found in the old compendium MUL.APIN and its combination with the Babylonian lunar calendar, represented as the "path of the moon" in MUL.APIN. In a way, the zodiac is the idealisation of an ideal lunar calendar.

By the 4th century BC, Babylonian astronomy and its system of celestial omens influenced the culture of ancient Greece, as did the astronomy of Egypt by late 2nd century BC. This resulted, unlike the Mesopotamian tradition, in a strong focus on the birth chart of the individual and the creation of Horoscopic astrology, employing the use of the Ascendant (the rising degree of the ecliptic, at the time of birth), and of the twelve houses. Association of the astrological signs with Empedocles' four classical elements was another important development in the characterization of the twelve signs.

The body of the Hellenistic astrological tradition as it stood by the 2nd century is described in Ptolemy's Tetrabiblos. This is the seminal work for later astronomical tradition not only in the West but also in India and the Islamic sphere and has remained a reference for almost seventeen centuries as later traditions made few substantial changes to its core teachings.

=== Western astrological correspondence chart ===
The following table shows the approximate dates of the twelve astrological signs, along with the classical and modern rulerships of each sign. By definition, Aries starts at the First Point of Aries which is the location of the Sun at the March equinox. The precise date of the Equinox varies from year to year but is always between 19 March and 21 March. The consequence is the start date of Aries and therefore the start date of all the other signs can change slightly from year to year. The following Western astrology table enumerates the twelve divisions of celestial longitude with the Latin names. The longitude intervals, are treated as closed for the first endpoint (a) and open for the second (b) – for instance, 30° of longitude is the first point of Taurus, not part of Aries. The signs are occasionally numbered 0 through 11 in place of symbols in astronomical works.

Overview of Western astrological signs
Sign	Gloss	Symbol	Unicode Character	Approximate Sun Sign Start Dates	Approximate Sun Sign End Dates	Ecliptic Longitude (a ≤ λ < b)	House	Polarity	Triplicity	Modality	Northern Hemisphere Season	Southern Hemisphere Season	Modern Ruler	Classic Ruler
Aries	The Ram		♈︎	21 March	20 April	0° to 30°	1	Positive	Fire	Cardinal	Spring	Autumn	Mars	
Taurus	The Bull		♉︎	21 April	21 May	30° to 60°	2	Negative	Earth	Fixed	Spring	Autumn	Venus	
Gemini	The Twins		♊︎	22 May	21 June	60° to 90°	3	Positive	Air	Mutable	Spring	Autumn	Mercury	
Cancer	The Crab		♋︎	22 June	23 July	90° to 120°	4	Negative	Water	Cardinal	Summer	Winter	Moon	
Leo	The Lion		♌︎	24 July	23 August	120° to 150°	5	Positive	Fire	Fixed	Summer	Winter	Sun	
Virgo	The Maiden, Virgin		♍︎	24 August	23 September	150° to 180°	6	Negative	Earth	Mutable	Summer	Winter	Mercury	
Libra	The Scales		♎︎	24 September	23 October	180° to 210°	7	Positive	Air	Cardinal	Autumn	Spring	Venus	
Scorpio	The Scorpion		♏︎	24 October	22 November	210° to 240°	8	Negative	Water	Fixed	Autumn	Spring	Pluto (or)	Mars
Sagittarius	The Archer (Centaur)		♐︎	23 November	21 December	240° to 270°	9	Positive	Fire	Mutable	Autumn	Spring	Jupiter	
Capricorn	The Goat		♑︎	22 December	20 January	270° to 300°	10	Negative	Earth	Cardinal	Winter	Summer	Saturn	
Aquarius	The Water-bearer		♒︎	21 January	19 February	300° to 330°	11	Positive	Air	Fixed	Winter	Summer	Uranus	Saturn
Pisces	The Fish		♓︎	20 February	20 March	330° to 360°	12	Negative	Water	Mutable	Winter	Summer	Neptune	Jupiter

The twelve signs are positioned in a circular pattern, creating a pattern of oppositions related to different philosophically polarized attributes. Fire and air elements are generally 180 degrees opposed in Western astrology, as well as earth and water elements. Not all systems of astrology have four elements, notably the Sepher Yetzirah describes only three elements emanating from a central divine source. Spring signs are opposite to autumn ones, winter signs are opposite to summer ones and vice versa.

- Aries is opposite to Libra
- Taurus is opposite to Scorpio
- Gemini is opposite to Sagittarius
- Cancer is opposite to Capricorn
- Leo is opposite to Aquarius
- Virgo is opposite to Pisces

==== Polarity ====
In Western astrology, the polarity divides the zodiac in half and refers to the alignment of a sign's energy as either positive or negative, with various attributes associated to them as a result. Positive polarity signs, also called active, yang, expressive, or masculine signs, are the six odd-numbered signs of the zodiac: Aries, Gemini, Leo, Libra, Sagittarius, and Aquarius. Positive signs make up the fire and air triplicities. Negative polarity signs, also called passive, yin, receptive, or feminine signs, are the six even-numbered signs of the zodiac: Taurus, Cancer, Virgo, Scorpio, Capricorn, and Pisces. Negative signs make up the earth and water triplicities.

==== The three modalities ====
The modality or mode of a given sign refers to its position in the season it is found in. Each of the four elements manifests in three modalities: cardinal, fixed, and mutable. Each modality comprehends four signs, also known as Quadruplicities. For example, the sign Aries is found in the first month of spring in the Northern Hemisphere, so practitioners of astrology describe it as having a cardinal modality. The combination of element and modality provides the signs with their unique characterizations. For instance, Capricorn is the cardinal earth sign, impressing its association with action (cardinal modality) in the material world (earth element).

Modalities of astrological signs
Modality	3 primes	Alt. symbols	Keywords	Fire signs	Water signs	Air signs	Earth signs
Cardinal	🜍		Action, dynamic, initiative, great force	Aries	Cancer	Libra	Capricorn
Fixed	🜔	⊟	Resistance to change, great willpower, inflexible	Leo	Scorpio	Aquarius	Taurus
Mutable	☿	🜳	Adaptability, flexibility, resourcefulness	Sagittarius	Pisces	Gemini	Virgo

==== Triplicities of the four elements ====
The planets' sign positions on May 16, 2012. The signs are colored according to the associated element. Each planet is represented by a glyph next to its longitude within the sign. Additional symbols may be added to represent apparent retrograde motion (℞), or apparent stationary moment (shift from retrograde to direct, or vice versa: S).

The Greek philosopher Empedocles identified fire, earth, air, and water as elements in the fifth-century BC. He explained the nature of the universe as an interaction of two opposing principles, love and strife, which manipulate the elements into different mixtures that produce the different natures of things. He stated all the elements are equal, the same age, rule their own provinces, and possess their own individual character. Empedocles said that those born with nearly equal proportions of the elements are more intelligent and have the most exact perceptions.

The elemental categories are called triplicities because each classical element is associated with three signs The four astrological elements are also considered as a direct equivalent to Hippocrates' personality types (sanguine = air; choleric = fire; melancholic = earth; phlegmatic = water). A modern approach looks at elements as "the energy substance of experience" and the next table tries to summarize their description through keywords. The elements have grown in importance and some astrologers begin natal chart interpretations by studying the balance of elements in the location of planets (especially the Sun and Moon) and the position of angles in the chart.

Triplicities of the four elements
Polarity	Element	Symbol	Keywords	Sign triplicity
Positive	Fire		Assertion, drive, willpower	Aries, Leo, Sagittarius
Positive	Air		Communication, socialization, conceptualization	Gemini, Libra, Aquarius
Negative	Earth		Practicality, caution, material world	Taurus, Virgo, Capricorn
Negative	Water		Emotion, empathy, sensitivity	Cancer, Scorpio, Pisces

==== Celestial body rulerships ====
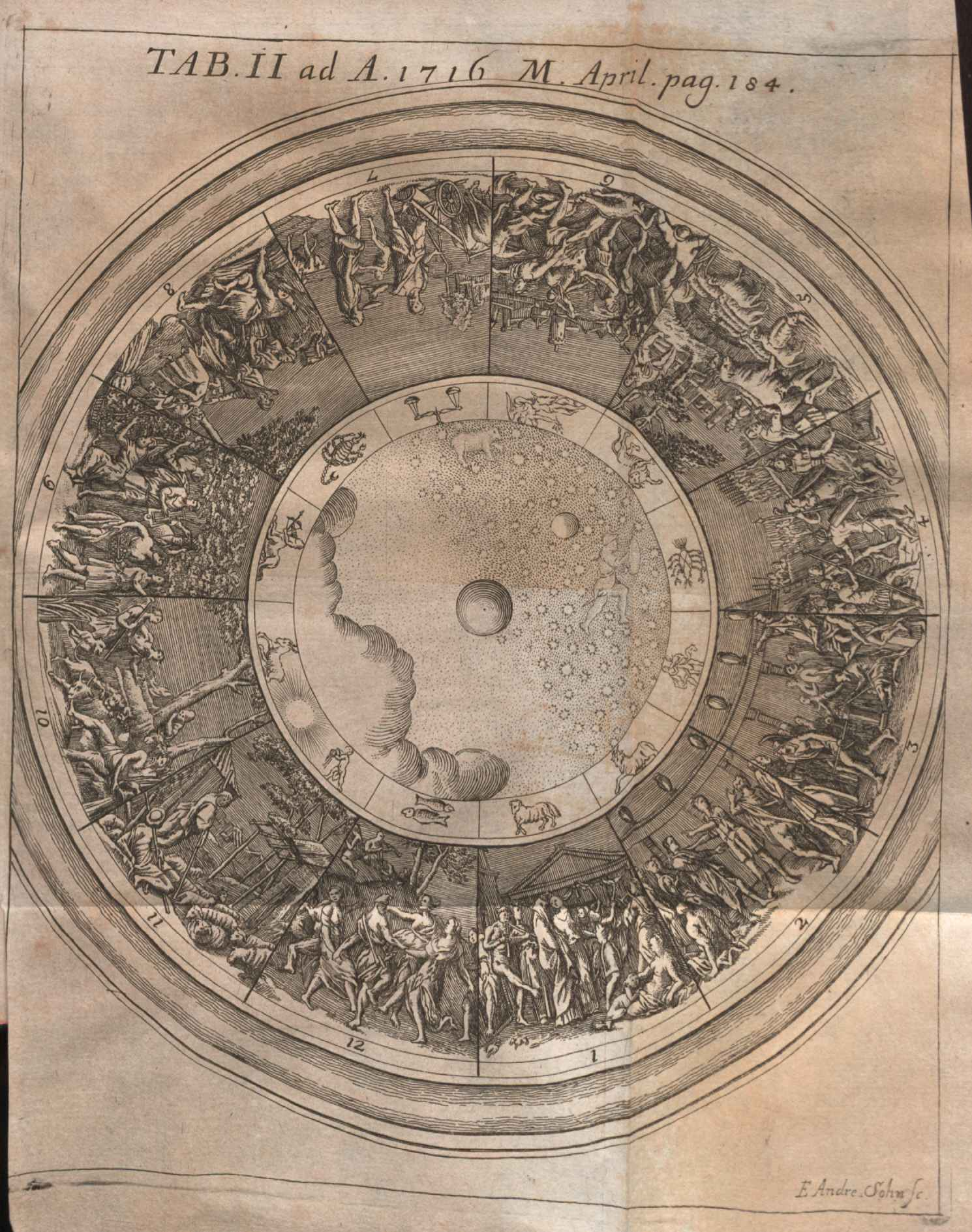
Representation of the western astrological signs in a 1716 Acta Eruditorum table illustration

Rulership is the connection between planet and correlated sign and house. The conventional rulerships are as follows:

- Aries: Mars
- Taurus: Venus
- Gemini: Mercury
- Cancer: Moon
- Leo: Sun
- Virgo: Mercury
- Libra: Venus
- Scorpio: classically Mars, Pluto starting in the 20th century
- Sagittarius: Jupiter
- Capricorn: Saturn
- Aquarius: classically Saturn, Uranus starting in the 20th century
- Pisces: classically Jupiter, Neptune starting in the 20th century

==== Dignity and detriment, exaltation and fall ====
A traditional belief of astrology, known as essential dignity, is the idea that the Sun, Moon, and planets are more powerful and effective in some signs than others because the basic nature of both is held to be in harmony. By contrast, they are held to find some signs to be weak or difficult to operate in because their natures are thought to be in conflict. These categories are Dignity, Detriment, Exaltation, and Fall.

- Dignity and Detriment: A planet is strengthened or dignified if it falls within the sign that it rules. In other words, it is said to exercise Rulership of the sign. For example, the Moon in Cancer is considered "strong" (well-dignified). If a planet is in the sign opposite which it rules (or is dignified in), it is said to be weakened or in Detriment (for example, the Moon in Capricorn). This may also be termed a "debility".

In traditional astrology, other levels of Dignity are recognised in addition to Rulership. These are known as Exaltation, Triplicity, Terms or bounds, and Face or Decan, which together are known as describing a planet's Essential dignity, the quality or ability of one's true nature.

- Exaltation and Fall: A planet is also strengthened when it is in its sign of exaltation. In traditional horary astrology, this denotes a dignity just less than rulership. Exaltation was considered to give the planet's significance(s) the dignity of an honoured guest: the centre of attention but constrained in power. Examples of planets in their Exaltation are: Saturn (Libra), Sun (Aries), Venus (Pisces), Moon (Taurus), Mercury (Virgo, although some disagree with this classification), Mars (Capricorn), Jupiter (Cancer). A planet in the opposite sign of this is in its fall, and thus weakened, perhaps more than Detriment. There is discord as to the signs in which the two extra-Saturnian planets may be considered to be exalted.

Planetary positions in Western astrology
Planet (Symbol)	▲ in dignity ▲	▼ in detriment ▼	▲ in exaltation ▲	▼ at fall ▼
Sun	Leo	Aquarius	Aries	Libra
Moon	Cancer	Capricorn	Taurus	Scorpio
Mercury	Gemini and Virgo	Sagittarius and Pisces	Virgo	Pisces
Venus	Libra and Taurus	Aries and Scorpio	Pisces	Virgo
Mars	Aries and Scorpio	Libra and Taurus	Capricorn	Cancer
Jupiter	Sagittarius and Pisces	Gemini and Virgo	Cancer	Capricorn
Saturn	Capricorn and Aquarius	Cancer and Leo	Libra	Aries

In addition to essential dignity, the traditional astrologer considers Accidental dignity of planets. This is placement by house in the chart under examination. Accidental dignity is the planet's "ability to act". So we might have, for example, Moon in Cancer, dignified by rulership, is placed in the 12th house it would have little scope to express its good nature. The twelfth is a cadent house as are the third, sixth and ninth and planets in these houses are considered weak or afflicted. On the other hand, Moon in the first, fourth, seventh, or 10th would be more able to act as these are Angular houses. Planets in Succedent houses of the chart (second, fifth, eighth, eleventh) are generally considered to be of medium ability to act. Besides Accidental Dignity, there are a range of Accidental Debilities, such as retrogradation, Under the Sun's Beams, Combust, and so forth.

==== Additional classifications ====
Equirectangular plot of declination vs right ascension of the modern constellations with a dotted line denoting the ecliptic. Constellations are colour-coded by family and year established. (detailed view)

Each sign can be divided into three 10° sectors known as decans or decanates, though these have fallen into disuse. The first decanate is said to be most emphatically of its own nature and is ruled by the sign ruler. The next decanate is sub-ruled by the planet ruling the next sign in the same triplicity. The last decanate is sub-ruled by the next in order in the same triplicity.

While the element and modality of a sign are together sufficient to define it, they can be grouped to indicate their symbolism. The first four signs, Aries, Taurus, Gemini, and Cancer, form the group of personal signs. The next four signs, Leo, Virgo, Libra, and Scorpio form the group of interpersonal signs. The last four signs of the zodiac, Sagittarius, Capricorn, Aquarius, and Pisces, form the group of transpersonal signs.

Dane Rudhyar presented the tropical zodiac primary factors, used in the curriculum of the RASA School of Astrology. The tropical zodiac is the zodiac of seasonal factors as opposed to the sidereal zodiac (constellation factors). The primary seasonal factors are based on the changing ratio of sunlight and darkness across the year. The first factor is whether the chosen time falls in the half of the year when daylight is increasing, or the half of the year when darkness is increasing. The second factor is whether the chosen time falls in the half of the year when there is more daylight than darkness, or the half when there is more darkness than daylight. The third factor is which of the four seasons the chosen time falls in, defined by the first two factors. Thus

- The spring season is when daylight is increasing and there is more daylight than darkness.
- The summer season is when darkness is increasing and there is more daylight than darkness.
- The autumn season is when darkness is increasing and there is more darkness than daylight.
- The winter season is when daylight is increasing and there is more darkness than daylight.

=== Western sign gallery ===
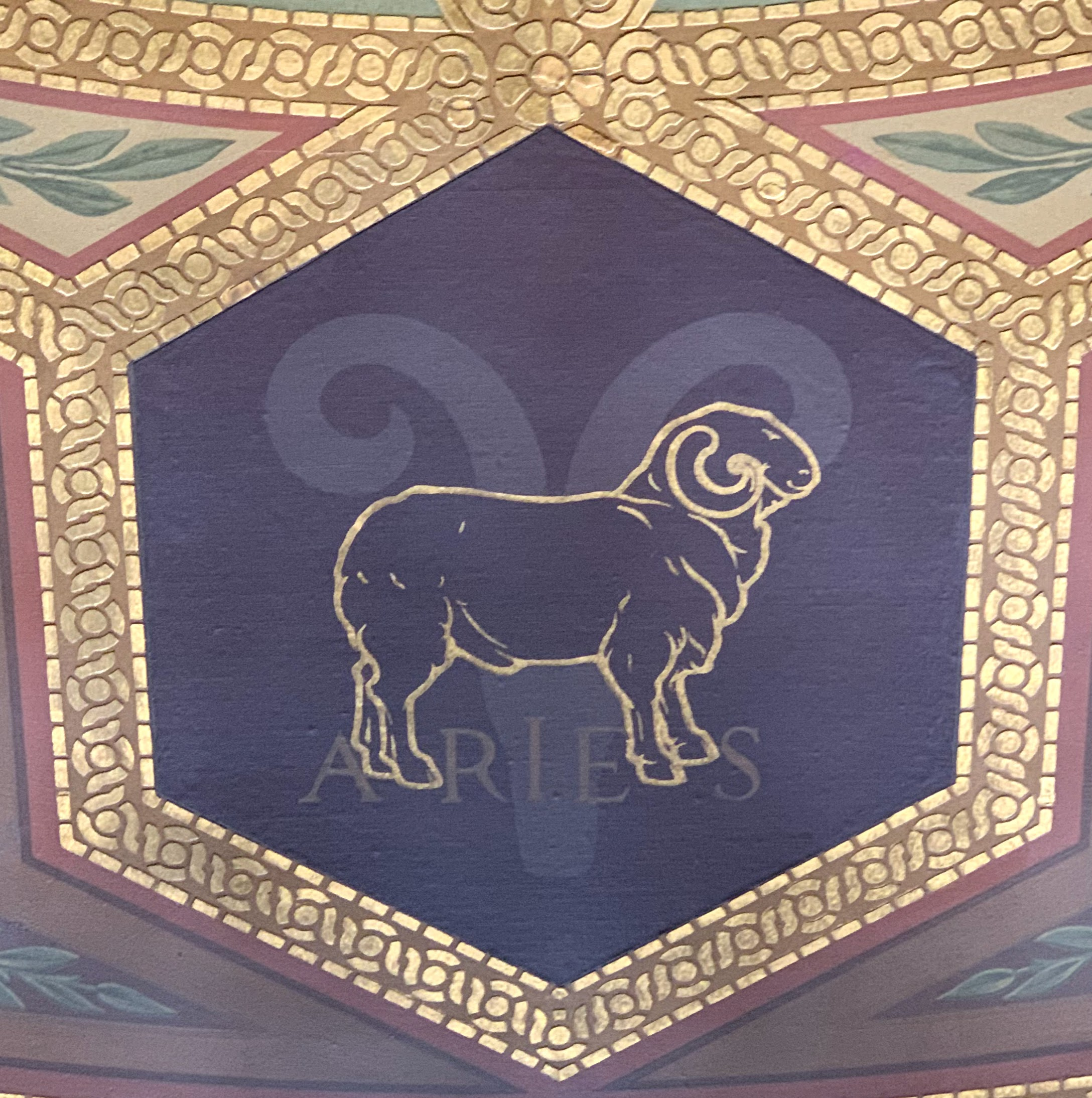
Aries at the Wisconsin State Capitol

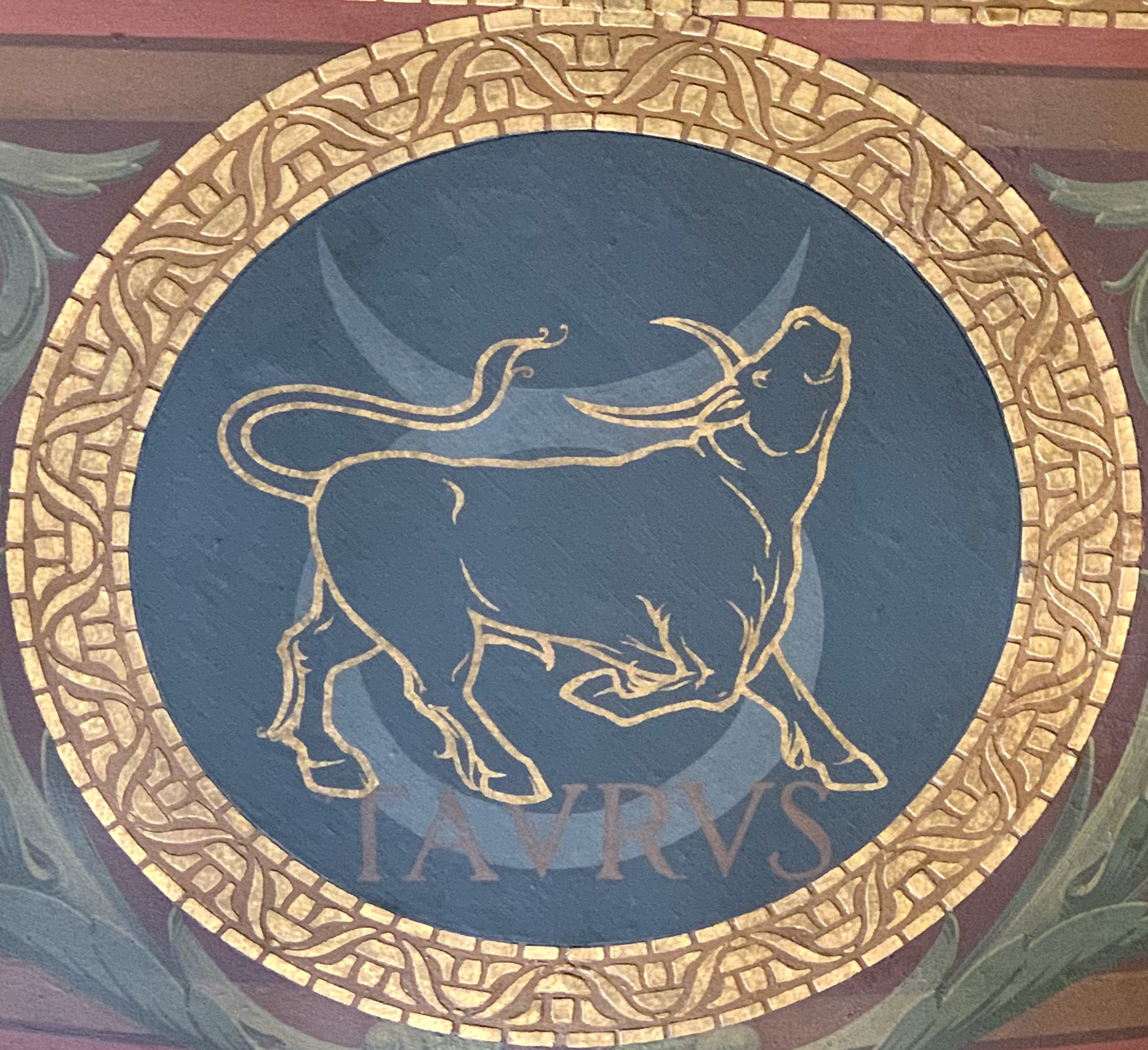
Taurus at the Wisconsin State Capitol

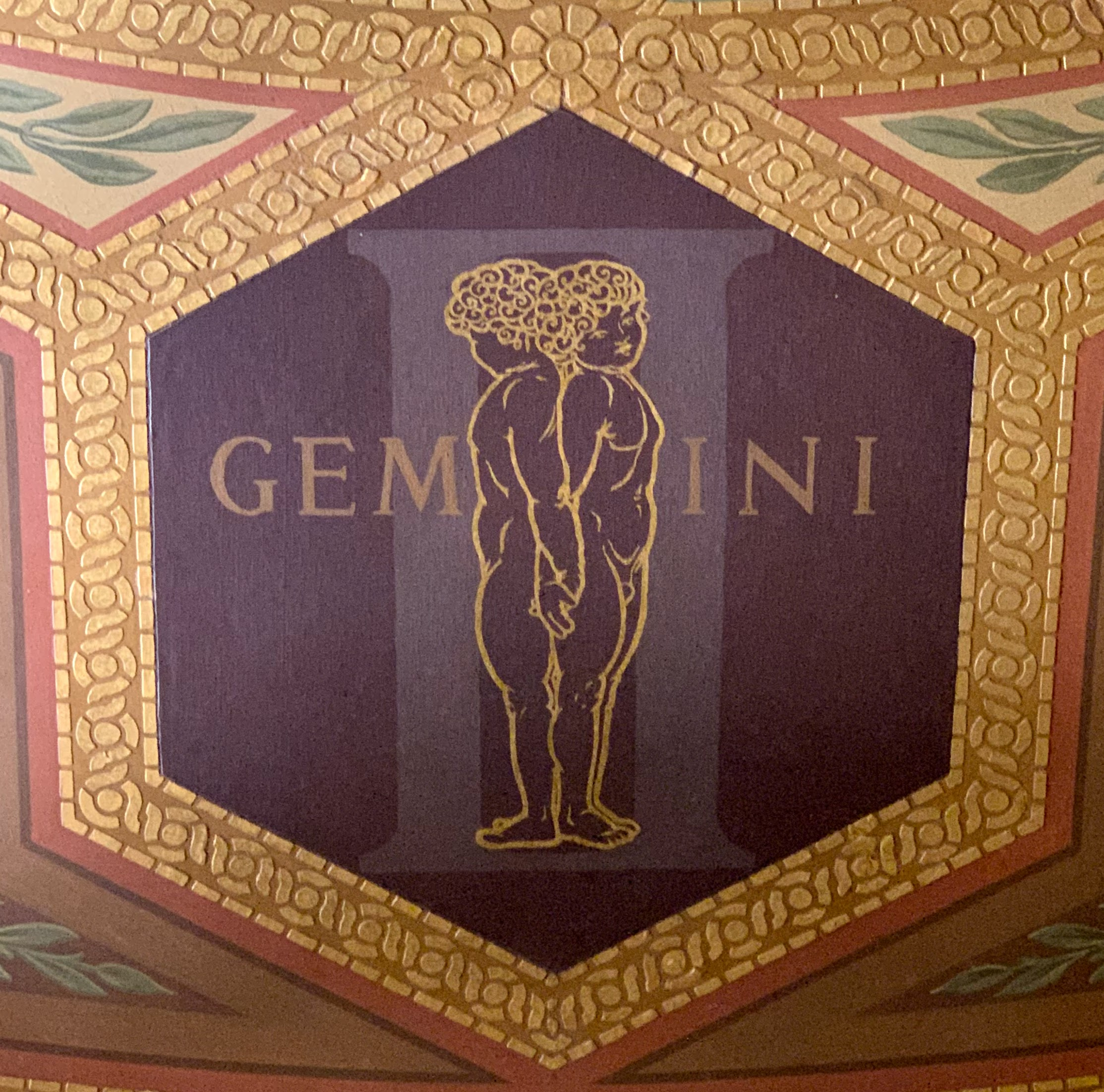
Gemini at the Wisconsin State Capitol

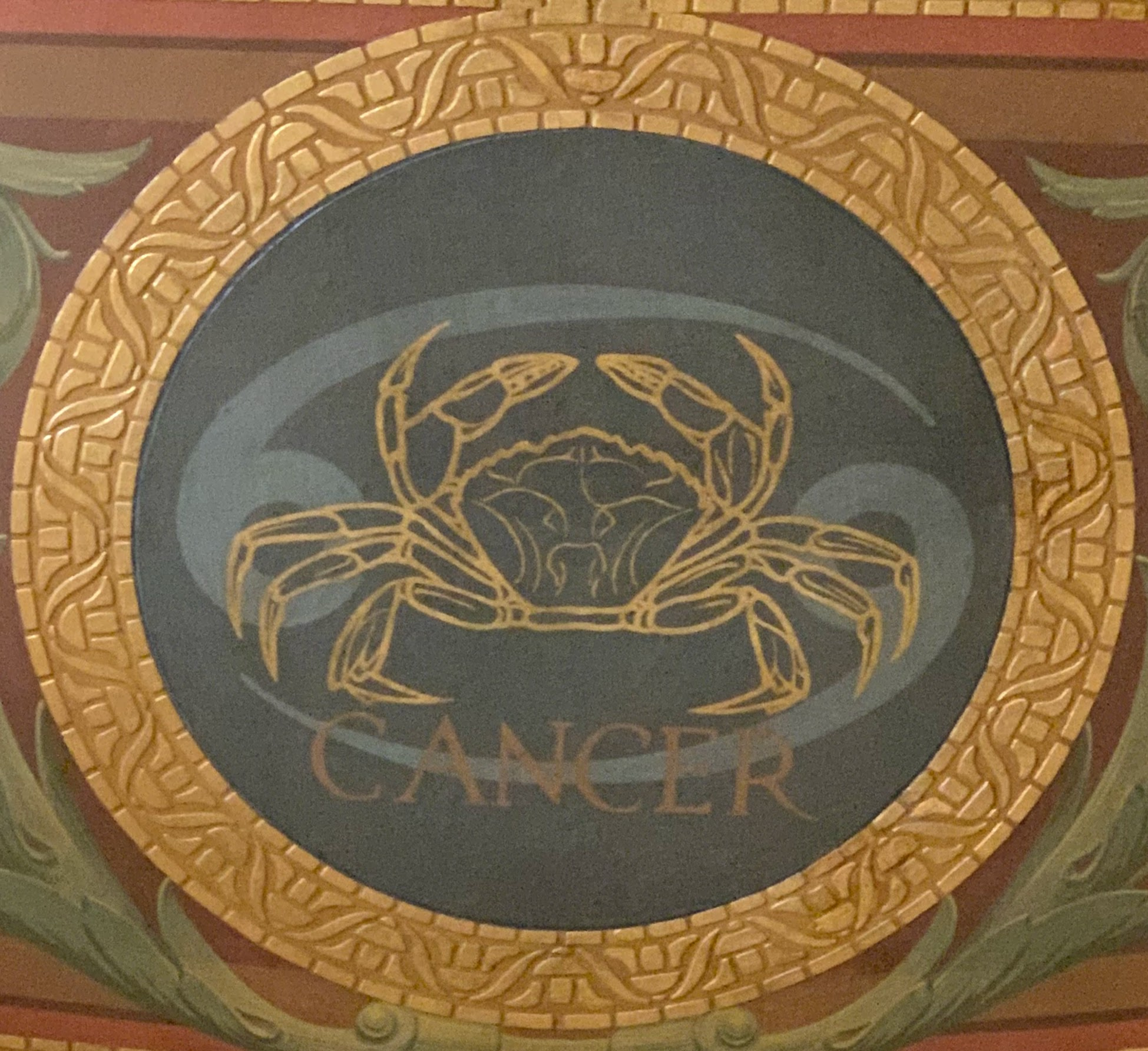
Cancer at the Wisconsin State Capitol

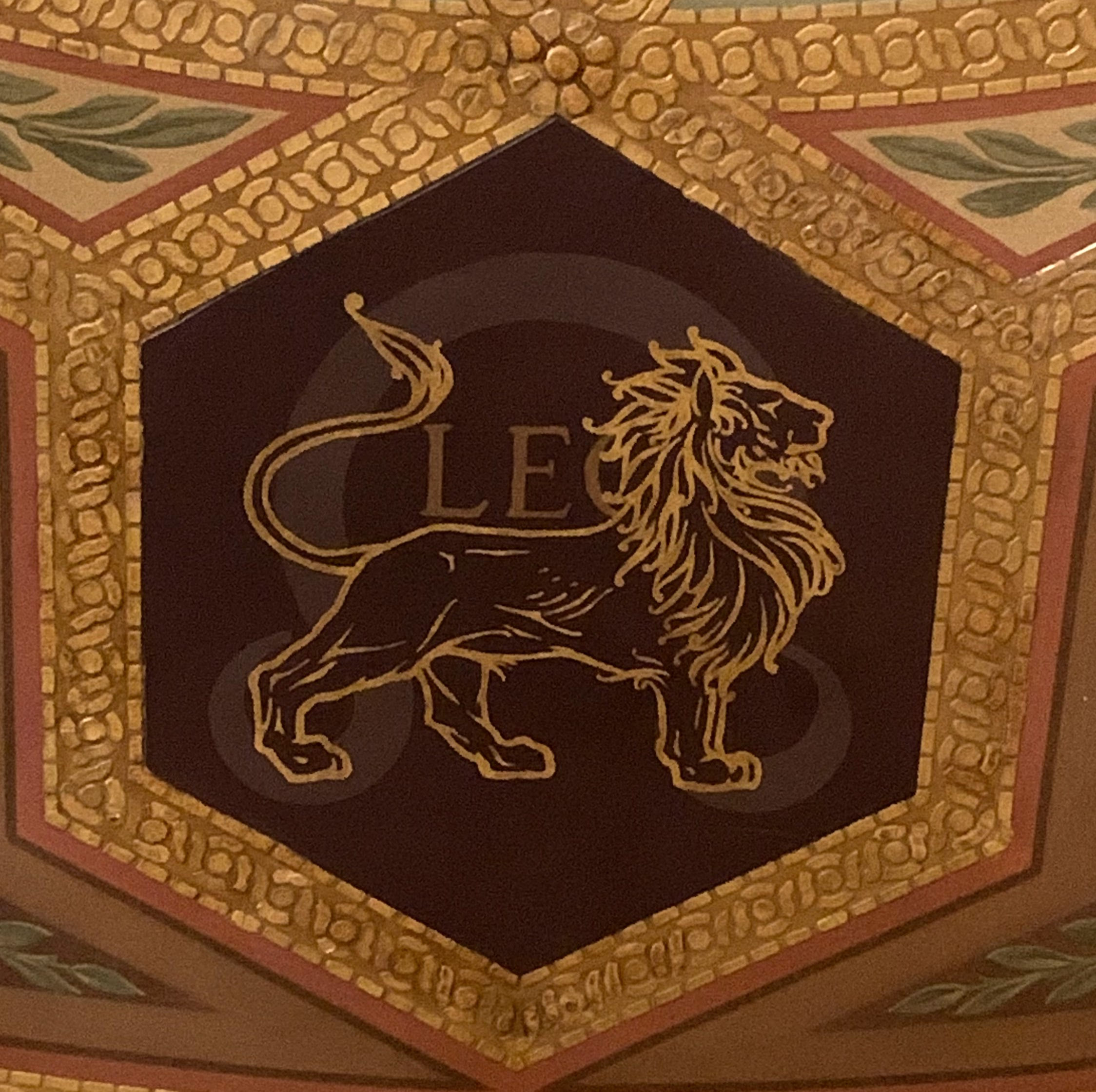
Leo at the Wisconsin State Capitol

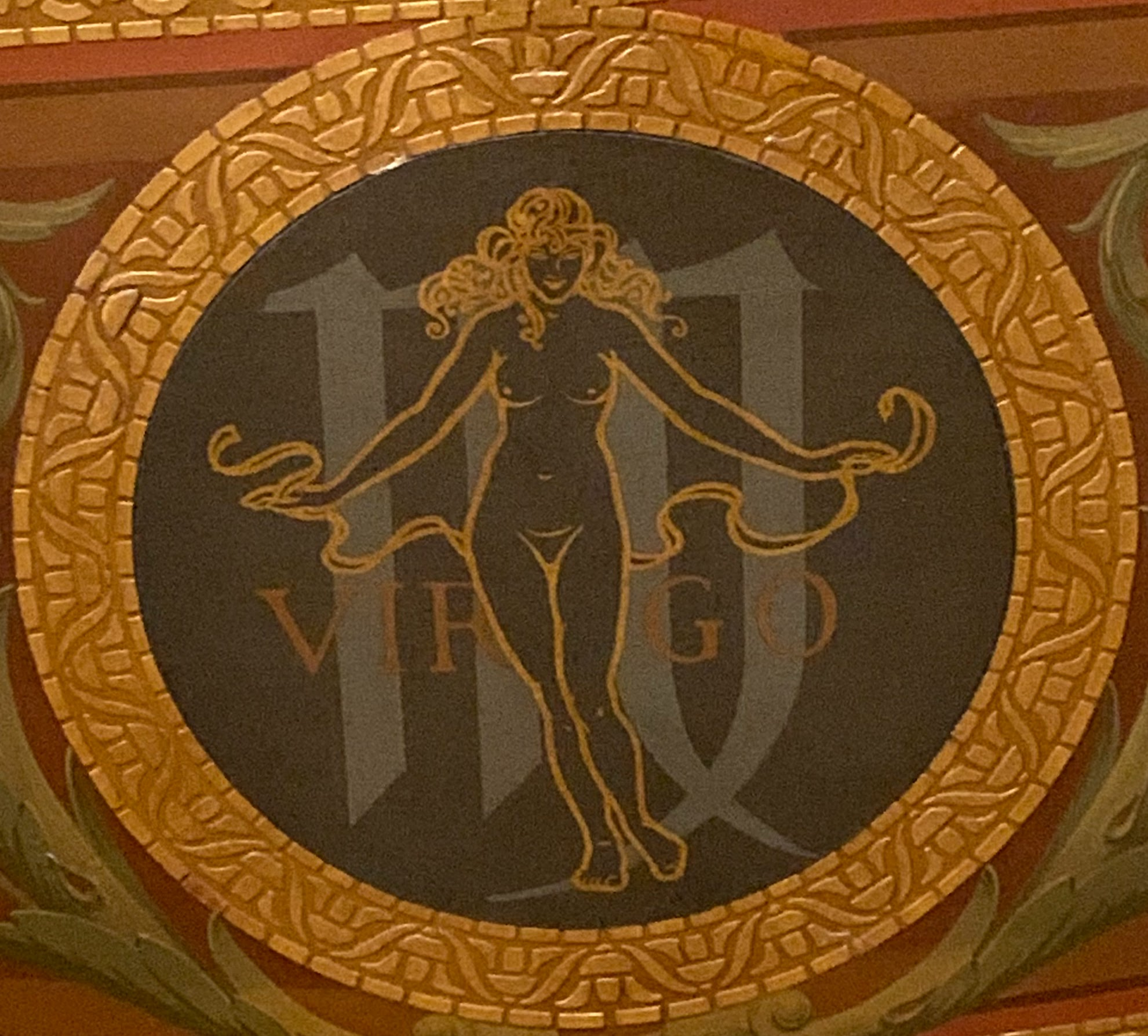
Virgo at the Wisconsin State Capitol

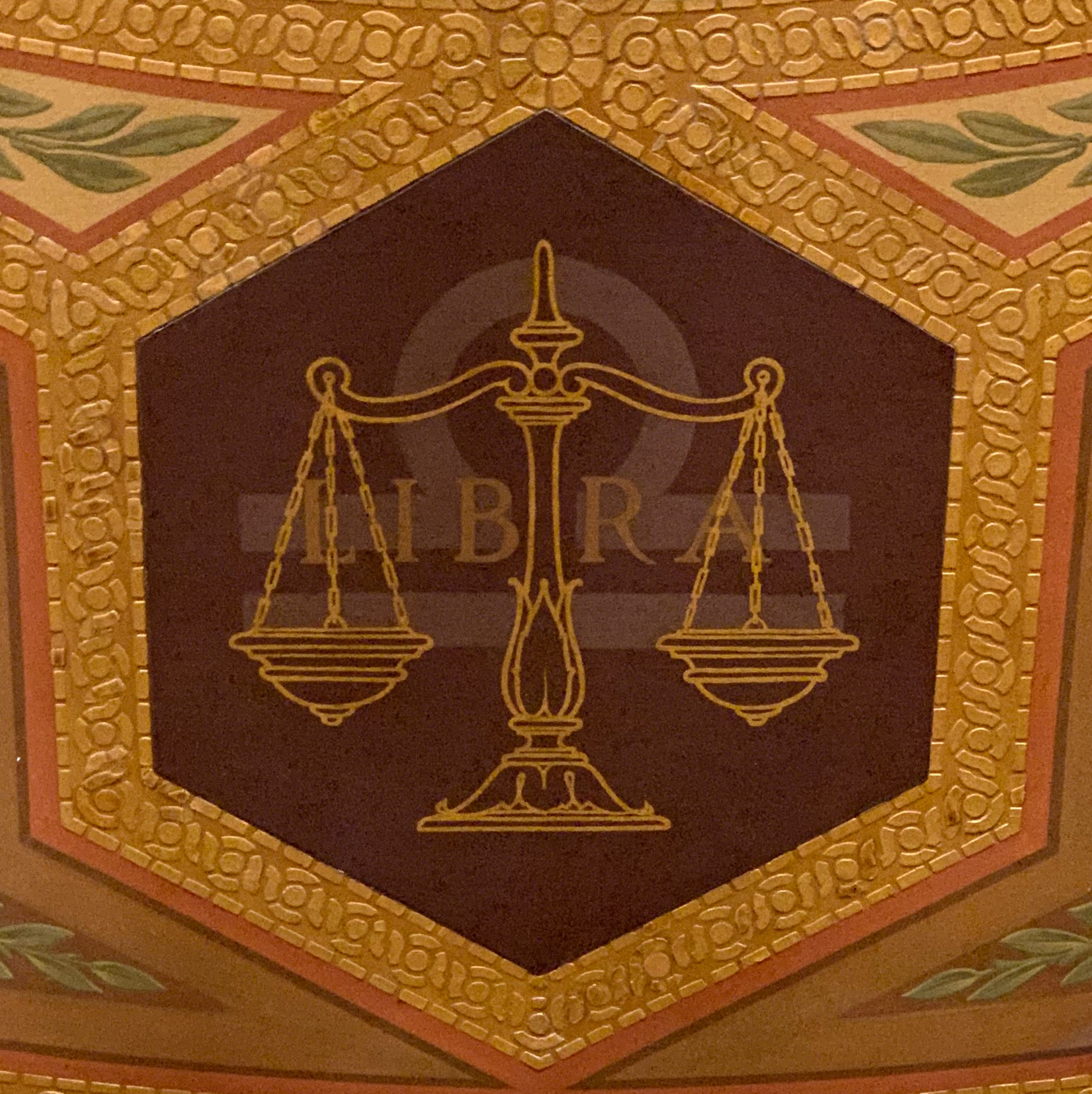
Libra at the Wisconsin State Capitol

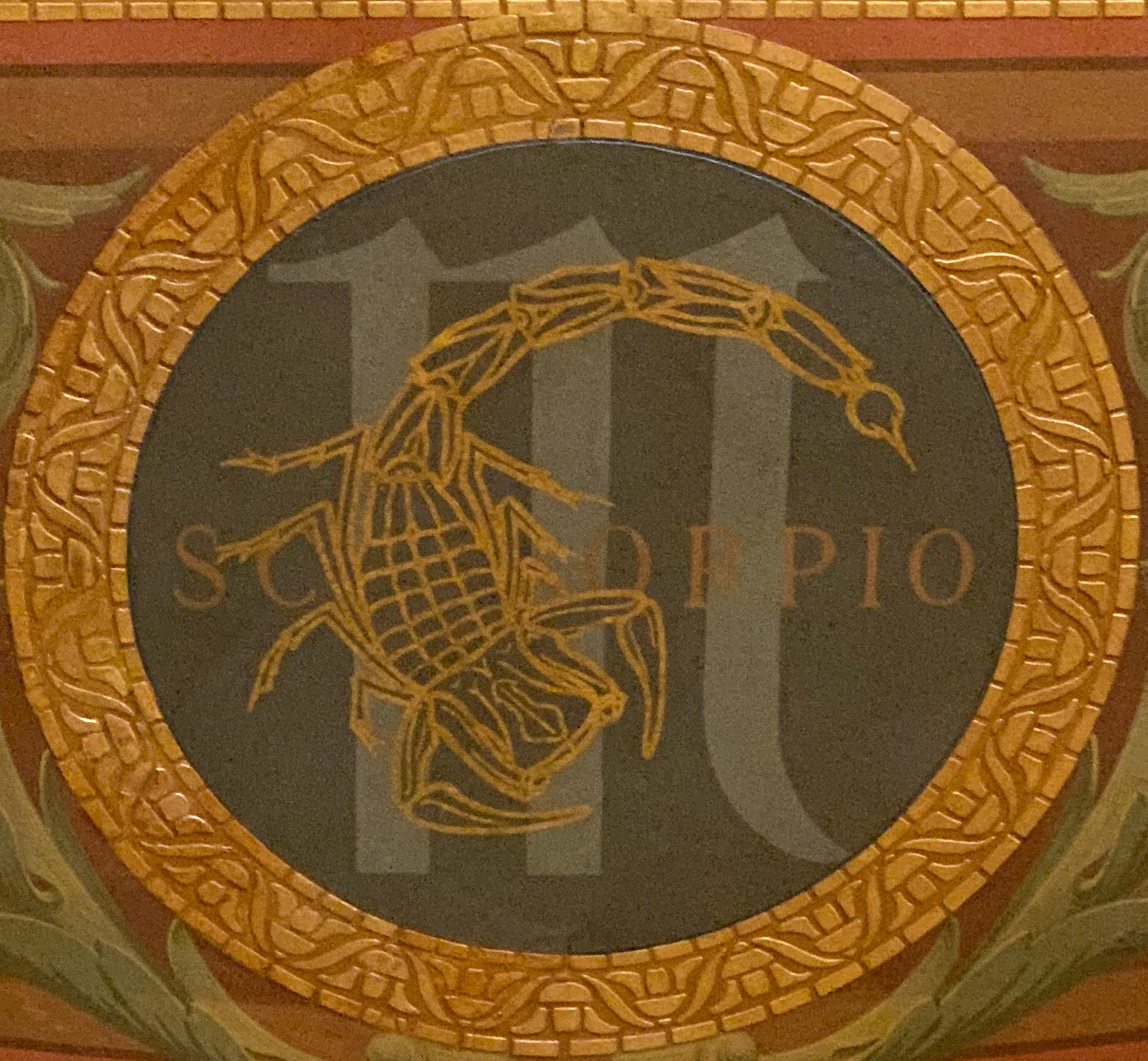
Scorpio at the Wisconsin State Capitol

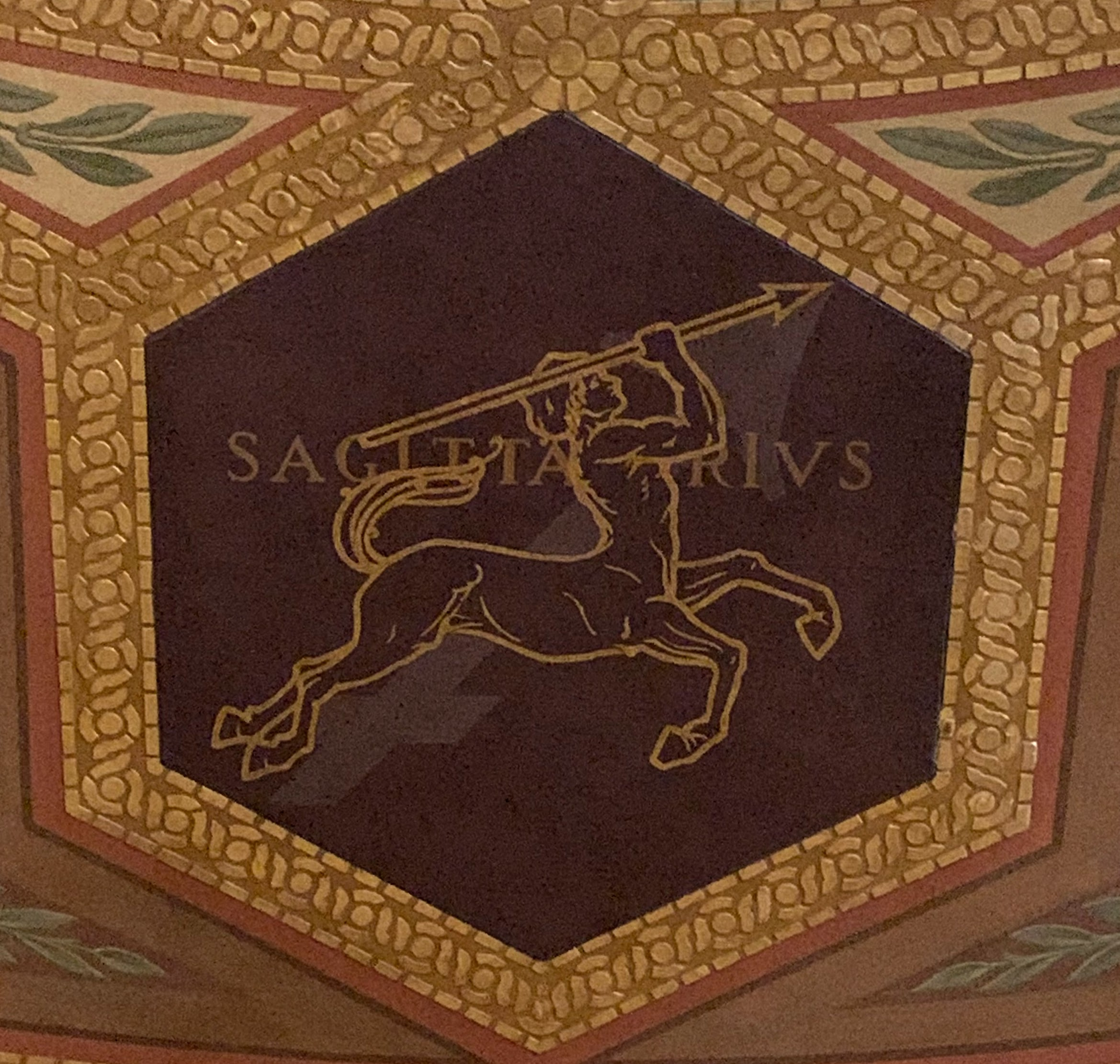
Sagittarius at the Wisconsin State Capitol

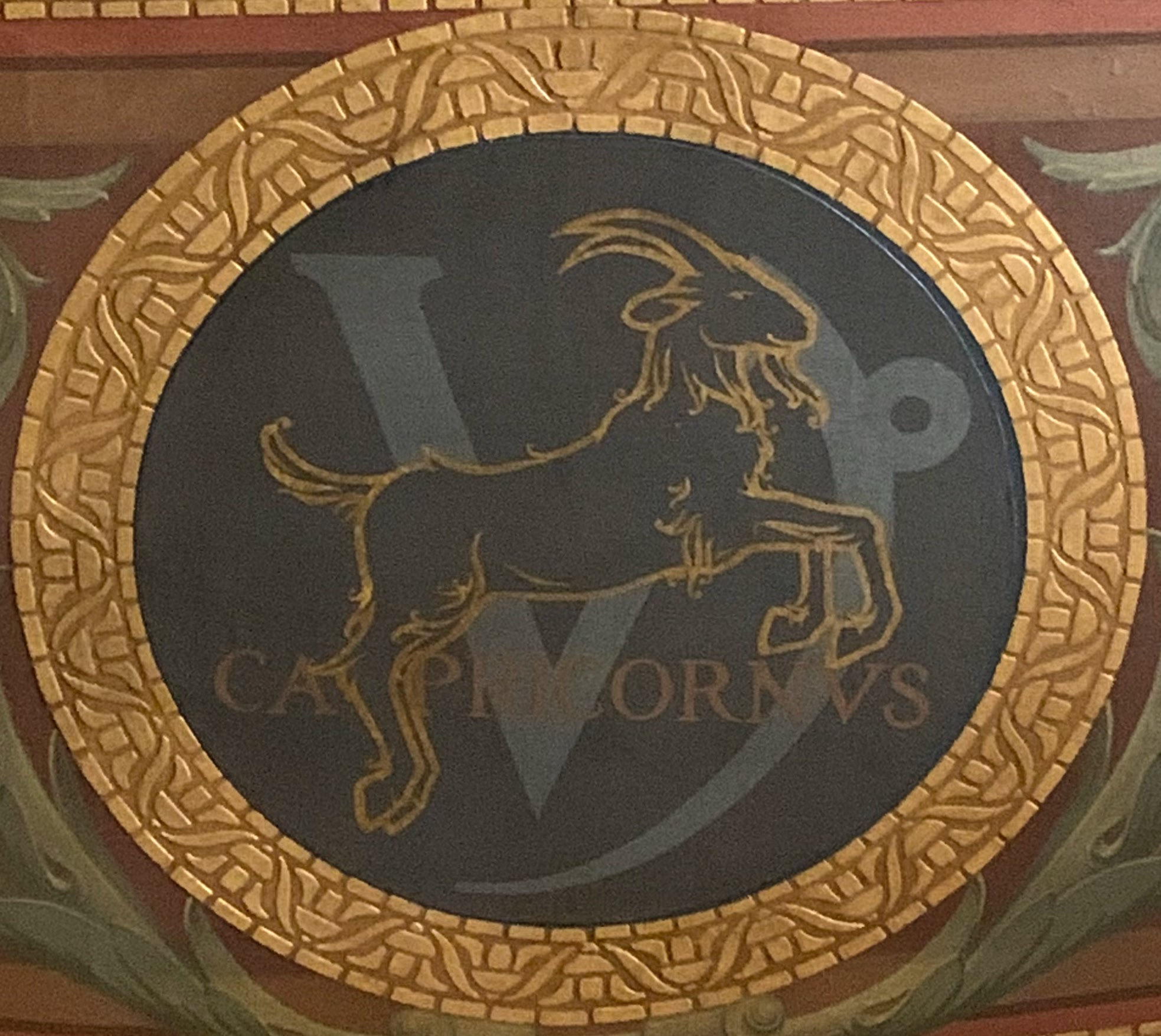
Capricornus at the Wisconsin State Capitol

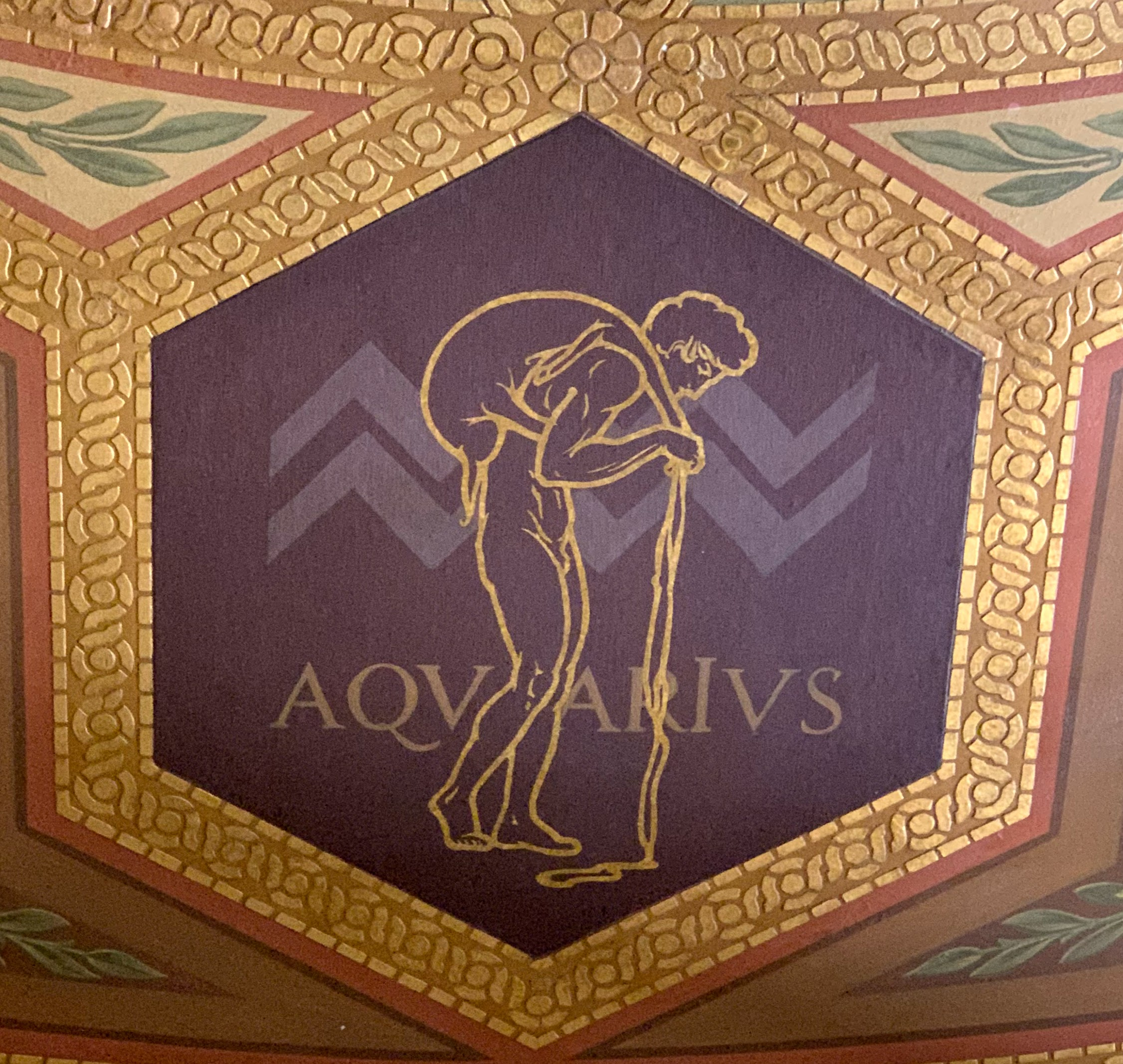
Aquarius at the Wisconsin State Capitol

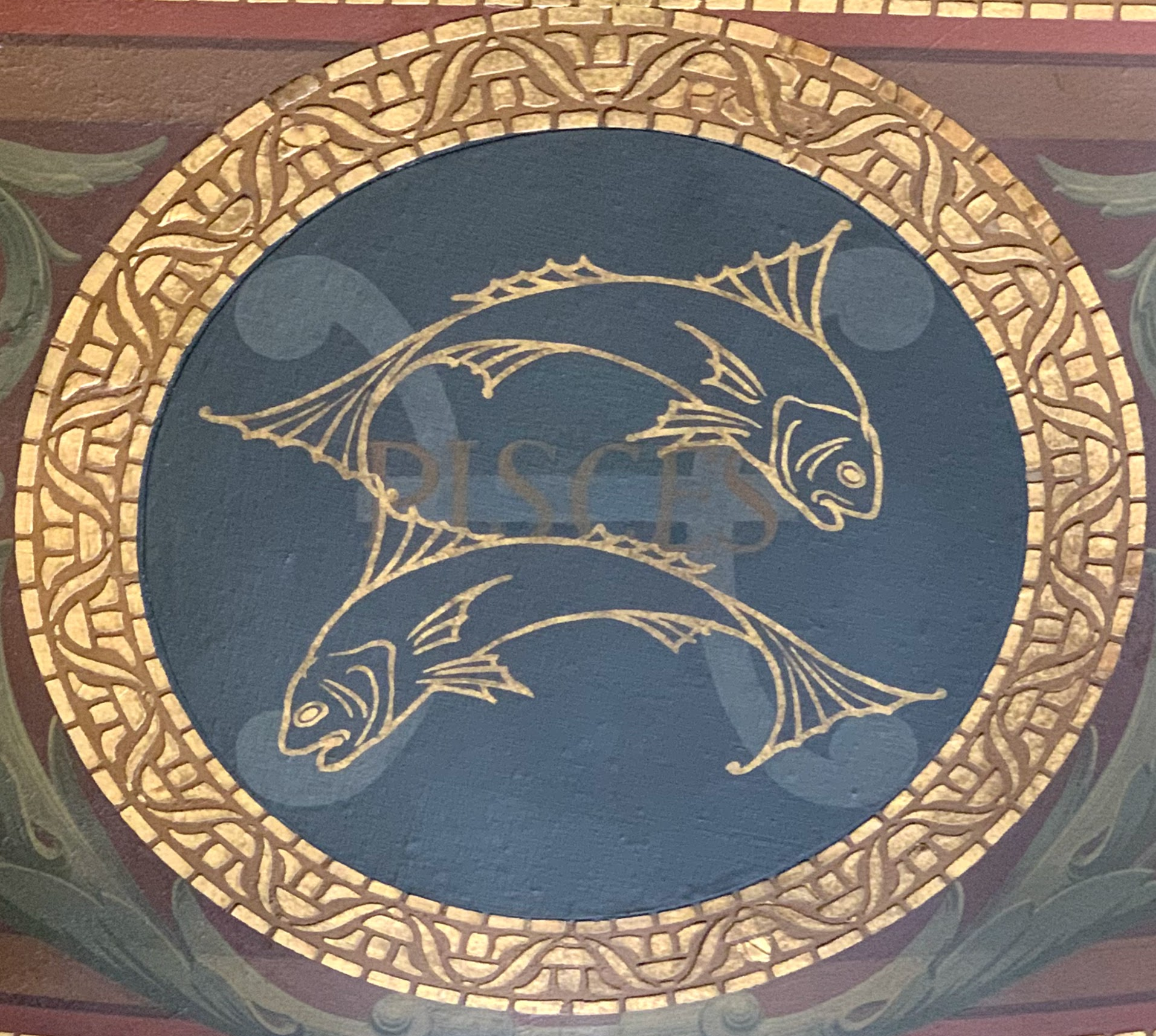
Pisces at the Wisconsin State Capitol

== Persian astrology ==
Persian astrology, particularly during the Sasanian era and earlier, is considered one of the most important connecting links in the history of global astronomy and astrology. This scientific school was a combination of Babylonian, Indian, and Greek knowledge that developed within the context of Iranian culture. The Sasanian Empire, by establishing scientific centers such as the Academy of Gondishapur, became a hub for the translation and compilation of astronomical and astrological texts. Important texts from Sanskrit and Greek were translated into Middle Persian (Pahlavi). Sasanian astrologers played a fundamental role in developing concepts such as continuous historical astrology and the great conjunction cycles of Jupiter (Ohrmazd) and Saturn (Kewan), which were used to predict major political events and the fates of kingdoms.

Many astrological concepts found in specialized texts today have their roots in Middle Persian and found their way into Latin through Arabic translations, including:

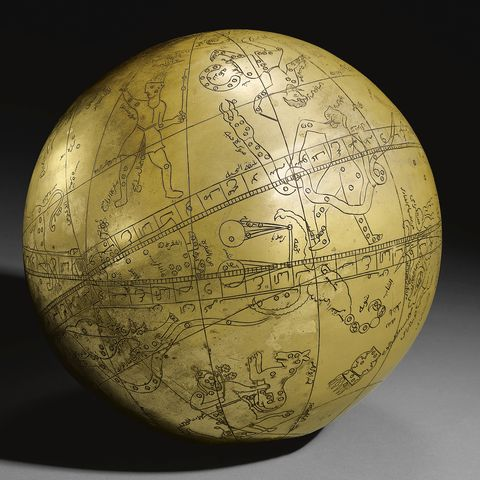
Large Persian Brass Celestial Globe with an ascription to Hadi Isfahani and a date of 1197 AH/ 1782-3 AD of typical spherical form, the globe engraved with markings, figures and astrological symbols.

- Hyleg: A word with Persian roots that was widely used in Sasanian astrology. It means "the fountain of life," and Persian astrologers also called it "Kadbanu". The hyleg represents the human body in a natal chart and is used to assess the quantity and quality of life.
- Kadkhodah: Composed of two parts, "kad" (house) and "khodah" (master). In astrology, it is the planet that has dignity in the position of the hyleg and represents the soul. A person's lifespan is calculated from the combination and blending of the hyleg and the kadkhodah.
- Jan-Bakhtar (Jan-Bakhshan): The distributor of the soul or the giver of life. The lord of the term (specific boundaries within the zodiac signs) to which the progression (tasyir) reaches is called "Qasim" in Arabic and "Jan-Bakhtar" in Persian.

The main role of Sasanian astrology in the transmission of knowledge was creating a bridge between ancient traditions and the Islamic era. Books such as the Anthology by Vettius Valens and the Carmen Astrologicum by Dorotheus of Sidon were first translated into Pahlavi, and later Persian scholars such as Abu Ma'shar al-Balkhi, Mashallah ibn Athari, and Naubakht translated this blended Persian-Greek-Indian knowledge into Arabic. This treasure then reached Europe through Al-Andalus and formed the foundation of Western astrology in the Middle Ages.

With the advent of Islam and the Arab conquest of Iran, heavy damage was inflicted on Iranian scientific resources and libraries. Libraries and centers holding Pahlavi documents in Ctesiphon and Khwarezm suffered destruction and looting. Many of the books of the Zoroastrian priests and scientific texts in the Pahlavi language were destroyed. In addition to the physical destruction caused by the war, the change of the scientific language from Middle Persian to Arabic caused many of the Sasanian astrological treatises that had not been destroyed to fall into oblivion over time due to a lack of readers and failure to be copied. Today, only their names or distorted translations remain in Arabic and Latin sources.

In the early Islamic era in Persia, the Persian scholar Al-Khwarizmi's Zīj al-Sindhind (c. 820 CE) laid the mathematical and computational foundations for later Islamic astrology. As one of the earliest precise zijes, it contained tables for the motions of the Sun, Moon, and the five known planets, together with trigonometric tables, calendrical calculations, and astronomical parameters required for astrological computations. By synthesizing Indian, Sasanian Persian, and Ptolemaic traditions, it became the prototype for many later zijes and exerted a lasting influence on both Islamic and medieval European astronomy and astrology.

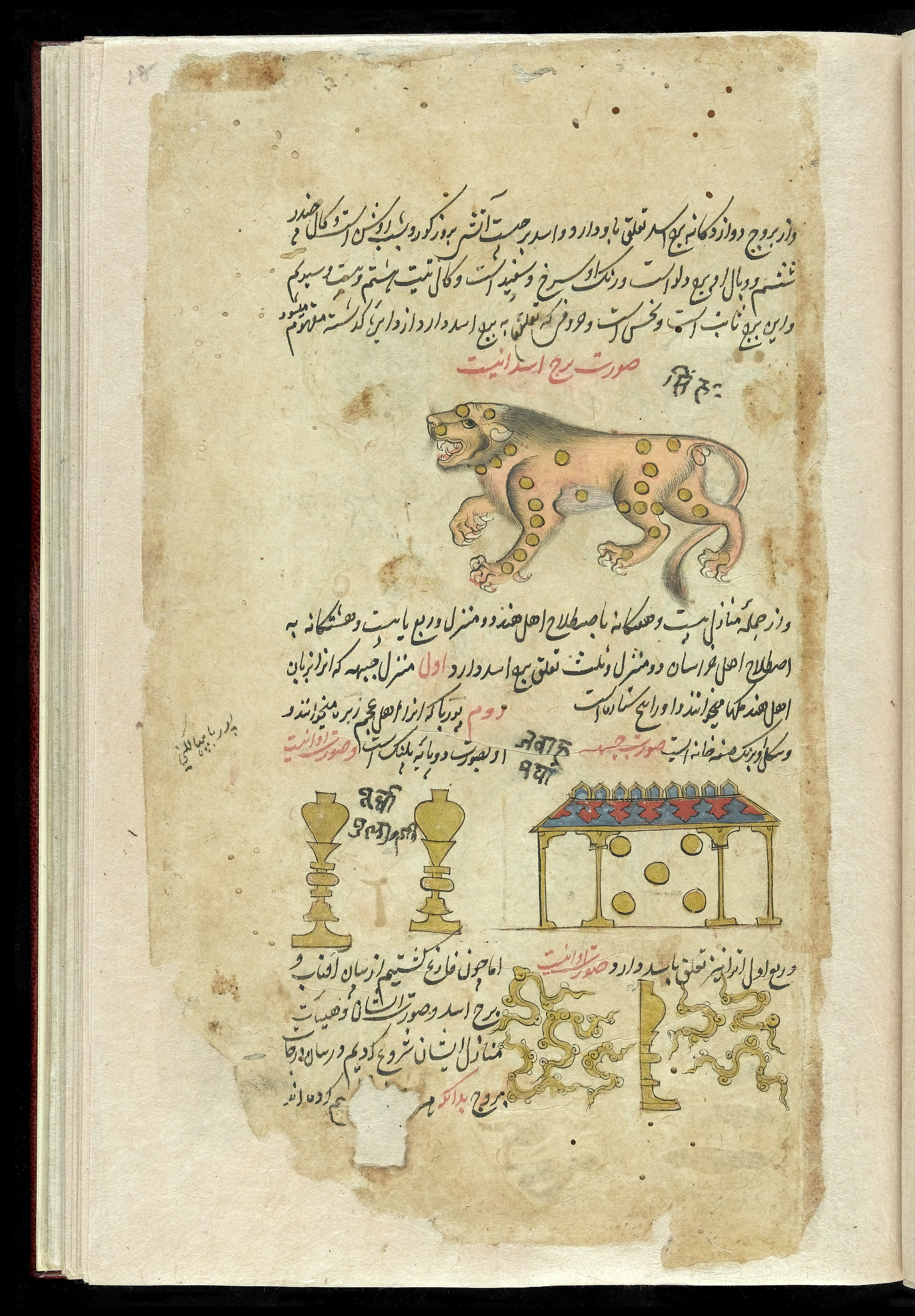
An example of the Persian manuscript writings on astrology, transferring the knowledge to the Islamic era.

Although al-Khwarizmi did not write a treatise on judicial astrology, his computational methods enabled the accurate determination of planetary positions, the Ascendant, astrological houses, and other parameters essential for casting horoscopes. Consequently, his historical importance to astrology lies primarily in providing its mathematical and astronomical infrastructure rather than in developing astrological doctrine. Many later Islamic zijes and astrological works, including those associated with Abu Ma'shar al-Balkhi, were built upon the computational tradition established by al-Khwarizmi.

== Indian astrology ==
In Indian astrology (Jyotiṣa), the cosmological framework is based on the Pancha Mahābhūta, the five great elements: Fire (Agni), Earth (Pṛthvī), Air (Vāyu), Water (Jala), and Ether (Ākāśa). The master of fire is Mars, while Mercury is of land, Saturn of air, Venus of water, and Jupiter of ether.

Each of the five visible planets (excluding Sun and Moon) is associated with one of these elements as its ruling principle:

- Mars (Maṅgala) is the ruler of Fire (Agni)
- Mercury (Budha) rules Earth (Pṛthvī)
- Saturn (Śani) governs Air (Vāyu)
- Venus (Śukra) rules Water (Jala)
- Jupiter (Bṛhaspati) governs Ether (Ākāśa)

Jyotisha recognises twelve zodiac signs (Rāśi), that correspond to those in Western astrology. The relation of the signs to the elements is the same in the two systems.

=== Nakshatras ===
A nakshatra (Devanagari: नक्षत्र, Sanskrit nakshatra, a metaphorical compound of naksha- 'map/chart', and tra- 'guard'), or lunar mansion, is one of the 27 divisions of the sky identified by prominent star(s), as used in Hindu astronomy and astrology (Jyotisha). "Nakshatra" in Sanskrit, Kannada, Tulu and Tamil and Prakrit refers to stars themselves.

== Chinese zodiac signs ==
Chinese astrological signs operate on cycles of years, lunar months, and two-hour periods of the day (also known as shichen). A particular feature of the Chinese zodiac is its operation in a 60-year cycle in combination with the Five Phases of Chinese astrology (Wood, Fire, Metal, Water and Earth). Nevertheless, some researches say that there is an obvious relationship between the Chinese 12-year cycle and zodiac constellations: each year of the cycle corresponds to a certain disposal of Jupiter. For example, in the year of Snake Jupiter is in the Sign of Gemini, in the year of Horse Jupiter is in the Sign of Cancer and so on. So the Chinese 12-year calendar is a solar-lunar-jovian calendar.

=== Zodiac symbolism ===
The following table shows the twelve signs and their attributes.

Symbols in Chinese zodiac astrology
Sign	Yin/Yang	Direction	Season	Fixed Element	Trine
Rat	Yang	North	Mid-Winter	Water	1st
Ox	Yin	North	Late Winter	Earth	2nd
Tiger	Yang	East	Early Spring	Wood	3rd
Rabbit	Yin	East	Mid-Spring	Wood	4th
Dragon	Yang	East	Late Spring	Earth	1st
Snake	Yin	South	Early Summer	Fire	2nd
Horse	Yang	South	Mid-Summer	Fire	3rd
Sheep	Yin	South	Late Summer	Earth	4th
Monkey	Yang	West	Early Autumn	Metal	1st
Rooster	Yin	West	Mid-Autumn	Metal	2nd
Dog	Yang	West	Late Autumn	Earth	3rd
Pig	Yin	North	Early Winter	Water	4th

=== The twelve signs ===
Chart showing the 24 cardinal directions and the symbols of the sign associated with them.

In Chinese astrology, the zodiac of twelve animal signs represents twelve different types of personality. The zodiac traditionally begins with the sign of the Rat, and there are many stories about the Origins of the Chinese Zodiac which explain why this is so. When the twelve zodiac signs are part of the 60-year calendar in combination with the four elements, they are traditionally called the twelve Earthly Branches. The Chinese zodiac follows the lunisolar Chinese calendar and thus the "changeover" days in a month (when one sign changes to another sign) vary each year. The following are the twelve zodiac signs in order.

1. 子 Rat (Yang, 1st Trine, Fixed Element Water): Rat years include 1900, 1912, 1924, 1936, 1948, 1960, 1972, 1984, 1996, 2008, 2020, 2032. The Rat also corresponds to a particular month in the year. The hours of the Rat are 11pm – 1am.
2. 丑 Ox (Yin, 2nd Trine, Fixed Element Earth: Ox years include 1901, 1913, 1925, 1937, 1949, 1961, 1973, 1985, 1997, 2009, 2021, 2033. The Ox also corresponds to a particular month in the year. The hours of the Ox are 1am – 3am.
3. 寅 Tiger (Yang, 3rd Trine, Fixed Element Wood): Tiger years include 1902, 1914, 1926, 1938, 1950, 1962, 1974, 1986, 1998, 2010, 2022, 2034. The Tiger also corresponds to a particular month in the year. The hours of the Tiger are 3am – 5am.
4. 卯 Rabbit (Yin, 4th Trine, Fixed Element Wood): Rabbit Years include 1903, 1915, 1927, 1939, 1951, 1963, 1975, 1987, 1999, 2011, 2023, 2035. The Rabbit also corresponds to a particular month in the year. The hours of the Rabbit are 5am – 7am.
5. 辰 Dragon (Yang, 1st Trine, Fixed Element Earth): Dragon years include 1904, 1916, 1928, 1940, 1952, 1964, 1976, 1988, 2000, 2012, 2024, 2036. The Dragon also corresponds to a particular month in the year. The hours of the Dragon are 7am – 9am.
6. 巳 Snake (Yin, 2nd Trine, Fixed Element Fire): Snake years include 1905, 1917, 1929, 1941, 1953, 1965, 1977, 1989, 2001, 2013, 2025, 2037. The Snake also corresponds to a particular month in the year. The hours of the Snake are 9am – 11am.
7. 午 Horse (Yang, 3rd Trine, Fixed Element Fire): Horse years include 1906, 1918, 1930, 1942, 1954, 1966, 1978, 1990, 2002, 2014, 2026, 2038. The Horse also corresponds to a particular month in the year. The hours of the Horse are 11am – 1pm.
8. 未 Goat (Yin, 4th Trine, Fixed Element Earth): Goat years include 1907, 1919, 1931, 1943, 1955, 1967, 1979, 1991, 2003, 2015, 2027, 2039. The Goat also corresponds to a particular month in the year. The hours of the Goat are 1pm – 3pm.
9. 申 Monkey (Yang, 1st Trine, Fixed Element Metal): Monkey years include 1908, 1920, 1932, 1944, 1956, 1968, 1980, 1992, 2004, 2016, 2028, 2040. The Monkey also corresponds to a particular month in the year. The hours of the Monkey are 3pm – 5pm.
10. 酉 Rooster (Yin, 2nd Trine, Fixed Element Metal): Rooster years include 1909, 1921, 1933, 1945, 1957, 1969, 1981, 1993, 2005, 2017, 2029, 2041. The Rooster also corresponds to a particular month in the year. The hours of the Rooster are 5pm – 7pm.
11. 戌 Dog (Yang, 3rd Trine, Fixed Element Earth): Dog years include 1910, 1922, 1934, 1946, 1958, 1970, 1982, 1994, 2006, 2018, 2030, 2042. The Dog also corresponds to a particular month in the year. The hours of the Dog are 7pm – 9pm.
12. 亥 Pig (Yin, 4th Trine, Fixed Element Water): Pig years include 1911, 1923, 1935, 1947, 1959, 1971, 1983, 1995, 2007, 2019, 2031, 2043. The Pig also corresponds to a particular month in the year. The hours of the Pig are 9pm – 11pm.

=== The five elements ===
- Wood: The wood person has high morals, is self-confident, expansive and co-operative, with wide and varied interests and idealistic goals. The direction associated with Wood is East, and the season is spring, which makes it the fixed element for the animal signs Tiger and Rabbit.
- Fire: The fire person has leadership qualities, dynamic passion, and is decisive, self-confident, positive, and assertive. The direction associated with Fire is South, and the season is summer, which makes it the fixed element for the animal signs Snake and Horse.
- Earth: The earth person is serious, logical and methodical, intelligent, objective and good at planning. The direction associated with Earth is Center. The season for Earth is the changeover point of the four seasons. It is the fixed element for the animal signs Ox, Dragon, Goat and Dog.
- Metal: The metal person is sincere, has fixed values and opinions, is strong of will, and has eloquence of speech. The direction associated with Metal is West. The season for Metal is Autumn. It is the fixed element for the animal signs Monkey and Rooster.
- Water: The water person is persuasive, intuitive, and empathetic. The water person is objective and often sought out for their counsel. The direction associated with water is North. The season for Water is Winter. It is the fixed element for the animal signs Rat and Pig.

The five elements operate together with the twelve animal signs in a 60-year calendar. The five elements appear in the calendar in both their yin and yang forms and are known as the ten Heavenly Stems. The yin/yang split seen in the Gregorian calendar means years that end in an even number are Yang (representing masculine, active, and light), those that end with an odd number are Yin (representing feminine, passive and darkness), subject to Chinese New Year having passed.

== See also ==
- Influence of seasonal birth in humans
- Chinese zodiac
- Glossary of astrology
