= Hyleg =

Term in Hellenistic astrology

In astrology, the hyleg is the Persian-Arabic term for the planet with the greatest essential dignity in five important natal chart positions (according to Ptolemy's Tetrabiblos):

- the degree of the Sun
- the degree of the Moon
- the Ascendant
- the Lot of fortune
- the pre-natal syzygy (that is, New Moon or Full Moon, whichever preceded the birth.)

Some ancient authorities (viz. Vettius Valens) used slightly different chart positions to obtain the hyleg.

The word "hyleg" also appears in Chamber's Dictionary (1999) with the definition stating "the ruling planet at time of birth". The word derives from the Middle Persian word "hîlâk" meaning "nativity".

== Note ==
1. Claudius Ptolemy. Tetrabiblos. Greek work from ca. 150 A.D. Various English translations. The Loeb Library translation by F.E. Robbins is available on the web See section III, Chapter 10.
