= Redshirting (academic) =

Postponing entrance into kindergarten

Redshirting is the practice of postponing entrance into kindergarten of age-eligible children in order to allow extra time for socioemotional, intellectual, or physical growth. In the United States, this also refers to creating laws that set cutoff dates slightly before the new year in order to "redshirt" children born in the later part of the calendar year (often September to December) for the same purposes. This occurs most frequently where children's birthdays are so close to the cut-off dates that they are very likely to be among the youngest in their kindergarten class. In the US, more boys than girls are redshirted due to sex-based differences in neurological development.

== Etymology ==
Redshirting originated as a term for a similar activity but occurring in college sports rather than kindergarten, where a redshirt was "a high-school or college athlete kept out of varsity competition for one year to develop skills and extend eligibility" and originated "from the red shirts worn in practice by such athletes". The term is an Americanism from circa 1950–1955.

== Incidence of redshirting ==
In the United States, the National Center for Education Statistics (NCES) reports that academic redshirting occurs at the rate of about 9% per year among kindergarten-age children, according to surveys from 1993 and 1995. Although modern data suggests this may be inflated, as studies have found only around 4-6% of children are redshirted. The change has been even larger in first grade: over a period of forty years, the proportion of six-year-olds in first grade went from 96% to 84%. Redshirting has traditionally been more common in affluent communities and for children attending private schools, although some scholars speculate that there may have been a recent increase in certain public school districts. According to NCES, boys are more likely to be redshirted than girls, and children born in the latter third of the year (September to December) are five times more likely to be redshirted than those born in the earlier months of the year. The NCES report also shows that white, non-Hispanic children are more than twice as likely as black, non-Hispanic children to have entered kindergarten later than their birthdays allowed.

Redshirting may be a response to demands for a higher level of school readiness. In a United States national survey published in 1998, teachers indicated that 48% of their students were not ready for the current kindergarten curriculum. High percentages of teachers indicated that half of their students lacked important skills, including "following directions" (46%), "academic skills" (36%), and the ability to "work independently" (34%). In light of such data, many scholars suggest that academic curricula are not appropriate for young children.

== Effects ==
Research on redshirting suggests that while some advantages may accrue in the short term, these advantages dissipate by the end of elementary school, and may be replaced by deleterious effects in the long term. Some studies have examined the effects of redshirting that occur immediately or within the early elementary years. Others have examined its long-term effects. Proponents and opponents of redshirting often use the same evidence but reach opposite conclusions. A recent survey of evidence indicates that academic advantages accrue to students who are young for their year, the converse of redshirting. This conclusion continues to be validated in more recent analyses. It is therefore unclear whether redshirting solves problems of school readiness.

=== Immediate effects ===
Research on academic redshirting suggests that, in the short term, redshirting (1) raises the child's academic achievement (math, reading, general knowledge) and conduct on par with or above that of younger classmates; (2) increases the child's confidence in social interactions and popularity among classmates; and (3) may simply add to the normal mix of ages and abilities within the classroom. However, there is also some speculation that, in classes where there are children who have been redshirted, some older children may feel alienated from their younger classmates, and some older classmates may have an unfair advantage over younger classmates in size and psychomotor and social skills. The presence of children of a wider age span may also make the class too diverse for a teacher to manage well.

=== Effects in grades 1–3 ===
Researchers have observed other effects of redshirting within the first three years of elementary school, including (1) academic achievement that is nearly equal to that of their grade-level peers, (2) a lower likelihood of receiving "negative feedback from teachers about their academic performance or conduct in class", and (3) less need for special education than classmates who were retained as kindergartners. However, there is also evidence that some first through third-graders who were redshirted as children required greater use of special education services than their non-redshirted and non-retained classmates.

=== Long-term effects ===
Proponents of redshirting often assert that there is no definitive evidence to show that redshirting harms children in the long term. Canadian journalist Malcolm Gladwell's Outliers discusses the long-term positive effect of redshirting in men's ice hockey, while an old-for-year advantage is not seen for many other sports, and appears to depend on intensive coaching of larger players in early childhood.

In the academic arena, advantages are seen not for older students, but for those who are young for their year. In a large-scale study at 26 Canadian elementary schools, first graders who were young for their year made considerably more progress in reading and math than kindergartners who were old for their year (but just two months younger). In another large study, the youngest fifth-graders scored a little lower than their classmates, but five points higher in verbal I.Q., on average, than fourth-graders of the same age. These studies are consistent with the idea that the source of increased opportunity in this case is school itself, with effects that are more favorable to students who are surrounded by children who are older than themselves.

One 1997 study found that adolescents whose school entry had been delayed exhibited more behavioral problems than their classmates. Moreover, in light of evidence of a higher use of special education services by redshirted youths, it has been speculated that many individuals who were redshirted as kindergarteners may have had special needs that were misdiagnosed as immaturity and that should have been treated by some form of direct intervention other than delayed entry.

Sam Wang and Sandra Aamodt focus on redshirting kindergartners in relation to sports, rather than parental appeals to emotional and academic maturity. "The practice, called redshirting—from the term for allowing college athletes to delay participation in sports to prolong their eligibility—also has a connection to children’s sports. As sports-minded parents know, physical maturity allows older children to perform better. Coaches often mistake this difference for natural aptitude and respond by giving the older children on their T-ball or soccer teams more opportunities to improve their skills. And those athletes tend to gain a lasting competitive advantage."

== See also ==
- Grade retention
- Early childhood education
- Social status
- Relative age effect
