= Influence of seasonal birth in humans =

Interactive heat map of ratios of births on each day of the year to the average, in USA (top) and England and Wales (bottom) [Legend and sources]

Seasonal variation in human birth rate has been found to be a nearly universal phenomenon. Also, birth seasonality has been found to be correlated with certain physiological and psychological traits of humans and animals and type I diabetes. Evidence for seasonality in humans is limited.

== Description ==
A ranking based on how many babies were born in the United States on that date between 1973 and 1999

== Findings ==
=== Influence on medical conditions ===
The season in which babies are born can have an effect on their future risk of developing neurological disorders like seasonal affective disorder, bipolar depression, and schizophrenia; as well as type I diabetes. Research has shown that the season of a baby's birth can have an effect on whether or not they will become a heavy smoker. Although the aspects of this effect differ by sex, the effect exists across both of them.

=== Large-scale population analytic studies ===
Recently, large-scale population analytics have allowed for the exploration of birth month/season hypotheses among large cohorts of people. One study used 1.7 million patients from Columbia University in New York City (NYC) to confirm associations between neurological conditions, respiratory condition and reproductive conditions with birth month. In addition, they uncovered an association between cardiovascular diseases and birth month. This was subsequently confirmed in a separate study, also using data from NYC. Researchers also explored mechanisms correlated with birth season in a large population study including data from 10.5 million patients, from three countries (US, South Korea, and Taiwan) and six study sites. They found correlations between relative age and school cutoff periods. And that first trimester exposure to fine air particulates increased the risk of atrial fibrillation later in life.

=== As a factor in academic development ===
There is evidence that suggests that children born earlier in an academic year gain an advantage over their later-born classmates:

"In Britain the academic year begins in September, and there may be almost a year's chronological age difference between the eldest (September birthday) and youngest (August birthday) children in the same class. There is evidence that, in this context, children born in the autumn term (September to December birthdays) perform better academically, relative to their class peers, than those born in the spring term (January to April birthdays), who in turn outperform those born in the summer term (May to August birthdays)."

=== As a suicide risk factor ===
Birth rates of people who later die by suicide show disproportionate excess for April, May and June compared with the other months. Overall, the risk of suicide increases by 17% for people born in the spring–early summer compared with those born in the autumn–early winter; this risk increase was larger for women (29.6%) than for men (13.7%).

Research works in Sweden show that those who preferred suicide by hanging rather than poisoning or petrol gases were significantly more likely to be born during February–April. Maximum of the month-of-birth curve for preferring hanging was for March–April and the minimum was for September–October.

However, other studies have shown that there is no effect of season of birth on psychological disorders, such as depression and anxiety.
