= Relative age effect =

Statistical bias

The distribution, according to month of birth, of players involved in UEFA organised international youth football tournaments in 2010/11

The distribution of births according to month in the general population

The term relative age effect (RAE), also known as birthdate effect or birth date effect, is used to describe a bias, evident in the upper echelons of youth sport and academia, where participation is higher amongst those born earlier in the relevant selection period (and lower for those born later in the selection period) than would be expected from the distribution of births. The selection period is usually the calendar year, the academic year or the sporting season.

The difference in maturity often contributes to the effect, with age category, skill level and sport context also impacting the risk of the relative age effect. Mid to late adolescent, regional to nation, popular sports seeing the highest risk, and under 11, recreational, unpopular sports seeing the lowest risk.

The terms month of birth bias and season of birth bias are used to describe similar effect but are fundamentally different. Season of birth examines the influence of different prenatal and perinatal seasonal environmental factors like sunlight, temperature, or viral exposure during gestation, that relate to health outcomes. Conversely, the relative age effect shifts with selection dates moving the advantage with the selection period. With influence from social agents, children born soon after the cut-off date are typically included, and a child born soon before the cut-off date excluded.

== In sport ==
Youth sport participation is often organized into annual age-groups. The IOC, FIFA and the six international football confederations (AFC, CAF, CONCACAF, CONMEBOL, OFC and UEFA) all use 1 January as their administrative cut-off which is most commonly used but, 1 September is used in the UK, like many other locations around the world. This grouping can be seen in the first graph showing the distribution of births, by month, for the European Union over the ten years from 2000 to 2009. The birth rate correlates closely with the number of days in a month with a slight increase in the summer months. The second graph, by the month, shows the birth distribution of over 4,000 players involved in the qualifying squads for U17, U19 and U21 tournaments organised by UEFA in 2010–11.A 2024 cross-sectional study published in Frontiers in Sports and Active Living examined the determinants of sports dropout among 6,783 Italian students aged 8 to 13. The researchers found that dropout rates peak around age 13, driven primarily by lack of time, difficulty reaching sports facilities, loss of enjoyment, and psychosocial pressures. The study also highlighted regional disparities, noting higher abandonment rates in Southern Italy compared to the North.

This declining distribution from the beginning of the year for professional athlete participation has been seen in sports like: association football, baseball, cricket, gymnastics, handball, ice hockey, rugby league, running, skiing, swimming, tennis, and the Youth Olympic Games, as well as non-physical sports like shooting.

Malcolm Gladwell's book Outliers: The Story of Success and the book SuperFreakonomics by Steven Levitt and Stephen Dubner, popularised the issue in respect of Canadian ice-hockey players, European football players, and US Major League baseball players.

=== Contributing factors ===
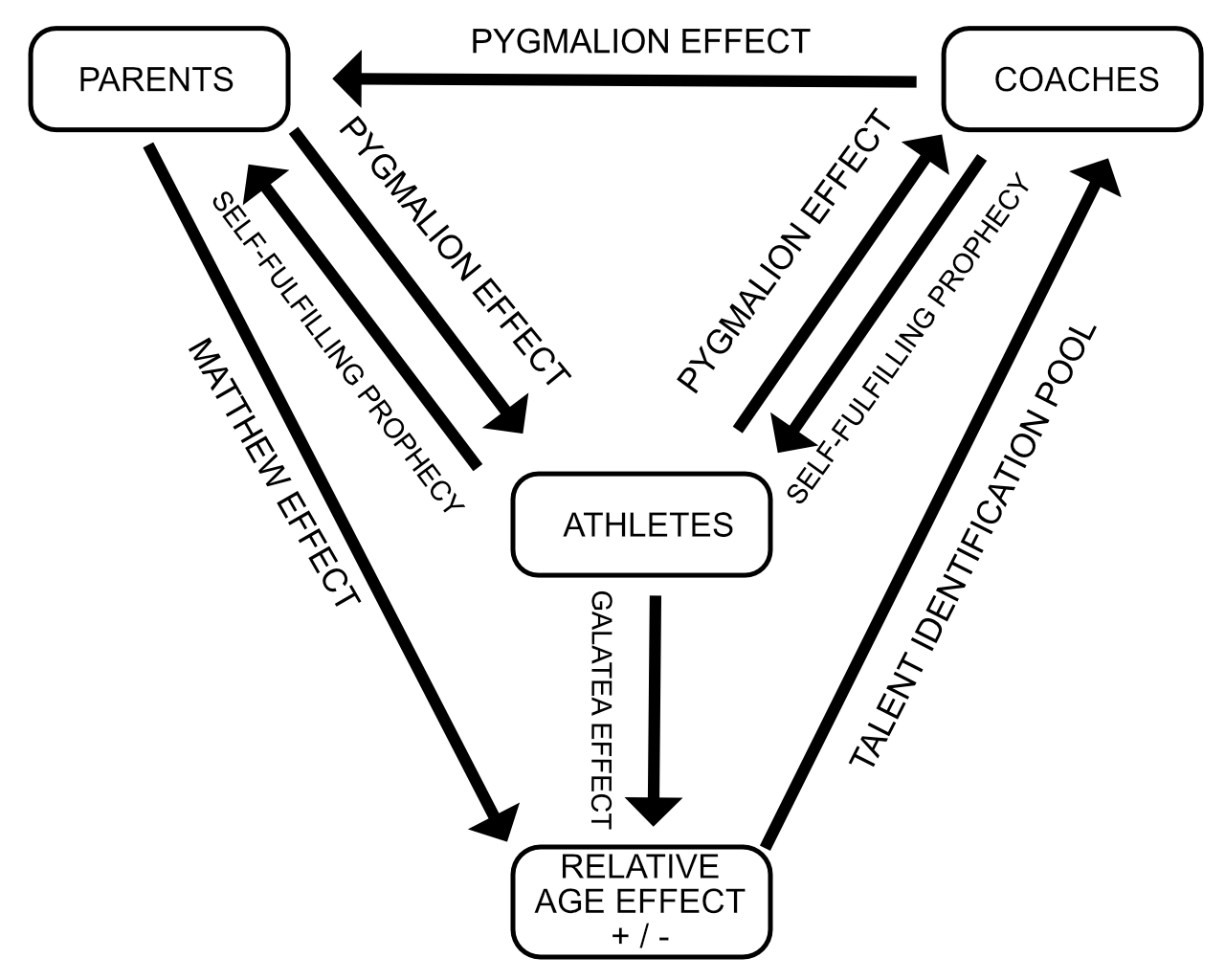
Theoretical model of the social agents which influence relative age effect

Relative age effects are caused by birthdate eligibility rules but can be affected by parents, coaches and athletes through other mechanisms. The Pygmalion effect, Galatea effect, and Matthew effect are examples of effects which impact player motivation.

In addition to these social factors contextual differences change the distribution with decreased effects in female sports, unpopular sports, at different ages, individual sports, or sports with a lower reliance on body size, with an expected increased effect in male sports, popular sports, or competitive sports. The sports popularity in a geographical or cultural area will affect the relative age distribution relative, with examples seen in volleyball and American football.

The early maturation levels giving physical advantages to first quarter individuals can create the bias, seen in players' height in basketball, dominant hand in tennis, or size in a cricket position, but physical size isn't always the cause. Older individuals also gain more competence and self-efficacy, increasing the performance gap. These advantages lead to increased dropout rates for Q1 births. However, the bias for sports where height and mass impedes flexibility, rotational speed and the strength to mass ratio, maturational delay may be preferred as seen in gymnastics.

With an adult group the relative age has the opposite meaning, as performance declines in age, and is more significant with more physically demanding sports, depending on what age the average peak performance level is, in that sport. The "underdog effect" has shown that those late birth individuals may see better chances if they are selected to play, with the advantage decreasing after selection.

Playing position, federation membership, and individual and team performance also contribute to the effect, with older players having a higher risk of injury.

=== Reducing the relative age effect ===
Various methods have been suggested and tested to reduce the relative age effect like moving the cut off dates, expanding the age group range, birthdate quotas for the players, the average team age (ATA) method for eligibility, or grouping by height and weight. Some methods have struggled to find success due to the effect moving with selection dates. Making the relative age known to the individuals in the environment have shown less bias in talent identification reducing the relative age effect.

Birthday banding, and re-calculating scores based on relative age, are other methods used to reduce the effects, with bio-banding seeing the most research, showing benefit to early and late maturing players, both in academy football and in recreational football. Bio-banding can help promote appropriate training loads and reduce injury risk, while increasing technical demands from players, however, sports already categorized by maturation metrics like Judo, may not see those effects. More longitudinal studies are needed, alongside more reliable ways to band individuals, as biological, psychological and social development doesn't progress in synchrony, creating different imbalances in the groups.

== In education ==
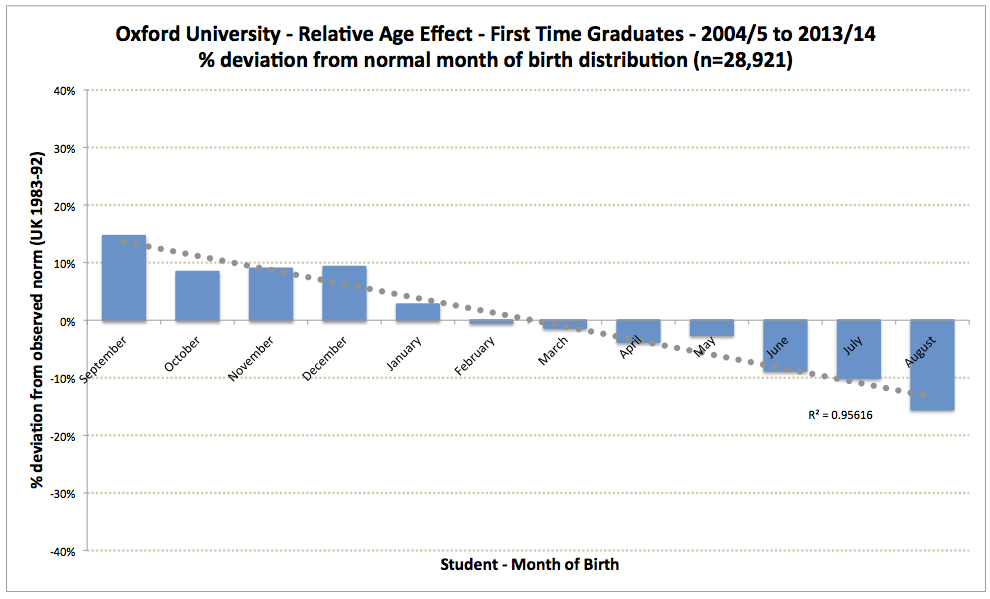
Oxford University RAE profile in aggregate 2004/5 to 2013/14

The Academic year is decided by education authorities with August or September being common cut-off dates in the Northern Hemisphere and February or March cut-off dates in the Southern Hemisphere. Many countries, especially in the Southern Hemisphere, use the calendar year as academic year, grouping children born in the same year together per grade.

The third graph illustrates the relative age effect in graduations from the University of Oxford over a 10-year period, which has also been seen in UK Nobel laureates.

The relative age effect and reversal effect are evident in education, with older students on average scoring higher marks, getting into more gifted and talented programs, and being more likely to attend higher education in academic schools over vocational schools, not necessarily due to higher intelligence. The Matthew effect again plays a role, as the skills learned early in education compound over time, increasing the advantage, with older students becoming more likely to take up leadership roles. However, like in sport, the effect diminishes over time after middle school, and those born later in the year perform better in university education.

== In leadership positions ==
A relative age effect has also been observed in the context of leadership. An over-representation starts in high-school leadership activities such as sports team captain or club president. Then in adult life, this over-representation has been observed in top managerial positions (CEOs of S&P 500 companies), and in top political positions, both in the USA (senators and representatives), and in Finland (MPs).

== Seasonal birth effect ==
Seasonal birth in humans varies, and alongside the relative age effect the epidemiology of seasonal births show over-representations in health conditions like ADHD and schizophrenia, with one study finding "that higher school starting age lowers the propensity to commit crime at young ages." However, other studies failed to replicate relative age effects on temperament, mood, or physical development.

Obesity has been linked to season of birth with increased chances, potentially due to surrounding temperature at birth, with winter and spring having the highest correlation, but physical inactivity is still a larger risk factor.

Summer babies have increased chances of specific learning difficulties, and winter and spring babies related to schizophrenia and mania/bipolar disorder. Schizoaffective disorder can be related to December–March births, major depression to March–May births, and autism to March births.

Increased rates in seasonal affective disorder relate to the influence of seasonal birth in humans.

== See also ==
- Attrition bias – Bias in a statistical analysis due to non-random selection
- Cherry picking – Fallacy of incomplete evidence
- Ecological fallacy – Formal fallacy in statistical interpretation
- Funding bias – Tendency of a scientific study to support the interests of its funder
- Modifiable areal unit problem – Source of statistical bias
- Modifiable temporal unit problem – Source of statistical bias
- Spectrum bias – Phenomenon in biostatistics
- Survivorship bias – Statistical error resulting from focusing on successes over failures
