= Stars in astrology =

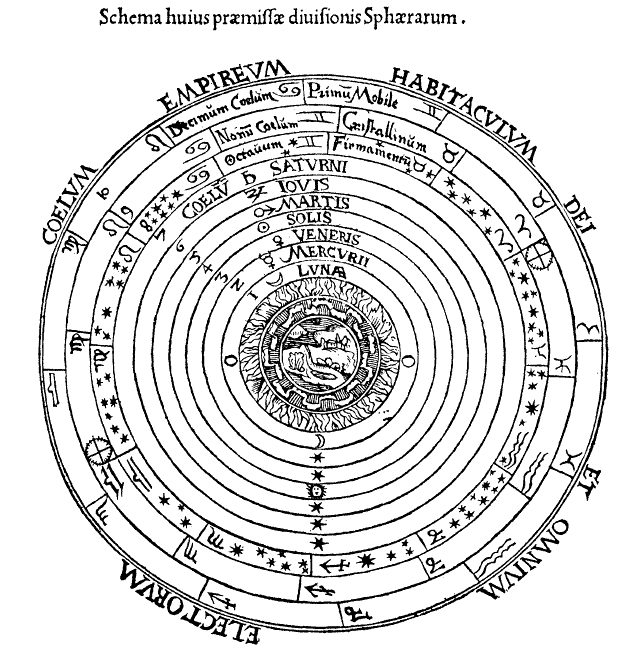
This diagram of the Ptolemaic solar system from Peter Apian's Cosmographia shows the "fixed stars" in the eighth heaven of the firmament, behind which is a ninth, crystalline heaven, and behind that, the primum mobile.

In astrology, certain stars are considered significant. Historically, all of the various heavenly bodies considered by astrologers were considered "stars", whether they were stars, planets, other stellar phenomena like novas and supernovas, or other solar system phenomena like comets and meteors.

== Fixed and wandering stars ==
In traditional astrological nomenclature, the stars were divided into fixed stars, Latin stellæ fixæ, which in astrology means the stars and other galactic or intergalactic bodies as recognized by astronomy; and "wandering stars" (Greek: πλανήτης αστήρ, planētēs astēr), which we know as the planets of the Solar System. Astrology also treats the Sun, a star, and Earth's Moon as if they were planets in the horoscope. These stars were called "fixed" because it was thought that they were attached to the firmament, the most distant from Earth of the heavenly spheres.

== Stars and astrological degrees ==
Certain of the astrological degrees were identified and known due to their association with a corresponding star. The astrological degrees that correspond to individual stars must be corrected for the precession of the equinoxes, and as such the astrologer must know when any given position of a fixed star was noted, to make the necessary corrections.

== Stars in sidereal and tropical astrology ==
In the broadest sense the many different types of astrological practice divide into two types: Sidereal astrology and tropical astrology. They differ in the positions of their respective divisions of the zodiac, but otherwise use the same positions of the planets, obtained either by observation or more often calculated and published in an astronomical ephemeris, such as the Astronomical Almanac.

Traditional Western astrology is based on tropical astrology, which presumes an equal division of the sky along the ecliptic into twelve seasonal zones, with the divisions between sections starting at the current location of the spring equinox rather than aligned to any particular constellations' stars. Each zone is called a sign, and given the name of the constellation which formerly occupied the corresponding ecliptic position c. 150 ce, starting with the sign Aries. The equinox was located at the western edge of the constellation Aries when western astrology was codified in the Tetra Biblos, but as a result of the precession of the equinoxes the positions of tropical astrology's zodiacal signs no longer overlap the constellations they were named for, because the starting point of the system of signs at the equinox has shifted west across nearly the entire constellation Pisces over the past two millennia, at a rate of about one constellation per 2 600 years. For example, the current start of the sign Aries begins in the western quarter of Pisces, far from its border with Aries to the east, and near Pisces' border with Aquarius to the west.

Sidereal astrology is more common in Asia, and orients to the current positions of selected station stars in zodiacal constellations (for example Spica, Antares, Aldebaran, and Regulus, among others). It is at once the oldest and a recently revived astrological tradition. Sidereal astrology uses the actual current positions of constellation's centers as its starting point, but separates them using traditional divisions of the zodiac constellations (rather than modern astronomical boundaries).

== Zodiac ==
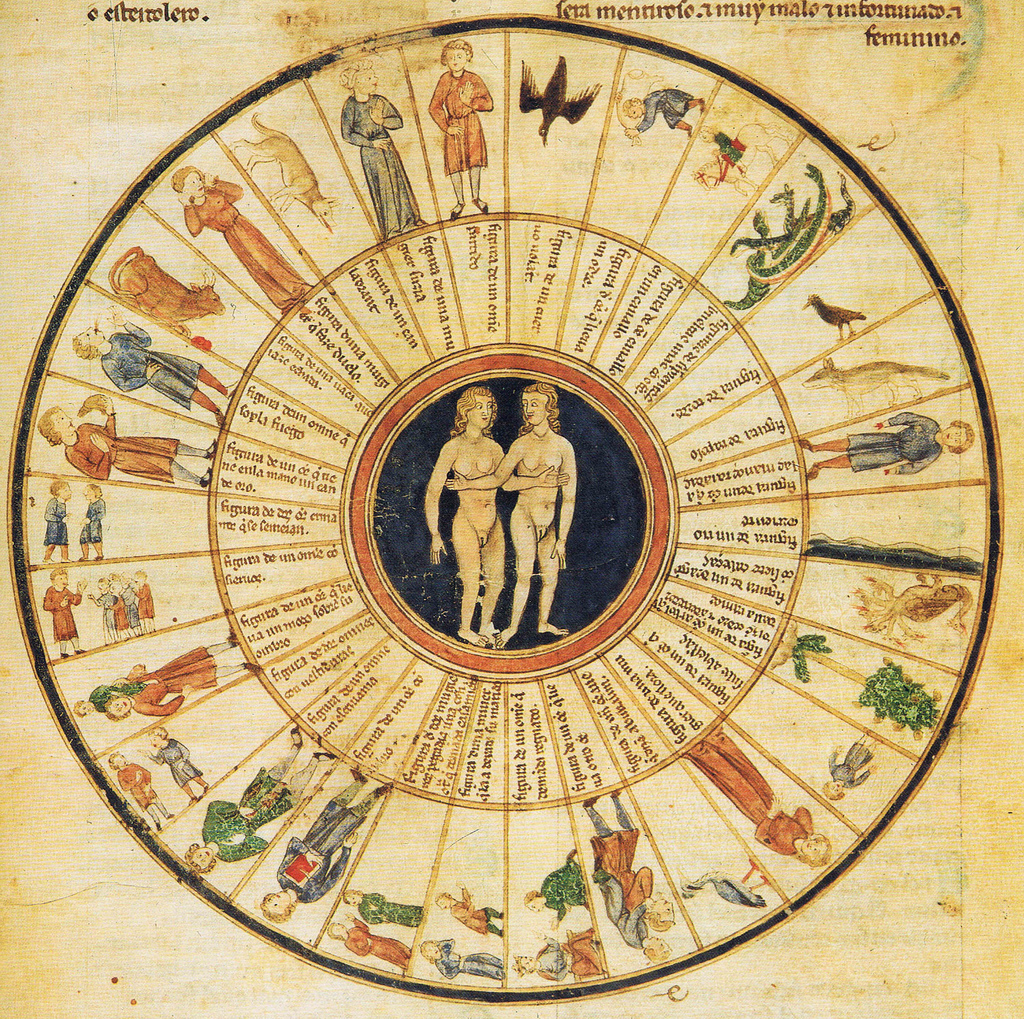
Paranatellonta: this manuscript illumination from an astrology text attributed to Alfonso X of Castile illustrates the effects of various stars and constellations, including Corvus, Cygnus, and Draco, when acting in concert with Gemini.

Traditionally, the most important fixed points in the heavens were described by the constellations of the zodiac. Ptolemy's account likens the influence of some of the stars in the zodiac constellations to the planets; he writes, for example, that "The stars in the feet of Gemini (Alhena and Tejat Posterior) have an influence similar to that of Mercury, and moderately to that of Venus."

== Non-zodiac constellations in astrology ==
Vivian E. Robson notes that many of the traditional constellations outside of the zodiac constellations occupy large degrees of arc and typically compass several of the tropical zodiac signs. Ptolemy referred to stars by reference to the anatomy or parts of the constellations in which they appeared; thus Arcturus he named the "right knee of Boötes". Most of the Western names of stars, such as Algol or Betelgeuse, are Arabic in origin. In 1603 the Augsburg lawyer and celestial cartographer Johann Bayer introduced the current Greek letter-based naming system for the brighter stars, in which easily seen stars are identified by their constellation names prefixed with a Greek letter roughly assigned in descending order of brightness. For example, Regulus is the brightest star in Leo, so it is catalogued as α Leonis – the first (brightest) star of the Lion; several sidereal astrological systems use Spica as their zodiac starting point, which is the brightest star in Virgo, hence α Virginis.

== Astrological meteors ==
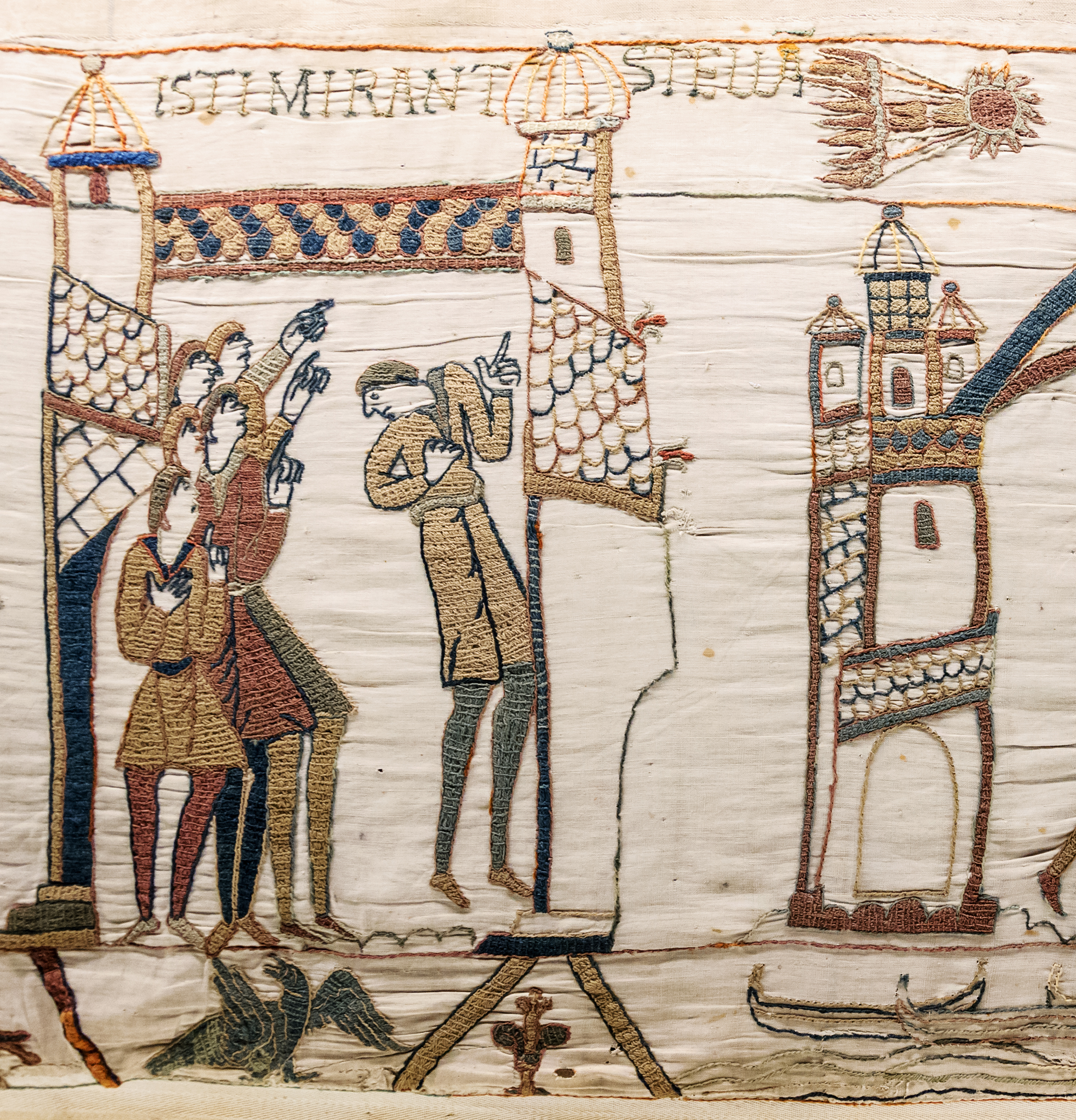
"Those people wonder at the star." The stitchers of the Bayeux Tapestry believed that the return of Halley's Comet related to the Norman Conquest of 1066.

Unpredictable observations in the heavens, including novas and supernovas as well as other phenomena in the heavens such as comets, meteors, parhelions, and even rainbows, were all collected under the name of astrological meteors. According to Ptolemy, variations in the magnitude of fixed stars portends wind from the direction in which the star lies. Etymologically, the word meteor describes any phenomenon in the heavens, and derives from the Greek μετέωρον (meteōron), signifying anything in the sky or above the earth; this is the shared origin of English words such as meteoroid and meteorology.

These astrological meteors were typically held to be omens that presaged major world events. In De nova stella, Tycho Brahe, one of many astrologers who observed the supernova of 1572, stated his belief that the appearance of the supernova heralded the decline of the Roman Catholic Church and stated that the years 1592-1632 would be impacted by the astrological influence of the supernova. The years corresponded almost precisely with the lifespan of Gustavus Adolphus (1594 - 1632), the king of Sweden who championed the cause of Protestantism during the Thirty Years War. This apparently successful prediction won Brahe international fame as an astrologer.

== Use ==
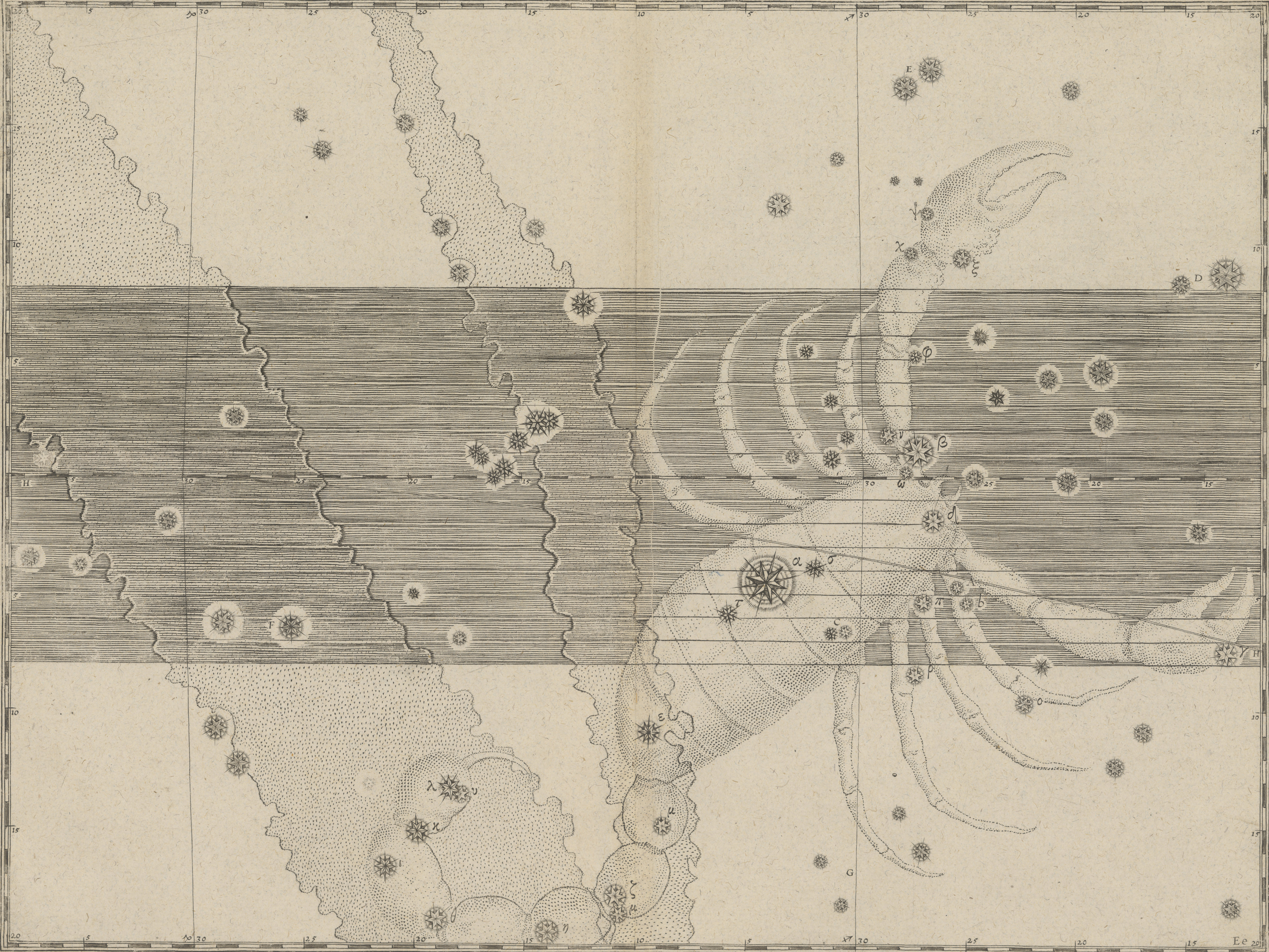
Scorpio, depicted in Johann Bayer's Uranometria. The bright star in the body of the scorpion, ᾳ Scorpii, is Antares.

According to Nicholas DeVore, while the fixed stars no longer are consulted much in natal astrology, they remain important in aspects of astrological divination such as judicial astrology. Those astrologers who include them in natal charts do not give a major star any significance unless it appears as part of a close conjunction with a birth planet, within 5° by celestial longitude, and 1° by latitude. They have no effect by means of aspect. A first magnitude or brighter star on the Ascendant or Midheaven in the horoscope may indicate celebrity. The two stars Aldebaran and Antares are said to produce stress when they transit one of the angles of the horoscope.

Some astrologers that consult the stars refer to their affects as paranatellonta, or "paran" for short. Paranatellonta are stars that fall upon one of the four angles of the horoscope (rising or setting, at the midheaven, or at the imum coeli) at the same time a significant planet is at one of those points. Thus, for example, if Sirius was rising while Jupiter was at the midheaven, Sirius would be considered a paran of Jupiter and could influence the way the astrologer interpreted Jupiter in that horoscope.

== Specific fixed stars ==
=== Aldebaran ===
Astrologically, Aldebaran is a fortunate star, portending riches and honor. This star, named "Tascheter" by the Persians, is one of the four "royal stars" of the Persians from around 3000 BC. These stars were chosen in such way that they were approximately 6 hours apart in right ascension. Each of these stars was assigned to a season, Aldebaran was prominent in the March sky and as such, it was associated with the vernal equinox.

In medieval astrology, Aldebaran is one of fifteen Behenian stars, associated with rubies, milk thistle and the sigil.

=== Algol ===
In astrology, Algol is generally considered an unfortunate star. Ptolemy referred to it as "the Gorgon of Perseus" and associated it with death by decapitation: mirroring the myth of the hero Perseus' victory over the snake-haired Gorgon Medusa. Historically, it has received a strong association with violence across a wide variety of cultures. Medieval Arabic commanders tried to ensure that no important battle began whilst the light of Algol was weak. Algol was connected to the prognoses in an ancient Egyptian calendar for lucky and unlucky days composed about 3200 years ago.

The 17th century English astrologer William Lilly regarded any planet to be afflicted when within five degrees of conjunction.

Algol is also one of the 15 Behenian stars, associated with the diamond and black hellebore, and marked with the sigil:

=== Procyon ===
Astrologically, Procyon is considered mostly unfortunate although it is sometimes wealth producing. It has strong potential as a cause of violence; it brings sudden success then disaster. It is of the nature of Mars (and also Mercury to a lesser extent), and when Mars is found conjoined to this star, the native with this configuration will often be an offender of mischief and violence, that is, if these stars are found upon one of the 4 angles of the chart, during the day, with the Moon making a testimony to them while increasing in light. It is also one of fifteen Behenian stars, associated with agate and water crowfoot. According to Cornelius Agrippa, its sigil is.

=== Sirius ===
In the astrology of the Middle Ages, Sirius is a Behenian star, associated with beryl and juniper. Its sigil was listed by Heinrich Cornelius Agrippa.

=== Vega ===
Vega (or Wega) takes its name from a loose transliteration of the Arabic word wāqi‘ meaning "falling". Its constellation (Lyre) was represented as a vulture or eagle so that Vega was referred to as the 'falling vulture/eagle'. This is a Pole star. Around 12,000 BC the pole was pointed only five degrees away from Vega and through precession, the pole will again pass near Vega around AD 14,000. Medieval astrologers counted Vega as one of the Behenian stars. and related it to chrysolite and winter savory. Cornelius Agrippa listed its sigil under Vultur cadens, a literal Latin translation of the Arabic name.

== See also ==
- Asteroids in astrology
- Planets in astrology
