= Bhāva =

"House" in Hindu astrology

Bhāv (Sanskrit: भाव, 'state, condition') is a term in Jyotish denoting a fixed zodiacal division of the sky from the perspective of an observer. It corresponds to the concept of "house" in Western astrology. A natal chart is called bhāvchakra (Sanskrit: chakra, 'wheel'.)

== Overview ==
In almost all traditional practice, the twelve houses (bhāv) of a chart have the same boundaries as the twelve signs in the chart; in other words, each sign is a house in the chart. The beginning of each house is the 0th degrees of the sign and the end is the 30th degree of the sign. What varies from chart to chart is the enumeration of these houses, i.e., which sign is the first house, which is the second, and so forth. This is determined by the position of the Lagna (the Ascendant, or the longitudinal point of the zodiac that was rising in the East at birth.) The house in which the Lagna falls is usually the first house of the chart, and the other houses follow it, counter-clockwise, in the sequence of the zodiac. It is possible, however, for the houses to be defined relative to some other factor, such as a planet, a sign, or any other factor.

Each of the twelve houses signifies a region of the concerns of life, and the identity of the sign of that house colors what may be expected from that life.

More than one system to align houses with signs are recognized in Jyotish. The most common method is described above, a method that Western astrologers call the whole sign house system; another is Sripathi, introduced by Sripati, akin to a Porphyry house system. The modern Krishnamurti Paddhati also incorporates a Placidus house system.

The principle of House Division introduced in Sripathi Bhāv System is described as follows: "In the Sripathi system the 1st house cusp is the Lagna, and the 7th house cusp is the Descendant opposite it, the 10th house cusp is at the MC (Medium Coeli or Madhya Lagna), i.e. Zenith, and the 4th house cusp is at the IC (Imum Coeli or Patala Lagna) i.e. Nadir. The four quarters divided thus should be divided into three equal parts each, and thus we find the 12 house cusps in Sripathi system. To find the Bhava Sandhis (meeting points of houses) we should divide the distance between the house cusps into halves."

== The houses ==
The names of the 12 houses and the areas of life represented by them are:

1. Lagna - Nature of Native, Appearance, Health, Character, Purpose of Life, behavior, birth, limbs, head
2. Dhan - Wealth, Family, Domestic Comforts, Early Education, Inheritance, Speech, moveable assets
3. Parakram - Younger Brothers and Sisters, Communication (Talking, Writing, Business Documents), Intelligence, fine arts Short Journeys, "great prowess (physical and mental)," hands, arms, shoulders
4. Suhrda - Mother, Emotions, Education, Home, Property and Land, Surrounding in Old Age, vehicles, the chest
5. Sut - Children, Lovers, Recreation Devotion, Speculation and Gambling, the belly, accumulated karma
6. Ripu/Roga - Diseases, Maternal uncle and aunt, Litigation, Servants, Mental Worries, Enemies, Foreigners, small intestine,
7. Kam - Spouse, Business Partner, Death, Respect, passion, groin
8. Mrtyu - Death & Longevity, Obstacles, Suffering, Sexual organs and sexual attractiveness, Occult, Dowry, Inheritance, Imprisonment, Excretory organs, accidents
9. Bhagya - Father, Luck, Higher learning, Philosophy & Religion, Mentor or Guru, Prosperity, Travel, "deeds of virtue"
10. Karm - Profession, Status & fame, Power, Father, Mother-in-law, Government, Clothes, Commerce, knees
11. Aay - Friends, Hopes, Earnings, Club or Social Activities, Elder Brothers and Sisters, Daughter/Son-in-law, calves, shins and ankles
12. Vyay - Expenses, Sleep (and convalescence), Sexual pleasures, Spirituality, Travel & Pilgrimage, Secret Enemies, Imprisonment, Hospitals, Asylums, Liberation, loss foreign residency, feet

== Classifications ==
In general, houses are classified into four categories:

- Kendra: the angular houses, that is the first, fourth, seventh and tenth houses. (kendra, from Greek κἐντρα, also describes the relationship between any houses or grahas which are about 90 degrees apart.) These are very strong houses for grahas to occupy.
- Trikon: the houses forming a triangle within the chart with the first house, about 120 degrees apart from one another, that is the first, fifth and ninth. These are the most auspicious houses. (From Greek τρἰγωνα.)
- Dusthān: the less fortunate houses which tend to rule unhappy areas. These houses make no clear geometric connection to the Lagna. Dusthanas include the sixth, eighth and twelfth houses.
- Upachay: "growth" or "remedial" houses, where malefic planets tend to improve, include the third, sixth, tenth and eleventh houses.

Succedent houses are called pāṇaphara (from Greek ἐπαναφοραἱ), and cadent houses are called āpoklima (Gk. ἀποκλἰματα).

In Indian Vedic astrology, also, the twelve houses are called Bhava. The houses are divided into four 'bhavs' which point to 'mood' or what the house stands for. These four bhavas are Dharma (duty), Artha (resources), Kama (desires) and Moksha (liberation). These bhavs are called 'purusharths or 'aims in life.' The ancient mystics of India realized that the austere path of the yogi was not for everyone. They found that each human existence has four worthwhile goals in life:

- Dharm – 1st, 5th and 9th Bhavas/Houses – The need to find our path and purpose.
- Arth – 2nd, 6th and 10th Bhavas/Houses – The need to acquire the necessary resources and abilities to provide for ourselves to fulfill our path and purpose.
- Kam – 3rd, 7th and 11th Bhavas/Houses – The need for desires and enjoyment.
- Moksh – 4th, 8th and 12th Bhavas/Houses – The need to find liberation and enlightenment from the world.

Theses 4 aims of life are repeated in above sequence 3 times through the 12 bhavas/houses:

- The first round, bhavs/houses 1 through 4, show the process within the Individual.
- The second round, bhavs/houses 5 through 8, show the alchemy between relating to Other people.
- The third round, bhavs/houses 9 through 12, show the Universalization of the self.

== See also ==
- Nakshatras
- Panchangam
- Dasha
- Gandanta
- House (astrology)

== Bibliography ==
- Hart deFouw and Robert Svoboda, Light on Life: An Introduction to the Astrology of India, Penguin, 1996
- Ronnie Gale Dreyer, Vedic Astrology: A Guide to the Fundamentals of Jyotish, Samuel Weiser, York Beach ME, 1997
- James T. Braha, Ancient Hindu Astrology for the Modern Western Astrologer, Hermetician Press, Hollywood FL, 1986
- David Pingree, Jyotiḥśāstra, Otto Harrassowitz, Wiesbaden, 1981
