= Mutual reception =

When planets are in each others signs

In astrology, mutual reception is when two planets are in each other's signs of rulership.

== Definition and applications ==
Two planets are in mutual reception when they are in each other's signs (for example Mercury is in Aries and Mars is in Gemini). If the condition of each planet in mutual reception is strong, they will strengthen and provide assistance to one another. Some modern astrologers believe they will also take on some of each other's attributes.

Whenever planets are in mutual reception, they provide the native with additional forces to overcome difficulties that present themselves during transits affecting their signs and houses. Ancient astrologers called this condition "exchange of signs," and it was but one example of various forms of astrological reception, that is, assistance provided by one planet for another one which falls in signs where the first planet has dignity.

However, there are conditions where this helpful relationship is much weakened:

- If one of the planets is in a sign of its detriment or fall, it is not likely to have the resources to be of much assistance to the planet it rules;
- If the condition of one or both of the planets is otherwise impaired—such as by being placed in a sign that does not aspect the Ascendant sign (for example, the twelfth house), or retrograde, or combust or under the beams (that is, within fifteen degrees of the Sun), it will similarly be of less use to the planet it receives, in proportion to how poorly it is positioned;
- If the two planets are not in astrological aspect to one other (that is, the signs in which they are placed are not in sextile, trine, square or opposition angles to one another, the condition of mutual reception will be much less forceful, since there is no connection between the two planets in which this mutuality can be effected. Furthermore, if the aspect between the two signs is one of opposition, the planets will both be opposite their signs of rulership, which is the definition of being in detriment, and hence both will be too weak to be of much help to the other.

For example, in a chart where Mercury is in Capricorn and Saturn is in Virgo, a strong mutual reception is in effect. Mercury is located in Capricorn, Saturn's domicile, or rulership, and Saturn is found in Mercury's sign of rulership and of exaltation, Virgo. The two signs are in trine to one another, and hence have a strong working relationship. In this instance, the individual with these placements would be likely to demonstrate a powerful, logical mind, with excellent ability to reason and strong habits of organization, as well as the likelihood of being a very hard-working, focused thinker. The relationship brings out the best attributes of Saturn's powers of organization and dedication and Mercury's facility of mind. Furthermore, transits affecting Mercury adversely would be mitigated by Saturn's strengths, and Saturn might be able to come to Mercury's rescue. Mercury might have the same function in the case of an adverse transit to Saturn.

If an individual has the Sun posited in Aquarius and Saturn located in Leo, both the Sun and Saturn are in mutual reception, since the Sun's own house is in Leo, where Saturn is located, and Saturn governs the sign of Aquarius, where the Sun is positioned. However, in this example, since the signs of Leo and Aquarius are opposed to one another in aspect, the mutual reception may be of little value. Located opposite their own houses, in the signs of their detriment, both planets have little dignity, and without other very strong placement factors to compensate for this, the mutuality is probably not a factor in the individual's life

Similarly, with Venus in Virgo and Mercury in Libra, there is inherently a weakness in the mutuality of the relationship. Venus in Virgo is in fall, and can provide little support for Mercury, although Mercury, if otherwise powerful and well-positioned (for example in the first house or tenth house), may be helpful to Venus. But the relationship is further impaired by the fact that the signs Virgo and Libra are in aversion to one another—that is, they are not in aspect—and hence there is no easy way for these two planets to work together.

Mutual reception is not limited to exchange of the signs of dignity of rulership. Ancient and medieval astrologers gave equal force to mutuality obtained by planets being in each other's signs of exaltation—for example, Jupiter in Taurus in a chart where the Moon is in Cancer. Jupiter is exalted in the sign of Cancer; Moon is exalted in the sign of Taurus. This is a very powerful mutual reception, not only because Taurus and Cancer are in a sextile aspect to one another, but also because the Moon is also in its own house in Cancer. This placement would tend to give a notably generous and probably religious individual, with a good deal of luck and talent.

Ancient and medieval astrologers also considered mutual reception by triplicity rulerships, and by terms or bounds rulerships. Even mutual reception by face was considered, although, unlike the other four dignities, of very little overall impact. Furthermore, "mixed" mutual reception is also taken into account—for example, when one planet is in the sign of another planet's exaltation, and the second planet is at the same time in the sign of the first planet's rulership.

== See also ==
- Astrological reception

== Footnotes ==
1. However, for Hellenistic astrologers, the signs Virgo and Libra do have a connection of sorts to one another; they are contra-antiscia—that is, they are equally distant to the Aries/Libra equinoctial axis. What this means, practically, is that they have the same ascensional times. The ancients sometimes called signs that are thus positioned "like-ascending," and considered that there was a working relationship between them—perhaps not as strong a relationship, however, as signs more directly related, such as by trine, square or sextile aspect. A similar connection would pertain when signs share the same ruling planet, or if they were in antiscia to one another—that is, if two signs are the same distance from the solsticial Cancer/Capricorn axis. In this case, planets were considered to have similar relationships to the houses of the Sun and Moon. This connection did not pertain in mutual reception, however, for Medieval astrologers.
