= Arabic geomancy =

Type of geomantic divination

Arabic geomancy is a type of geomantic divination which involves interpreting a series of figures formed by a randomized process that involves recursion, followed by analyzing them, often augmented with astrological interpretations. Geomancy was considered by figures such as Richard II to be a broader discipline that also included philosophy, science, and alchemic elements.

== History ==
The sixteen geomantic figures.

The word "geomancy", from Late Greek *γεωμαντεία *geōmanteía translates literally to "earth divination"; it is a calque translation of the Arabic term ‛ilm al-raml, or the "science of the sand". Earlier Greek renditions of this word borrowed the Arabic word raml ("sand") directly, rendering it as rhamplion or rabolion. Other Arabic names for geomancy include khatt al-raml and darb al-raml.

The original names of the figures in Middle Eastern geomancy were traditionally given in Arabic, excluding a Persian origin. The reference in Hermetic texts to the mythical Ṭumṭum al-Hindi potentially points to an Indian origin, although Stephen Skinner thinks this unlikely. Having an Arabic origin is most likely, since the expansive trade-routes of Arabian merchants would facilitate the exchange of culture and knowledge.

European scholars and universities began to translate Arabic texts and treatises in the early Middle Ages, including those on geomancy. Isidore of Seville (c. 560 – 636) lists geomancy with other methods of divination – including pyromancy, hydromancy, aeromancy, and necromancy – without describing its application or methods. It could be that Isidore of Seville was listing methods of elemental scrying more than what is commonly known as geomancy. The poem Experimentarius attributed to Bernardus Silvestris, who wrote in the middle of the 12th century, was a verse translation of a work on astrological geomancy. One of the first discourses on geomancy translated into Latin was the Ars Geomantiae of Hugh of Santalla (fl. early 12th century). By this point, geomancy must have been an established divination system in Arabic-speaking areas of Africa and the Middle East.

Other translators, such as Gerard of Cremona (c. 1114 – 1187), also produced new translations on geomancy that incorporated astrological elements and techniques that were, up until this point, ignored. From this point on, more European scholars studied and applied geomancy, writing many treatises in the process. Henry Cornelius Agrippa (1486–1535), Christopher Cattan (La Géomancie du Seigneur Christofe de Cattan (1558)), and John Heydon (1629 – c. 1667) produced oft-cited and well-studied treatises on geomancy, along with other philosophers, occultists, and theologians until the 17th century, when interest in occultism and divination began to dwindle due to the rise of the Scientific Revolution and the Age of Reason.

Geomancy underwent a revival in the 19th century, when renewed interest in the occult arose due to the works of Robert Thomas Cross (1850–1923) and of Edward Bulwer-Lytton (1803–1873). Franz Hartmann published his text, The Principles of Astrological Geomancy, (English translation: 1889) which spurred new interest in the divination system. Based on this and a few older texts, the Hermetic Order of the Golden Dawn (founded in 1887) began the task of recollecting knowledge on geomancy along with other occult subjects, with them, Aleister Crowley (1875–1947) published his works that integrated various occult systems of knowledge. However, due to the short time the members of the Golden Dawn desired to learn, practice, and teach the old occult arts, many elaborate systems of divination and ritual had to be compressed, losing much in the process. In effect, they had reduced geomancy from a complex art of interpretation and skill in recognizing patterns to looking up predefined answers based on pairs of figures.

Like other systems of divination, geomancy has mythological associations. According to one Arabic Hermetic text, Idris (or Hermes Trismegistus) witnessed the angel Jibril in a dream. Idris asked for enlightenment, and Jibril proceeded to draw a geomantic figure. Upon being asked what he was doing, Jibril instructed Idris in the geomantic arts. Keeping this secret, he sought out Ṭumṭum al-Hindi, an Indian king, who then wrote a book on geomancy. This book was passed down through clandestine circles into the hands of Khalaf al-Barbarĩ, who traveled to Medina and was converted to Islam by Muhammad. Saying he knew a divinatory art, he explained that pre-Islamic prophets knew geomancy, and that by learning geomancy, one may "know all that the prophet knew".

Another mythological story for the origin of geomancy also involves Idris. After praying to God that He give Idris easily a means to earn his living, Idris rested one day, bored and without work, and began to draw figures idly in the sand. As he did so, a stranger appeared before him and questioned what he was doing. Idris replied that he was simply entertaining himself, but the stranger replied that he was doing a very serious act. Idris became incredulous and tried to deny this, but the stranger explained the significance of the meaning of the figure Idris drew. He then commanded Idris to draw another figure, and upon doing so the stranger explained the meaning and significance of that figure.

The pair continued this until Idris had discovered and understood the sixteen figures. The stranger then taught Idris how to form the figures in a regular manner and what the results meant, teaching him how to know things that could not be known with just the physical senses. After testing Idris' newfound knowledge and skill of geomancy, and revealing himself to be the angel Jibril in the process, the stranger disappeared. Idris, thankful to God and His messenger that he had learned this art, never revealed the art to anyone. Before he was risen to God, he wrote a book describing the art as Jibril had taught him, and from his successors.

Other tablets and records from antiquity identify Idris with the prophets Daniel or with Enoch. This was done in order to give geomancy a legitimate standing as a gift and skill from God, especially since one of the prophets had practiced it. However, those who argued against geomancy, such as Ibn Khaldun in his Muqaddima (1377), countered that it was a pre-Islamic system of knowledge, and that all such epistemologies were rendered obsolete with the revelation of the Qur'an.

Throughout the evolution and migration of geomancy, various tales and plays incorporated aspects of the art into their stories. In one story in One Thousand and One Nights, both the African Magician and his brother use geomancy to find Aladdin in order to do him harm. Geomancy's first mention in print came in William Langland's Piers Plowman where it is unfavorably compared to the level of expertise a person needs for astronomy ("gemensye [geomesye] is gynful of speche"). In 1386 Chaucer used the "Parson's Tale" to poke fun at geomancy in Canterbury Tales: "What say we of them that believe in divynailes as …geomancie…". Shakespeare and Ben Jonson were also known to use geomancy for comic relief. Dante Alighieri's Divine Comedy (early 14th century) makes a passing reference to geomancy. In the first two stanzas of Canto XIX in the Purgatorio,

It was the hour when the diurnal heat

no more can warm the coldness of the moon, vanquished by earth, or peradventure Saturn,

When geomancers their Fortuna Major see in the orient before the dawn

rise by a path that long remains not dim...

— Dante Aligheri, referencing the Greater Fortune (Fortuna Major) and the Way ("the path")

== Generating geomantic charts ==
A shield chart. The Mothers are, right to left, Via, Acquisitio, Conjunctio, and Laetitia. While the Reconciler is not pictured, it would be Amissio in this case.

Geomancy requires the geomancer to create sixteen lines of points or marks without counting, creating sixteen random numbers. Without taking note of the number of points made, the geomancer provides the random mechanism needed for most forms of divination. Once the lines are produced, the geomancer marks off the points two by two until either one or two points remain in the line; mathematically, this is the same as producing two dots if the number is even or one dot if the number is odd. Taking these leftover points in groups of four, they form the first four geomantic figures, and form the basis for the generation of the remaining figures. Once this is done, the "inspired" portion of the geomantic reading is done; what remains is algorithmic calculation.

Traditionally, geomancy requires a surface of sand and the hands or a stick, but can be done equally well with a wax tablet and stylus or a pen and paper; ritualized objects may or may not be desired for use in divination. Often, when drawing marks or figures, geomancers will proceed from right to left as a tradition from geomancy's Arabic origins, although this is by no means mandatory. Modern methods of geomancy include, in addition to the traditional ways, computerized random number generators or thrown objects; other methods including counting the eyes on potatoes. Some practitioners use specialized cards, with each card representing a single geomantic figure; in this case, only four cards are drawn after shuffling. Specialized machines have also been used to generate full geomantic charts.

The figures are entered into a specialized table, known as the shield chart, which illustrates the recursive processes reminiscent of the Cantor set that form the figures. The first four figures are called the matres, or Mothers, and form the basis for the rest of the figures in the chart; they occupy the first four houses in the upper right-hand corner such that the first Mother is to the far right, the second Mother is to her left, and so on (continuing the right-to-left tradition).

The next four figures, the filiae, or Daughters, are formed by rearranging the lines used in the Mothers: the first Daughter is formed by taking the first line from the first, second, third, and fourth Mothers in order and rearranging them to be the first Daughter's first, second, third, and fourth lines, respectively. The process is done similarly for the second Daughter using the second line from the Mothers, and so on. The Daughters are placed in the next four houses in order on the same row as the Mothers.

After the eight matres and filiae are formed, the four nepotes (or Nieces) are formed by adding those pairs of figures that rest above the houses of the respective Niece. Therefore, the first and second Mothers add to form the first Niece, the third and fourth Mothers add to form the second Niece, and so on. Here, addition involves summing the points in the respective lines of the parents: if the sum is an even number, then the resulting figure's line will have two points, and if the sum is odd then the line will have one point. Conceptually, this is the same procedure in mathematical logic as the exclusive or, where a line with two points is used instead of "false" and a line with one point instead of "true".

From the four nepotes, the two testes (or Witnesses) are formed in the same manner as the nepotes: the first and second Nieces form the Right Witness, and the third and fourth Nieces form the Left Witness. From the Witnesses, using the same addition process, the iudex, or Judge, is formed. A sixteenth figure, the Reconciler or superiudex, is also generated by adding the Judge and the First Mother, although this has become seen as extraneous and a "backup figure" in recent times.

== Interpreting charts ==
The shield chart most likely provided an early visual guide to generating the figures, and the interpreted answer would center on the fifteenth and sixteenth figures, the Judge and Reconciler. Skilled geomancers observe the whole chart, interpreting (among other things) meanings of the figures based on where they place in the chart, the numerical significance of the total points, and the similarities produced by added figures. Generally, the Judge represents the answer to the question, the Right Witness describes the querent's side of the query, the Left Witness represents the quesited's side, and the Reconciler represents the effect of the outcome (or Judge) upon the querent. The skilled geomancer can deduce root causes to the situation, hidden influences, the outcome and its aftermath, and general trends and events in the querent's life through interpreting the chart.

Another method of evaluating a geomantic chart involves taking the total sum of all points from 16 figures within the shield chart. In order to evaluate how quickly the queried situation would resolve, Pietro d'Abano suggested that the total sum be compared to the sum of all points in the sixteen geomantic figures, which is 96. If the sum of the chart is 96, then the resolution of the query will be "swift, and neither slow nor doubtful;" in other words, that all things that could be acted upon in the situation described by the query would resolve without delay nor ahead of schedule. If the sum is less than 96, then it will resolve quickly, and in a degree proportional to the difference between 96 and the total. Conversely, if the sum is more than 96, then it will resolve slowly.

The house chart corresponding to the shield chart above; the Mothers, Daughters, and Nieces are in order, counterclockwise, starting at the centre-left position. The Witnesses, Judge, and Reconciler are not shown.

European geomancers provided an alternate method of interpreting the figures through the house chart, which feature the twelve astrological houses. Here, they assign the figures from the shield chart to the houses in the house chart; the order used differs between different circles of occultists. While European geomancers still used the shield chart to generate the figures and provide most answers, they augmented geomancy with astrological techniques in the house chart. Based upon the query, they could provide a deeper insight into the querent's life, factors shaping the query itself, and the extent of the situations involved. They took note when several houses shared the same figure; as this figure passes from one house to the next, it generally indicates that the same situation or event affects each of those houses.

Pietro d'Abano discusses the primary modes of perfection used in geomantic interpretations with significators in his geomancy essay. In astrological geomancy, the significators are chosen based upon the identity of the querent and the identity of the quesited. Generally, except when the querent asks about a situation about a subject with no immediate connection to themselves, the querent's significator is located in the first house (see Derivative house).

The quesited's significator is identified based upon the focus of the query: this is based upon the relation of the query to the astrological houses. Some questions require more than two significators, such as in a query involving several primary factors (e.g., two parties quarrelling over an estate). Queries that have a yes-or-no, or possible-impossible, answer can easily be answered with these modes of perfection. If the chart perfects, the answer is "yes". Otherwise, in the case of denial of perfection, "no".

The nature of the figures themselves should also be considered. If a chart perfects with negative figures, for instance, the matter will resolve but the querent may not like the result. On the other hand, if the chart does not perfect but the figures are good, then the matter will not resolve even though the querent can make do successfully without it.

| Mode of perfection | Interaction of the figures | Interpretation |
|---|---|---|
| Occupation | The querent's significator and the quesited's significator are the same figure. | A natural connection between querent and quesited. The matter will resolve by the querent's own nature without extra effort. |
| Conjunction | One of the significators moves to a house directly beside the house of the other significator. | The querent and quesited meet each other. The significator that moves shows which party must work to attain the resolution: if the querent's significator moves to the quesited's, then the querent will need to work for the resolution. Otherwise, the quesited will work things out without need from the querent. |
| Mutation | The two significators appear next to each other elsewhere in the chart. | The resolution will come by some unexpected or unusual manner. Try new avenues that wouldn't normally be expected. |
| Translation | The same figure appears in houses directly beside the houses of the significators. | The resolution will come through a third party. A mediator will help bridge the gap between the querent and quesited. |
| Denial | No connection exists between the two significators. | The lack of perfection in a chart. The querent and quesited cannot reach each other. No resolution. |

In addition to modes of perfection, geomancers often took note of aspects between those figures that passed to other houses, and especially ones that made aspects to the significators. Often, when a chart denied perfection, geomancers would observe how the significators aspected each other; the aspects here retain similar meanings from astrology.

Christopher Cattan advocates using the strength of the astrological houses in determining the resolution. By observing the nature of the figures (good or ill, depending on the query) and what type of house they fall in (angular, succedent, or cadent), he judges the total effect of the figures on the query. The figures that fall in cadent houses have little to no effect, those that fall in succedent houses have a transient effect, and those that fall in angular houses have the strongest and most lasting effect upon the query.

Other examples of astrological technique used in geomancy include assigning zodiacal rulerships to the geomantic figures, linking geomantic figures to parts of the body based on zodiacal rulers, and assigning planetary spirits, intelligences, and genii to the figures based on their ruling planets.

== Geomancy and mathematics ==
The four binary elements of each figure allow for 16 different combinations, each called a tableau. As each chart is generated from the four Mothers, there are a total number of 16^{4}, or 65,536, possible charts. Due to the mathematics of the chart, only figures that have an even number of points total can become Judges; each of the eight Judges then has 8,192 charts associated with it. Traditional practitioners of geomancy use this knowledge as a type of parity check on the chart to ensure that no mistakes have been made while computing the figures.

In each chart, if all sixteen figures are observed (the four Mothers, the four Daughters, the four Nieces, the Witnesses, Judge, and Reconciler), at least two of the figures must be the same. As the Reconciler is usually termed an optional figure, 16 combinations of Mother figures can yield a chart where the Mothers, Daughters, Nieces, Witnesses, and Judge are all unique.

Populus cannot appear in these charts, since mathematically it either requires two figures to be the same in order to be formed, or produces a duplicate figure when added to another figure. In such charts, the Judge will always be one of Conjunctio, Amissio, Carcer, or Acquisitio. The sixteen combinations of Mothers, in order from the First to the Fourth Mother, are

- Puer, Caput Draconis, Tristitia, Albus
- Conjunctio, Puella, Fortuna Major, Tristitia
- Puella, Puer, Tristitia, Albus
- Puella, Cauda Draconis, Tristitia, Albus
- Rubeus, Laetitia, Puella, Puer
- Rubeus, Laetitia, Cauda Draconis, Puella
- Rubeus, Laetitia, Cauda Draconis, Caput Draconis
- Rubeus, Laetitia, Caput Draconis, Puer
- Acquisitio, Puella, Albus, Fortuna Major
- Laetitia, Fortuna Minor, Puer, Conjunctio
- Laetitia, Fortuna Minor, Acquisitio, Cauda Draconis
- Cauda Draconis, Caput Draconis, Tristitia, Albus
- Caput Draconis, Amissio, Fortuna Major, Tristitia
- Caput Draconis, Carcer, Albus, Fortuna Major
- Fortuna Minor, Rubeus, Puer, Amissio
- Fortuna Minor, Rubeus, Carcer, Cauda Draconis

== Unicode ==
Unicode supports the 16 geomantic symbols in the Miscellaneous Symbols Supplement block at code points 1CEE0..1CEEF.
