= Kundali =

Kundali may refer to:

- Kuṇḍali, one of the five major Wisdom Kings in Buddhism
- Kundali River, in Maharashtra, India
- Kundali (TV series), a 2000–2001 Indian soap opera
- Kundali, a birth chart in Hindu astrology
- "Kundali", a song from the 2018 Indian film Manmarziyaan
- Kundali, Indian term for horoscope, or birth chart, or natal chart

== See also ==
- Kundalini (disambiguation)
