= Combust =

Combust can refer to:

- Combust (astrological aspect), the obscuring of the unassisted viewing of a planet by the Sun's light
- Combustion, the exothermic chemical reaction
