= Kundalini (disambiguation) =

Kundalini is a spiritual energy in yogic philosophy.

Kundalini may also refer to:

- Yoga-kundalini Upanishad, the secret doctrine of Kundalini Yoga (Vedic Yoga Philosophy)
- Kundalini yoga, schools of yoga

== See also ==
- Kundali (disambiguation)
- Kundalini: The Evolutionary Energy in Man, the 1967 autobiography of Pandit Gopi Krishna
