= Kundali (astrology) =

Indian term for birth chart or horoscope

Kuṇḍali (also called janmapatra) is the Indian term for the astrological chart or diagram representing the positions of the navagraha-s of Indian astrology at a particular moment like the moment of the birth of a child. The navagraha-s are the Sun, Moon, Mercury, Venus, Mars, Jupiter and Saturn, and the two nodes of the Moon. The nodes of the Moon are the points on the celestial sphere where the orbit of the Moon intersects the orbit of the Sun. At a particular moment the navagraha-s will be at different points in the sky and they will be located in one of the 12 zodiacal signs (rāśi-s in Indian astrology), namely:

1. Meṣa (Aries), 2. Vṛṣabha (Taurus), 3.Mithuna (Gemini), 4. Karka (Cancer), 5. Siṃha (Leo), 6. Kanyā (Virgo), 7. Tulā (Libra), 8. Vṛścika (Scorpio), 9. Dhanuṣa (Sagittarius), 10. Makara (Capricorn), 11. Kumbha (Aquarius), 12. Meena (Pisces)

A kuṇḍali will show diagrammatically which one of the navagraha-s are located in which one of the rāśi-s at a particular moment. A kuṇḍali has twelve cells to represent the 12 zodiacal signs. Practitioners of astrology in different parts of India follow different conventions regarding the exact form in which the kuṇḍali is constructed. Essentially there are three different ways in which these cells are represented in a kuṇḍali, the one followed by people of South India, the one followed by people of North India and the one followed by people of Eastern India (West Bengal and Odisha).

The practice of constructing a kuṇḍali per se is not unscientific or pseudo-science as the kuṇḍali is only a diagram depicting the positions in the zodiac of the nine entities called the navagraha-s at a particular moment of time, and the navagraha-s are associated with true astronomical entities. But, the practice of "reading" a kuṇḍali and interpreting or using it to predict the future events or the personality traits of individuals, has no scientific basis and is a pseudo-science.

A kuṇḍali reflects planetary positions at birth, hand lines are believed to change over time, symbolically representing personal growth, choices, and experiences, offering another perspective alongside astrology.

== The different types of kuṇḍali-s ==
In astrology, the ascendant, lagna or rising sign at a specified moment (like the moment of birth of a child) is the rāśi on the eastern horizon at that particular moment. The ascendant is specific to a particular time and place. The kuṇḍali format followed in northern India is ascendant-centric in the sense that it gives primacy to the ascendant and assigns a fixed location to the ascendant. But, the kuṇḍali format followed in the southern and eastern India are rāśi-centric in the sense that they give primacy to the rāśi-s. In these formats, the various rāśi-s occupy fixed positions whereas the position of the ascendant changes depending on time and place.

=== The kuṇḍali in southern India ===
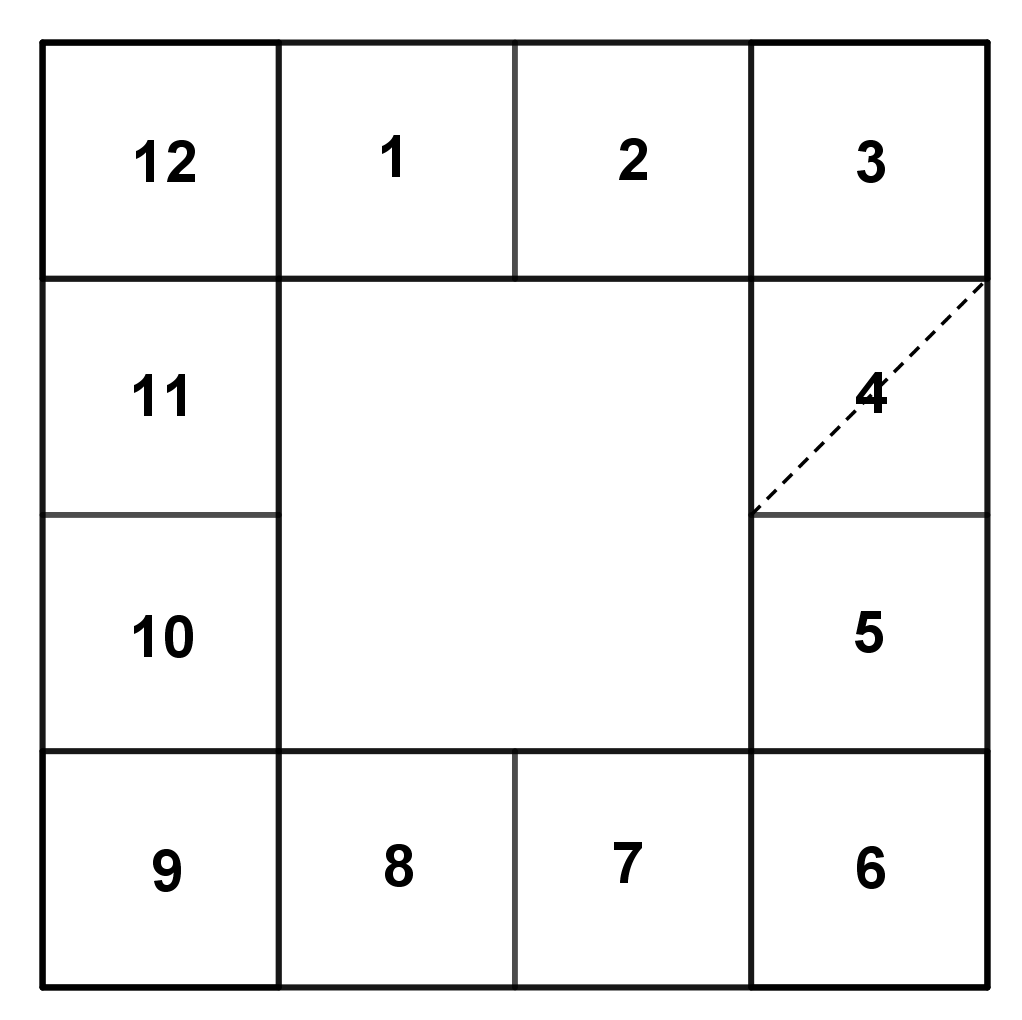
The kuṇḍali in southern India (numbers denote rāśi-s). The dashed line indicates that the ascendant is the fourth rāśi.

The kuṇḍali format followed in southern India is essentially a depiction of the zodiac exactly as it is laid out in the sky. The only difference is that instead of a circle a square is used and twelve smaller squares or cells are drawn inside the square to represent the rāśi-s. The earth may be imagined as situated at the center of the larger square. The rāśi-s are always in the same boxes. The Meṣa rāśi is in the second cell from the left in the top row of the diagram (marked 1 in the figure). The remaining rāśi-s are the remaining cells in the successive cells in the clockwise direction (marked 2, 3, 4, etc.).

The South Indian kuṇḍali is a rāśi-centric format. The navagraha-s are placed in the boxes corresponding to the rāśi-s in which they are located. The ascendant is marked in the appropriate box. It is denoted either by a diagonal line or by writing Lagna in the appropriate box.

One advantage of this chart format is that it more closely resembles the actual astronomy of the sky. Another advantage is that, since each rāśi has been allotted the same area in the chart, this chart is much easier to populate with names of the navagraha-s. As in the kuṇḍali formats of the other regions, there are no odd-shaped smaller sections that one has to squeeze the navagraha-s into.

=== The kuṇḍali in eastern India ===
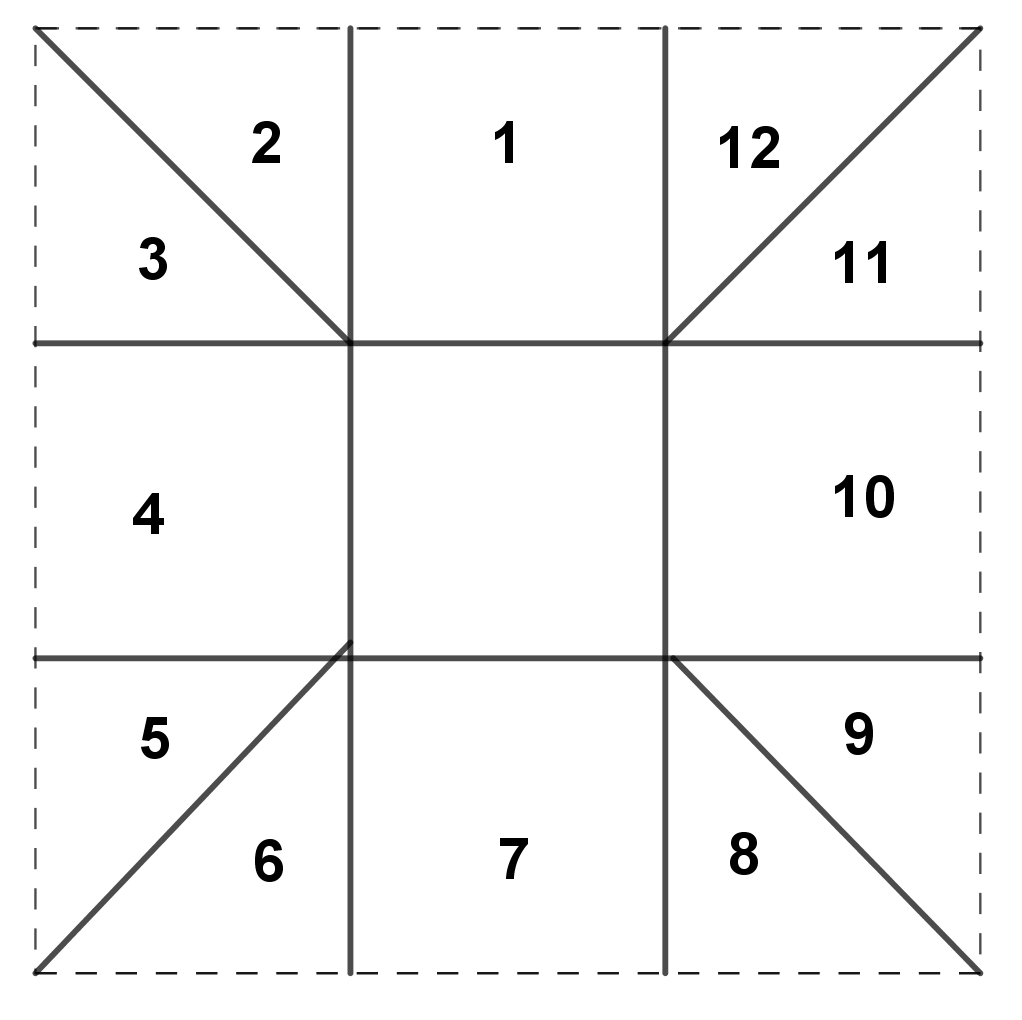
The kuṇḍali in eastern India (numbers denote rāśi-s)

The kuṇḍali format followed in eastern India is depicted in the attached figure. The format is sometimes drawn with a square showing the outer boundary (in the attached figure, the square drawn using dashed lines segments). As in the format followed in southern India, this format is also rāśi-centric. The first rāśi, Meṣa occupies the central cell in the top row of the diagram (the cell marked 1). The other rāśi-s are represented by the remaining cells selected in the anti-clockwise direction. In the format followed in southern India, the cells are assigned rāśi-s in the clockwise direction. This format has the same advantages as the format followed in southern India.

=== The kuṇḍali in northern India ===
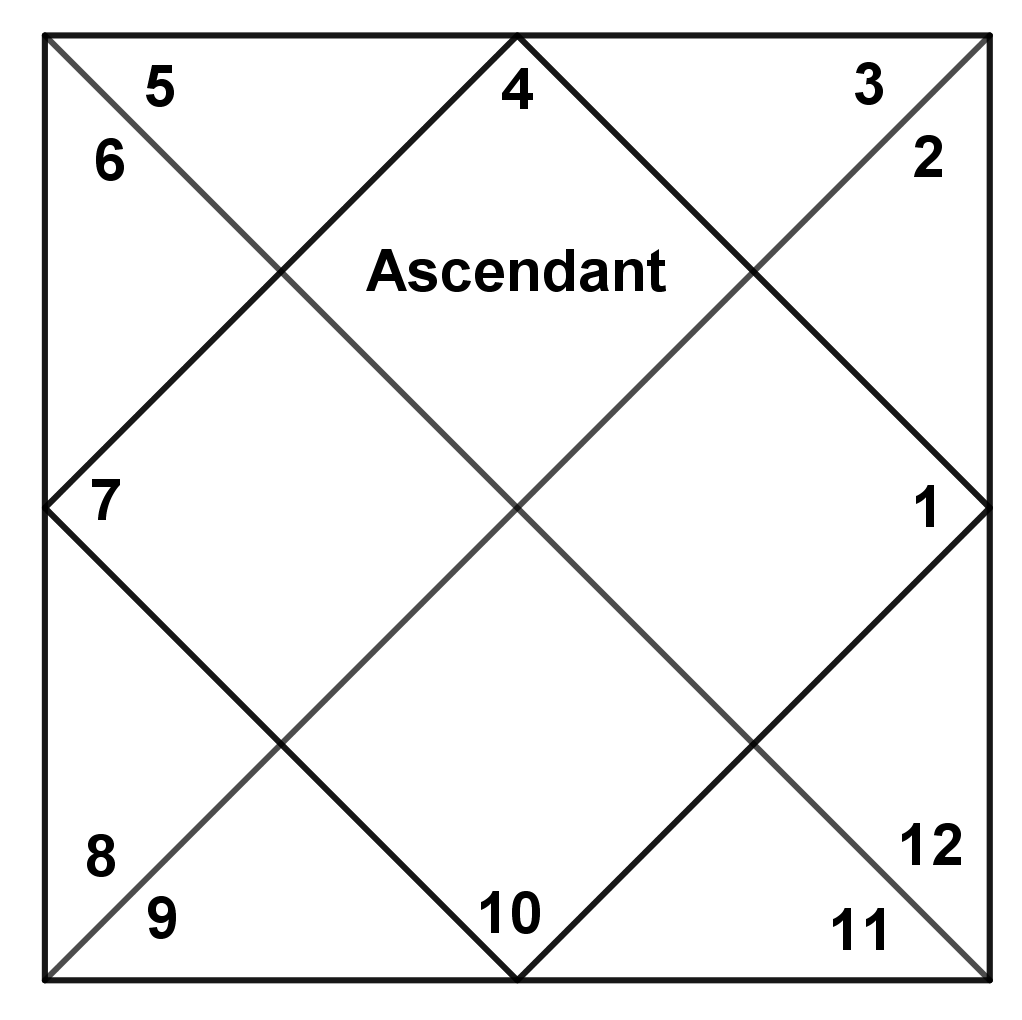
The kuṇḍali in northern India with fourth rāśi (Karka) as the ascendant

The kuṇḍali format followed in northern India is bhāva-centric (or, house-centric). In traditional practice, each rāśi is a house or bhāva. The beginning of each house is the 0th degrees of the rāśi and the end is the 30th degree of the rāśi. What varies from is the enumeration of these bhāva-s, i.e., which rāśi is the first bhāva, which is the second, and so forth. This is determined by the position of the Lagna (the Ascendant) The house in which the Lagna falls is usually the first bhāva, and the other bhāva-s follow it, counter-clockwise, in the sequence of the zodiac. In the kuṇḍali format followed in northern India, the first bhāva is always in the topmost middle diamond. In this format, the bhāva that each section denotes is static. The rāśi-s assigned to the sections change. This format is more of an astrological perspective than an astronomical one. The format is meaningless without numbering as the rāśi of each house cannot be determined without numbers. The rāśi-s are numbered as follows: 1. Meṣa (Aries), 2. Vṛṣabha (Taurus), 3.Mithuna (Gemini), 4. Karka (Cancer), 5. Siṃha (Leo), 6. Kanyā (Virgo), 7. Tulā (Libra), 8. Vṛścika (Scorpio), 9. Dhanuṣa (Sagittarius), 10. Makara (Capricornus), 11. Kumbha (Aquarius), 12. Meena (Pisces).
