= Imum coeli =

Latin for "bottom of the sky"

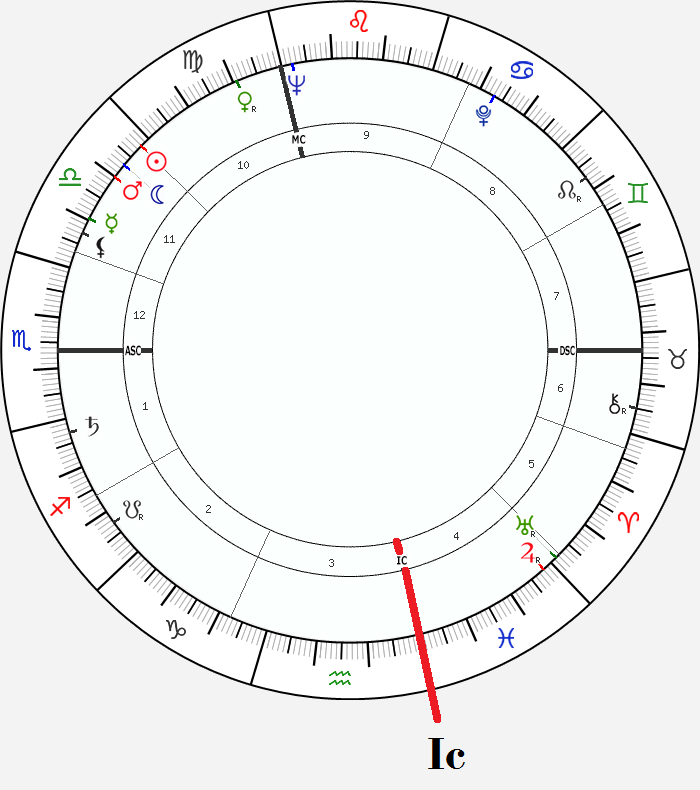

In astrology, the Imum Coeli (IC; from Latin for "bottom of the sky") is the point in space where the ecliptic crosses the meridian in the north, exactly opposite the Midheaven. It marks the fourth house cusp in most house systems (this is reversed in the Southern Hemisphere).

== Astrological significance ==
The Imum Coeli is said to refer to people's roots and also to the least conscious part of the self. It symbolizes foundations, beginnings in life, what may have been experienced through parental inheritance and homeland influences, need for security and relationships with the home and family life. It also may describe the circumstances that someone will encounter at the end of their life. Because this house was the most distant point possible from the visible part of the horoscope, Hellenistic astrologers considered the IC to be the home of the underworld, or Hades.

In many cases the IC refers to a parent—traditionally, the mother. Modern astrologers may use the IC as a significator for the father, or for both parents. There is no consensus in modern usage for which parent is best represented by the IC. The point is moot for Hellenistic astrologers who considered the fourth house the house of the father, but did not use the Imum Coeli as the cusp of the fourth house.

Using the natural houses system (see cadent houses) and modern quadrant house systems in which the IC is the cusp of the fourth house, some modern astrologers see a correspondence between the fourth house and the astrological sign Cancer. However, traditional astrologers, using whole-sign houses, never made this connection.

In whole-sign house systems the signs and houses have the same boundaries; hence the Imum Coeli can actually appear in the third house, the fourth house or fifth house; in cases of extreme terrestrial latitude, it may even fall in the second or sixth houses.

== See also ==
- Angle (astrology)
- Ascendant
- Descendant (astrology)
- Midheaven
- Nadir
