= Reception (astrology) =

Planet in the sign of a planet that has dignity

In astrology, reception is a condition where one planet is located in a sign where a second planet has astrological dignity--for example, a sign which the second planet rules or in which it is exalted, or where the second planet is the triplicity ruler.

In such a case, the first planet is said to be "received" by the dignified planet, and this relationship was seen by ancient and medieval astrologers to function in a similar way to that of host and guest. The dignified planet is strong, and hence provides support and assistance to the second planet which falls within its purview.

Consider the Sun in Libra. Venus is said to 'receive' the Sun because he is visiting her sign. In this capacity Venus is known as the Sun's dispositor.

— Deborah Houlding

Sometimes this relationship is mutual—that is, each planet is in each other's sign of dignity. This condition is called mutual reception or "exchange of signs" and can be very beneficial to both planets.
