= Succedent house =

House of gains in the zodiac

Succedent house is an astrological term for the houses that follow (i.e., succeed) the angular houses in an Astrological chart. “Succedent” derives from the Latin succedens meaning "subsequent" or "succeeding". Since the angular houses are the first, fourth, seventh and tenth houses, the succedent houses are the second, fifth, eighth, and eleventh houses.

== Succedent houses ==
Because the angular houses are the most powerful places in the chart (Lilly says "Planets in angles do more forcibly show their effects"), succedent houses—which are less powerful than the angular but more powerful than the cadent houses—also have a quality of appertaining to the angular houses, much as a representative or underling of a powerful person. In this way, the second house, for example, which succeeds the first house of the body and personality, tends to signify the things that belong to the person. In a similar fashion, the eighth house, which follows the seventh house of the partner or spouse or “other person,” represents the belongings of the other person or partner. Succedent houses, as a whole, have a stable, unchanging, fixed quality, deriving from their central position in each quadrant of the chart.

Although at least one succedent house has a decidedly malefic (or unfortunate) connotation (the eighth house), and one is rather weak (the second), on the whole, these are productive houses in which matters normally take root and flourish, such as possessions (the second house) or children (the fifth house.)

== Second house ==
The second house signifies the possessions of the person or event for which the chart was cast. This meaning has persisted unchanged for several thousand years. Although some modern astrologers (those using the idea of "natural houses," which is explained more fully in cadent house) perceive a correspondence of the second house with the sign Taurus, traditional astrologers did not make such a connection. To Hellenistic astrologers, the second house was the "Gate of Hades," referring to the fact that the second house leads the way to the houses that lie beneath the horizon of the chart (that is, the second, third, fourth, fifth, and sixth houses.) This may account for the house's somewhat weak reputation, although it is not considered specifically malefic. No planet has any particular dignity here.

== Fifth house ==
The fifth house has signified children for several thousand years. As with the second, that primary connotation has continued into the present day. Modern astrologers sometimes also connect this house with sexual relationships and also with artistic, as well as biological, creativity. For the ancients, this was the "House of Good Fortune," and quite a positive and beneficial one. For that reason, ancient and medieval astrologers believed the fortunate planet Venus "joyed" in the fifth house—that is, that she was particularly dignified, or powerful here. However, as Crane says, "in spite of this house being the joy of Venus, pleasures and sensual enjoyments were not emphasized until later" than the Hellenistic era. For some 20th-century practitioners, the fifth house corresponds by the idea of "natural houses" to Leo, but there is no intimation of the Sun's influence here in the traditional literature.

== Eighth house ==
The eighth is the one unfortunate house in the succedent group. This connotation derives from the lack of relationship of the eighth house with the house of the Ascendant. Because there is no astrological aspect with the Ascendant, the eighth house cannot "see" the Ascendant from its position. For this reason it has a rather tenuous relationship with the health and power of the first house. Therefore, it was called "Idle," a term reflecting its relative lack of active power within the circle of the houses. It was from this that its traditional connection with Death was established, since the first house is the house of health and vitality. Indeed, modern astrologers—and also Lilly --often call the eighth the "House of Death." Not all connections with death are negative; the eighth is also the house of inheritances resulting from death. Also, according to Paulus Alexandrinus, it "show[s] those who profit from deadly motives."

Some modern astrologers see elements of spirituality here, since the survival of the soul is connected with death as well. Furthermore, some make a connection of the eighth house with sex—probably from a hypothetical connection to Scorpio by "natural houses." No planet "joys" in the eighth house.

== Eleventh house ==
The ancients called the eleventh house the "House of Good Spirit" or "Good Divinity," and it was considered a very beneficial place in the chart. The primary meaning of this house, too, has survived more or less intact into the 21st-century: a house of hopes, aspirations and expectations, a place for the fulfilling of desires—and in a very worldly way. Worldly eminence and material abundance are denoted by this house, and the most beneficial planet in the zodiac, Jupiter, has his joy here.

Modern astrology has lost some of the sense of material success and money that this house originally signified (Jupiter was the ancient planet of money), but it is still considered a house of wishes and hopes. In addition, modern astrologers perceive the eleventh to be a house of clubs and associations, of groups of people working together—and also a house denoting friendships. Traditionally, since the eleventh appertains to the tenth and the tenth was the house of the king, the eleventh has denoted the king's advisers, his council and allies.

For some modern astrologers, the eleventh house is connected to the sign Aquarius by "natural house" affinities, but since Saturn is the traditional ruler of Aquarius and it would make little sense for Saturn to be comfortable in Jupiter's house (and vice versa), this association did not exist in astrology until more recent times.

== Footnotes ==
1. "Latin succedere to go up, follow after, succeed, from sub- near + cedere to go" from succeed. (2009). In Merriam-Webster Online Dictionary. Retrieved March 19, 2009, from http://www.merriam-webster.com/dictionary/succeedfrom
2. William Lilly, Christian Astrology (London, 1647), p. 48.
3. as summed up by William Lilly (1647): "The angles are most powerful, the succedants are next in virtue, the cadents poor, and of little efficacy: the succedant houses follow the angles, the cadents come next [after] the succedants," (Ibid., Book I, p. 48) and (speaking horary chart judgments) "The nearer your Significator is to an Angle, the more good you may expect; less, if placed in a Succeedant house; little, if in a Cadent." (Ibid., Book II, p. 301.)
4. Guido Bonatti, Liber Astronomiae, Part II. [tr. Robert Zoller]. Project Hindsight, The Golden Hind Press (Berkeley Springs, WV, 1994.) pp. 2–3. Bonatti compares the fixed signs to the middle months of each of the four seasons, in which the season is established and fixed in character. In the same way, the succedent houses, in the center of each quadrant, have a fixed character.
5. "It signifies fear and anguish of mind" says Lilly (Op Cit., Book I, p. 54.)
6. Lilly (Ibid., p. 48) lists the second house as the fourth weakest house in the chart.
7. "[...] the estate or judgement concerning the estate or fortune [..], of [...] wealth or poverty, of all removable goods, money lent, of profit or gain, loss or damage." (Lilly, Ibid., p. 31.)
8. See the 2nd century CE Vettius Valens, The Anthology, Book II, Part I [tr. by Robert Schmidt] Project Hindsight, The Golden Hind Press (Berkeley springs, WV, 1994), p. 17; and also the 4th century CE Paulus Alexandrinus, Introductory Matters in Late Classical Astrology: Paulus Alexandrinus and Olympiodorus (with the Scholia of later Latin Commentators). [Translated by Dorian Gieseler Greenbaum.] Archive for the Retrieval of Historical Astrological Texts (ARHAT), 2001. Page 45.
9. Paulus Alexandrinus, Op. cit., p. 46.
10. Joseph Crane. A Practical Guide to Traditional Astrology. (ARHAT [Archive for the Retrieval of Historical Astrological Texts], Orleans Massachusetts, 1997), p. 28.
11. Lilly says of it: "The estate of men deceased, death, its quality and nature." (Lilly, Op. Cit., p. 54.)
12. Crane, Op. Cit., p. 30. (quoted from Paulus Alexandrinus, Introductory Matters, Ch. 24.)
13. Vettius Valens, Op. Cit., Book II, Part 1, pp. 10–11.

== See also ==
- Natal astrology
- House
- Angular house
- Cadent house
