= Quincunx (disambiguation) =

A quincunx originally meant a 5/12 fraction of something, but most modern uses involve patterns of five points. "Quincunx" or "quincuncial" may in particular refer to

== Derived from original meaning ==
- Quincunx (Roman coin), a bronze coin with the value of 5/12 of an as
- Quincunx (astrology), an angle of 150°, 5/12 of a complete circle

== Geometric patterns of points ==
- Quincunx, five points, four in a square with one more in the middle of the square.
- An orchard planted in a square lattice aligned diagonally to the surrounding plot of land
- Quincunx matrix, a 2×2 Hadamard matrix that generates points in a diagonal lattice pattern
- Bean machine, also called a quincunx, a machine designed by Sir Francis Galton to demonstrate normal distributions, consisting of an array of pins in a diagonal lattice pattern
- Quincuncial map, a method of mapping the globe onto a square so that the poles map to the five points of a quincunx
- Place des Quinconces, a city square in Bordeaux, France, named for the quincunx pattern in which its trees were planted
- Rhombic lattice, the points of intersection of two families of equally spaced parallel lines, called a quincunx in 19th-century mathematics

== Literature ==
- The Garden of Cyrus or The Quincunciall Lozenge, 1658 philosophical treatise by Sir Thomas Browne involving the quincunx pattern
- Mistress Masham's Repose, 1946 novel by T. H. White in which a lake is called the Quincunx
- The Quincunx of Time, 1973 science fiction novel by James Blish
- The Avignon Quintet, five novels described by their author, Lawrence Durrell, as forming a quincunx
- The Quincunx, 1989 novel by Charles Palliser that traces five generations of five families
- The Quincunx Cycle, series of novels begun in 2014 by Canadian author André Alexis

== Biology ==
- Quincuncial aestivation, an arrangement of five parts of a flower bud prior to opening found in some plants
- Quincuncina, a genus of freshwater mussels named for the pattern of nodules on its shells
