= Cadent house =

House of declining strength in the zodiac

In astrology, a cadent house is the last house of each quadrant of the zodiac. A quadrant begins with an Angular house, (the house in which a chart angle lies) proceeds to a succedent house and ends with a cadent house. There are four quadrants in an astrological chart, providing four angular, four succedent, and four cadent houses.

The Greeks called the cadent houses apoklima, which literally means "falling" or "decline," because the houses were seen to be falling away from the strength of the angular houses, which were considered to be most influential because of their perpendicular and oppositive relationships to the Ascendant. The word apoklima also carries a denotation of degeneration and decline. Our English word "cadent" comes from the Latin translation of apoklima and is the source of our word "cadet," which originally meant a lesser branch of the family, or the younger son.

Cadent houses are therefore usually considered by astrologers as less fertile and productive places by their nature than either angular or succedent houses, and the planets located in them are seen as generally less powerful and comfortable. This view of cadency is universally found in ancient sources. For example, Paulus Alexandrinus says of cadent houses: "stars [ed: i.e., planets] found in these zoidia [ed: i.e., houses] (3, 6, 9 and 12) become inharmonious. And sometimes they bring about hostile conditions, sometimes separations and banishments...." (However, there are conditions when a planet in a cadent house can be brought up to its full strength, for example, by a reasonably close trine to a benefic planet, such as Jupiter).

The notion of cadent houses as weak and ineffective also persists with medieval and Renaissance astrologers, such as Guido Bonatti and William Lilly, who labeled cadent houses "poor and of little efficacy."

== The four cadent houses ==
The four cadent houses are as follows:

- The third house of the horoscope governs our siblings, letters and messengers, our neighbourhood, and short trips. Modern astrologers have also connected it our ability to communicate and to intellectualise.
- The sixth house of the horoscope refers to illness, and also to our duties and responsibilities, and the most routine aspects of work. The sixth is the house of servants, and so may also refer to our service to others, but also to slavery, or that which we are obliged to do but do not necessarily want to do. It has been connected by Lilly to smaller domestic animals as well, "and the profit and loss got thereby."
- The ninth house of the horoscope governs our higher cognition, religious beliefs, and level of awareness. It is also the house of higher education and philosophy and is connected with long journeys far from home. Some modern astrologers also give it an association with the law.
- The twelfth house of the horoscope governs troubles, self-undoing, secret enemies, and imprisonment (for example in asylums or penitentiaries), as well as larger domestic animals, such as draught animals. Theosophists like Annie Besant influenced astrologers like Isabel Hickey to connect this house to karma from past lives.

== Natural houses ==
In the twentieth century, a concept called "natural houses" was popular, in which it was argued that each of the twelve houses of the astrological chart corresponds to a sign of the zodiac: the first house corresponds to Aries, the second to Taurus, and so forth, continuing through the chart until the twelfth house, which is linked to Pisces.

Employing "natural houses," the third house would correspond to Gemini, the sixth house to Virgo, the ninth house to Sagittarius, and the twelfth house to Pisces, and adherents of the notion borrow archetypal concepts from the signs and apply them to the corresponding houses.

The idea of numerological correspondences goes back at least as far as Pythagoras and was surely instrumental in the interpretation by ancient astrologers of the angular relationships each house has with the others, and especially with the Ascendant. This may account for similarities between the idea of Gemini and the idea of the third house. But the "natural houses" doctrine stretches these similarities to a point which seriously distorts the original concepts. Hardly any of these zodiacal correspondences result in the same characteristics or dignities observed by earlier astrologers.

Furthermore, using "natural houses," cadent signs are seen to be very flexible and adaptive and correspond with the mutable signs of the zodiac. But this obscures the essentially weak and unfavorable nature of these houses. Planets positioned in them lack influence and may even become malefic—that is, they may have an unfortunate effect.

== Third house ==
Ancient astrologers had a very different view of the third house than a correspondence to Gemini would imply. The house's primary significance was for siblings—a meaning it retains today. But Gemini has no such meaning. For another thing, the third house was the "House of the Moon Goddess" rather than having any correspondence with Mercury, the ruler of Gemini. The Moon "rejoiced" in the third house—that is, it was very dignified if positioned there. The house was also the place of religious cults, particularly unconventional ones (possibly what we would now call the "occult") and had nothing to do with writing or speaking. It is true, however, that the Moon was much more involved in the ancient concept of the mind—particularly with memory.

The third house also had some connotation for travel but Crane postulates that this derived more from the fact that it opposed the ninth house, the house of the Sun, which had the major connotation for travel.

== Sixth house ==
Ancient astrologers had a very dim view of the sixth house, which is called "the house of bad fortune." Valens makes a clear connection between this house and thieves, beggars, foot soldiers, and slaves. The house has always had a connection with sickness, and hence with suffering. One reason for this is because it is in a very weak angle to the house of the Ascendant, which is considered the house of life, vitality, and health. The relationship of the sixth house to the Ascendant is one of aversion, that is, it cannot "see" the Ascendant from a point 150 degrees away.

Because of this weakness, the sixth house has also been connected with servitude and slavery, and it is for this reason, perhaps, that it has become associated with the most routine and arduous of work, and the sense of the workplace as an obligation to which people must report every day to do the work of others. This is not by any means the house of vocation, or even of the professions. Animals, too, are considered to be the servants of man, and possibly the animals connected here are smaller because the sixth is the lesser of the two houses of misfortune.

The planet Mars rejoices in the sixth house. He is dignified when located in this house. Mars is considered a malefic planet, whose influence is often unfortunate and aggressive. Mars's joy in the sixth may have to do with his long connection with fevers and acute illness, but it is also true that Mars is the "lesser infortune" (Saturn is the "greater") and hence joys in the lesser house of misfortune.

It seems (according to this page) it is not sure in which category the philosophy of Mars in the sixth house belongs: is it the Christian, modern, etc. astrology? The same counts for the exaltations in the houses below.

== Ninth house ==
The ninth house, which ancient astrologers called "the house of the Sun God," has been associated with orthodox religion and with journeys (often undertaken for educational purposes in ancient times). The Sun rejoices here, and the Sun in late Hellenistic religions was regarded as the eye of God. Valens calls this house the "pre-Midheaven" and gives it considerable influence. Both benefic and malefic planets are strengthened here.

Medieval astrologers connect it with the Church and clerics, long sea voyages, books, learning, philosophy and dreams. This connection with dreams is quite ancient, and references to the ninth house in this capacity can be found in Firmicus and in Paulus Alexandrinus.

== Twelfth house ==
Western astrologers regarded the twelfth house as a very unfortunate place. Hellenistic astrologers called it "the house of Evil Spirit" and its reputation did not improve with the Arabs or with medieval astrologers. However, Saturn the "greater malefic," does rejoice here—which means he has considerable dignity—and Valens says that Saturn in this place will bring considerable influence for honorable behavior. Paulus claims that an otherwise strong Saturn located here will bring success over enemies and joy in work.

Firmicus connects this house with slaves, enemies and defects, and Valens connects it with destitution and beggary. The connection with very bad luck and material privation is almost universally found with the twelfth, as are enemies.

It is from medieval astrologers that the connection of the twelfth house with imprisonment derives; the idea is probably Arab in origin.

Modern astrologers have brought a spiritual aspect to the twelfth house that was wholly absent in the earlier tradition. This may have its origins in the Theosophical revival of present-day astrology, which had some Hindu influence. In Jyotish (Hindu astrology), the twelfth house is very unfortunate but is also connected with sexual activity and with spirituality. Hindu astrology is closely connected to the Hindu religion, in which material attachments of all kinds—which are certainly the enemy of all twelfth-house significations—are considered to be a bar to spiritual progress. Much has been made of this suggested affinity by some modern astrologers, especially those influenced by the 19th-century Theosophy movement, such as Annie Besant and Alice Bailey.

== See also ==
- Natal astrology
- House
- Angular house
- Succedent house

== Notes ==
1. Joseph Crane. A Practical Guide to Traditional Astrology. (ARHAT [Archive for the Retrieval of Historical Astrological Texts], Orleans Massachusetts, 1997), p. 20.
2. Webster's Unabridged Dictionary online, downloaded January 27, 2006
3. Paulus Alexandrinus, Introductory Matters, in Late Classical Astrology: Paulus Alexandrinus and Olympiodorus, with the Scholia from Later Commentators, (translated by Dorian Gieseler Greenbaum) Archive for the Retrieval of Historical Astrological Texts (ARHAT), Reston, VA, 2001, p. 19.
4. Ibid.
5. William Lilly. Christian Astrology (London, 1647), p. 48.
6. Ibid., p. 53.
7. Isabel M. Hickey, Astrology, a Cosmic Science. (CRCS Publications, Sebastopol, CA, 1992) ISBN 0-916360-52-0. [new edition of work originally written in 1970.]
8. such as the work of Zip Dobyns, sometimes called the "Zip code," in which the first house is equal to the first planet (Aries), the second house to the second planet (Taurus) and so forth. See for example, Zip Dobyns (Pottenger), Finding the Person in the Horoscope (TIA Publications, Los Angeles, 1973) and Maritha Pottenger, Easy Astrology Guide (ACS Publications, San Diego, 1996.) ISBN 0-935127-49-6.
9. or "place of the Goddess of the Moon," Vettius Valens. Anthologiae. [Translated by Robert Schmidt for Project Hindsight] (The Golden Hind Press, Berkeley Springs, West Virginia, 1994.) Book II, Part I, pp. 16.17.
10. Crane, op. cit., p. 27.
11. Vettius Valens. Anthologiae. [Translated by Robert Schmidt for Project Hindsight] (The Golden Hind Press, Berkeley Springs, West Virginia, 1994.) Book II, Part I, p. 14.
12. or "place of the God of the Sun," Ibid., Book II, Part I, pp. 10–11.
13. Ibid., Book II, Part I, p. 11.
14. Lilly, op. cit., p. 55.
15. Valens, op. cit., Book II, Part I, p. 10.
16. Valens, Ibid.
17. Paulus Alexandrinus. Introductory Matters. [Translated by Robert Schmidt for Project Hindsight] (The Golden Hind Press, Berkeley Springs, West Virginia, 1993), Chapter 24 (as referenced by Crane, op. cit., p. 31.)
18. Crane, op. cit. p. 31.
19. Ibid.
20. Ibid.
21. American Jyotisha James Braha defines this as "the pleasures of the bed (sexual pleasure)" (in James T. Braha, Ancient Hindu Astrology for the Modern Western Astrologer [Hermetician Press, Hollywood, FL, 1986], p. 40.) Jyotish Astrologer Hart deFouw and Ayurvedic practitioner Robert Svoboda may be more helpful by listing the first region of life governed by this house as "comforts of the bed (like sleep or sex), convalescence, confinement..." (in Hart deFouw and Robert Svoboda, Light on Life: An Introduction to the Astrology of India, [Penguin Books, 1996], p. 147.)
22. Ronnie Gale Dreyer, Vedic Astrology, (Samuel Weiser, York Beach, ME, 1997), pp. 91–92.
