= Angular house =

Houses taking specific angles in the horoscope

In astrology, an angular house, or cardinal house, is one of four cardinal houses of the horoscope, which are the houses in which the angles of the chart (the Ascendant, the Midheaven, the Imum Coeli and the Descendant) are found. The angular houses of the horoscope are considered to be the most ardent, or forceful, and are considered to have the greatest impact in the chart. The influential 17th-century astrologer William Lilly states simply: "Planets in angles do more forcibly show their effects." Angular houses rule those critical things in our life, such as our appearance and how we behave, our family life, our married life or partnerships, and our career.

== First house ==
The first house, which is often (but not always) the Ascendant, signifies the person in the chart, their personality, and their behaviour. Quite often, the Ascendant can overshadow a person's Sun sign. For example, a person who has Leo on the cusp of their first house and Virgo as their Sun sign can be quite dynamic and dramatic, but the fastidious, efficient, self-effacing part of themself will not be readily apparent until people are able to pierce through the persona and see the real person.

== Fourth house ==
The fourth house, of which the cusp is often (but not always) the Imum Coeli, signifies a person's home, security, family, and those things in early life that served as a foundation for them. Sometimes the fourth house also is connected with endings, such as a person's end of life. This house is affiliated often with our parents. For the ancients, it was the House of the Mother, but in modern charts, it tends to have a more general parental significance.

== Seventh house ==
The seventh house, of which the cusp is often (but not always) the Descendant, shows the type of mate the native is likely to be attracted to and all partnerships in general. For Hellenistic astrologers, the seventh house was in general a fortunate one, especially for benefics, but there are some difficulties which may arise from these placements because the house is "the Setting Place" or the place where the Sun falls.

== Tenth house ==
The tenth house, of which the cusp is often (but not always) the Midheaven, refers to our careers, vocations, creative output, and how we would like the world to see us. For Ptolemy, it also was the house where our children's impact can be seen.

== See also ==
- Natal astrology
- House (astrology)
- Succedent house
- Cadent house
