= Astrological aspect =

Angle the planets make to each other in the horoscope

Astrological aspects are illustrated in the center of this natal chart. Different symbols and colors illustrate different aspects, such as the red square or green trine.

In astrology, an aspect is an angle that planets make to each other in the horoscope; as well as to the Ascendant, Midheaven, Descendant, Lower Midheaven, and other points of astrological interest. As viewed from Earth, aspects are measured by the angular distance in degrees and minutes of ecliptic longitude between two points. According to astrological tradition, they indicate the timing of transitions and developmental changes in the lives of people and affairs relative to the Earth.

For example, if an astrologer creates a Horoscope that shows the apparent positions of the celestial bodies at the time of a person's birth (Natal Chart), and the angular distance between Mars and Venus is 92° ecliptic longitude, the chart is said to have the aspect "Venus Square Mars" with an orb of 2° (i.e., it is 2° away from being an exact Square; a Square being a 90° aspect). The more exact an aspect, the stronger or more dominant it is said to be in shaping character or manifesting change.

With Natal charts, other signs may take precedence over a Sun sign. For example, an Aries may have several other planets in Cancer or Pisces. Therefore, the two latter signs may be more influential.

== History and approach ==
In medieval astrology, certain aspects and planets were considered to be either favorable (benefic) or unfavorable (malefic). Modern usage places less emphasis on these fatalistic distinctions. The more modern approach to astrological aspects is exemplified by research on astrological harmonics. In 1619, Johannes Kepler advocates this in his book Harmonice Mundi. Thereafter, John Addey was a major proponent. However, even in modern times, aspects are considered to be either easy (60° Sextile or 120° Trine) or hard (90° Square or 180° Opposition). Depending on the involved planets, a Conjunction (0°, which is a discounting orb) may be in either category.

Easy aspects may be positive, because they enhance opportunity for talent to grow. Hard aspects may be negative, because they enhance a challenge where an adjustment must be made to reach balance. Typically, manifestation may occur with a Conjunction, Square or Opposition.

Planets may be considered. Mars and Uranus tend to ignite while Saturn and Neptune inhibit. Whether a planet is direct or retrograde is of great significance. An eclipse of the Sun or Moon is even more significant. The South Node of the Moon denotes innate wisdom from past experience while the North Node denotes karma and evolution.

Astrological Signs may be considered. For example, the fire signs of Aries, Leo and Sagittarius are more compatible with the air signs of Gemini, Libra and Aquarius. The Earth signs of Taurus, Virgo and Capricorn are more compatible with the water signs of Cancer, Scorpio and Pisces. The mutable signs of Gemini, Virgo, Sagittarius and Pisces may be flexible. The cardinal signs of Aries, Cancer, Libra and Capricorn may change their mind. The fixed signs of Taurus, Leo, Scorpio and Aquarius may be difficult.

Astrological Houses may be considered.

=== Ptolemaic Aspects ===
Since they were defined and used by Ptolemy in the 1st Century AD, the traditional major aspects are sometimes called Ptolemaic Aspects. These aspects are the Conjunction (0°), Sextile (60°), Square (90°), Trine (120°), and Opposition (180°). Major aspects are those that are divisible by 10 and evenly divided in relation to 360° (with the exception of the Semisextile and the Novile).

When calculating or using aspects, different astrologers and separate astrological systems/traditions utilize differing orbs, which is the degree of separation between exactitude. Orbs may also be subject to variation, depending on the need for detail and personal preferences. Although, when compared to other aspects, almost all astrologers use a larger orb for a Conjunction.

=== Kepler's Aspects ===
Collective astrological data along with Johannes Kepler described 13 aspects in his book Harmonice Mundi. Astrological data grouped together in five degrees of influentially picked from symbol ratios encountered in geometry and music: 0/2, 1/2, 1/5, 2/6, 1/3, 1/12 along with 1/5, 2/5, 15/5, 10, 10/3, 8, and 8/3. The general names for whole divisors are (Latin) n-ile for whole fractions 1/n, and m-n-ile for fraction m/n. A Semi-n-tile is a 2n-tile, 1/(2n), and Sesqui-n-tile is a Tri-2n-tile, 3/(2n).

All aspects can be seen as small whole number harmonics, (1/n of 360°). Multiples of m/n create new aspects where there are no common factors between n and m, gcd(n,m)=1.

General Aspects
Degree of Influentiality	First		Second		Third		Fourth			Fifth			
Aspect	Conjunction	Opposition	Trine Bisextile	Square Quartile	Sextile Semitrine	Semisextile Duodecile	Quincunx Quinduodecile	Quintile Bidecile	Biquintile	Octile Semisquare	Trioctile Sesquiquadrate	Decile Semiquintile	Tridecile Sesquiquintile
Glyph								Q	bQ				^{3}
Angle	0°	180°	120°	90°	60°	30°	150°	72°	144°	45°	135°	36°	108°
Fraction	0/2	1/2	1/3	1/4	1/6	1/12	5/12	1/5	2/5	1/8	3/8	1/10	3/10
Regular Polygon	Monogon	Digon	Triangle	Square	Hexagon	Dodecagon	Dodecagram	Pentagon	Pentagram	Octagon	Octagram	Decagon	Decagram

== Major aspects ==
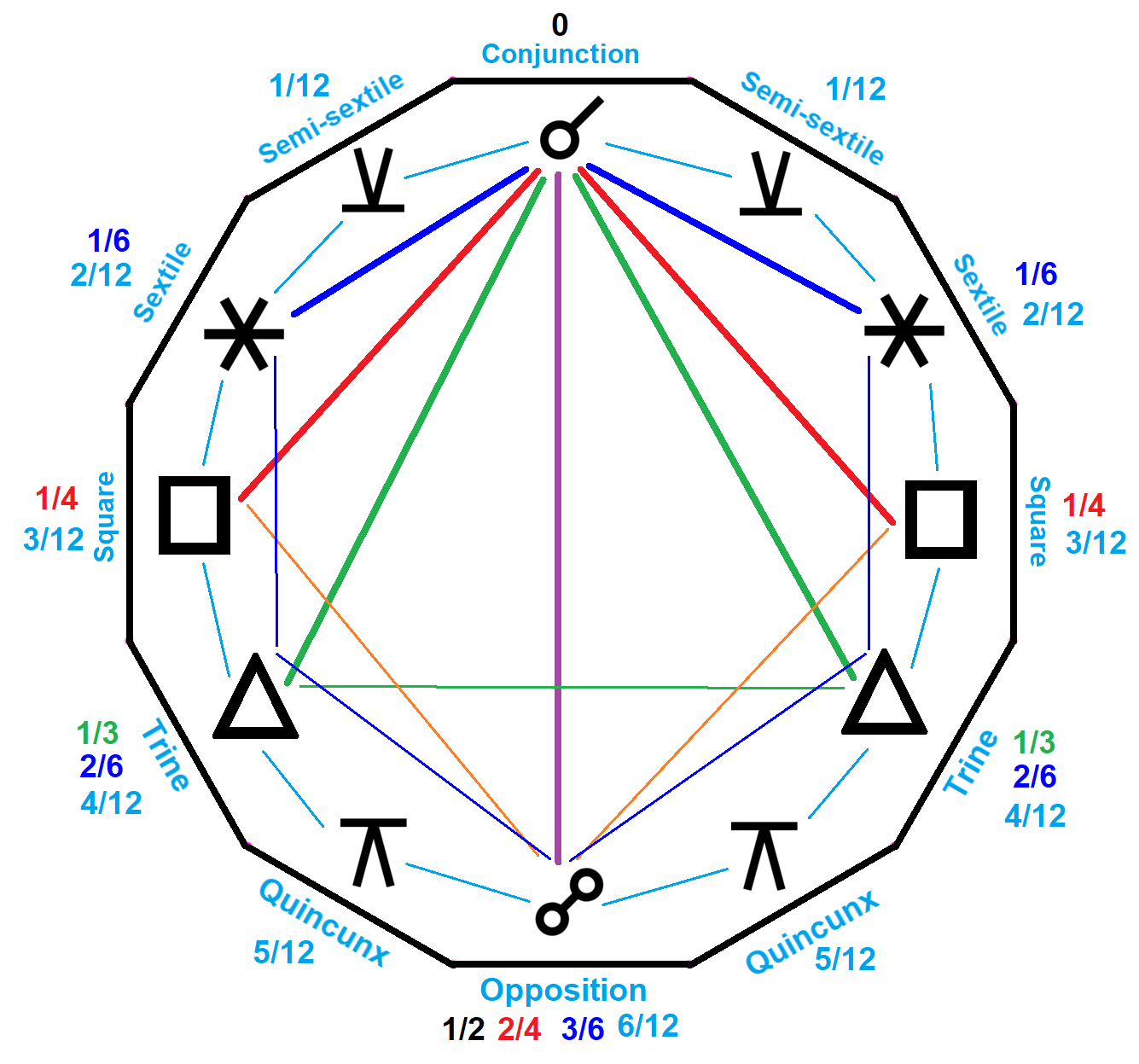
The primary astrological aspects around the sky are: 0° conjunction, 30° semi-sextile, 60° sextile, 90° square, 120° trine, 150° quincunx, and 180° opposition. Five of them exist in east/west pairs.

=== Conjunction ===

A conjunction (abbreviated as "Con") is an angle of approximately (~) 0–10°. Typically, an orb of ~10° is considered to be a conjunction. If neither the Sun or Moon are involved, some astrologers consider a maximum orb of 8°.

Conjunctions are a major aspect in a horoscope chart. They are said to be the most powerful aspects, because they mutually intensify the effects of the involved planets.

Depending on the involved planets, a conjunction may be beneficial or detrimental. Highly favourable conjunctions may involve the Sun, Venus, and Jupiter in their three (or four) possible combinations. Highly unfavourable conjunctions may involve the Moon, Mars, and Saturn in their three (or four) possible combinations. Exceptionally, on November 9–10 of 1970, the Sun, Venus, and Jupiter were in a three-way beneficial conjunction. In that same year, on March 10, the Moon, Mars, and Saturn were in 3-way detrimental conjunction.

If either of two planets involved in a Conjunction is also under tension from one or more hard aspects with one or more other planets, then the added presence of a Conjunction will further intensify the tension of that hard aspect.

If a planet is in "very" close conjunction to the Sun (within 17 minutes of arc or only about 0.28°), the conjunction is of great strength. The planet is said to be cazimi, which is an ancient astrological term meaning "in the heart" (of the Sun). For example, "Venus cazimi" means Venus is in conjunction with the Sun with an orb of less than ~0.28°.

If a planet is moderately close to the Sun—the specific orb limit may depend on the particular planet—it is said to be combust. Every month of the year, during the New Moon, the Sun and Moon experience a conjunction.

==== Great conjunctions ====
As illustrated, Jupiter and Saturn's Great Conjunctions repeat every ~120°. The three-fold pattern comes from a near 2:5 resonance while their period ratio is closer to 60:149. This creates 89 Conjunctions, which lead to a slow precession of a triangular pattern.	In 1606, Johannes Kepler's book, entitled as De Stella Nova, illustrated the Trigons of Great Conjunctions.

In the past, great conjunctions between the two slowest classical planets, Jupiter and Saturn, have attracted considerable attention as celestial omens. This interest can be traced back to Arabic translations found in Europe; most notably Albumasar's book on conjunctions. During the late Middle Ages and the Renaissance, these omens were a topic broached by most astronomers. This included scholastic thinkers, such as Roger Bacon and Pierre D'Ailly. Omens are also mentioned in popular literary writings by authors, such as Dante and Shakespeare. This interest continued up to the times of Tycho Brahe and Kepler.

Every 20 years, successive great conjunctions move retrograde ~120°. Sequential conjunctions appear as triangular patterns. They repeat after every third conjunction; they return after some 60 years to the vicinity of the first. These returns are observed to be shifted by ~8° relative to the fixed stars; no more than four of them occur in the same zodiac sign. Typically, conjunctions occur in one of the following Triplicities or Trigons of Zodiac signs:

Element	Conjunction 1			Conjunction 2			Conjunction 3		
Element	Sign	Symbol	Ecliptic Longitude	Sign	Symbol	Ecliptic Longitude	Sign	Symbol	Ecliptic Longitude
Fire Trigon	Aries		1 (0° to 30°)	Leo		5 (120° to 150°)	Sagittarius		9 (240° to 270°)
Earth Trigon	Taurus		2 (30° to 60°)	Virgo		6 (150° to 180°)	Capricorn		10 (270° to 300°)
Air Trigon	Gemini		3 (60° to 90°)	Libra		7 (180° to 210°)	Aquarius		11 (300° to 330°)
Water Trigon	Cancer		4 (90° to 120°)	Scorpio		8 (210° to 240°)	Pisces		12 (330° to 360°)

After about 220 years the pattern shifts to the next trigon; in ~900 years, the pattern returns to the first trigon.

To each triangular pattern, astrologers have ascribed one from a series of four elements. Particular importance has been accorded to the occurrence of a great conjunction in a new trigon, which is bound to happen after ~240 years at most. Greater importance is attributed to the beginning of a new cycle, which may occur after all four trigons have been visited, which occurs in ~900 years.

Typically, medieval astrologers used 960 years as the length of the full cycle, because, in some cases, it took 240 years to pass from one trigon to the next. If a cycle is defined by when the conjunctions return to the same right ascension rather than to the same constellation, the cycle is only ~800 years, because of axial precession. Use of the Alphonsine tables apparently led to the use of precessing signs; Kepler gave a value of 794 years, which created 40 Conjunctions.

Up to the end of the 16th century, despite the inaccuracies and some disagreement about the beginning of the cycle, the belief in the significance of such events generated a steady stream of publications. In 1583, the last great conjunction occurred in the watery trigon. It was widely supposed to herald apocalyptic changes. In 1586, a Papal Bull was issued against divinations. By 1603, public interest rapidly died, because nothing really significant had happened with the advent of a new Trigon.

Aspect Angles as Harmonic Ratios
Symbol	Harmonic	Angle	Name
	1/1	360° (0°)	Conjunction
	1/2	180°	Opposition
	1/4	90°	Square or Quartile or Quadrate
	1/8	45°	Octile or Semisquare
	3/8	135°	Trioctile or Sesquiquadrate
	1/16	22.5°	Sexdecile or Semioctile
	3/16	67.5°	Sesquioctile
	5/16	112.5°	Quinsemioctile
	7/16	157.5°	Sepsemioctile
	1/3	120°	Trine or Trinovile
	1/6	60°	Sextile or Semitrine
	1/12	30°	Duodecile or Semisextile
	5/12	150°	Quincunx or Quinduodecile or Inconjunct
	1/24	15°	Quattuorvigintile or Semiduodecile
	5/24	75°	Squile
	7/24	105°	Squine
	11/24	165°	Quindecile or Contraquindecile
Q	1/5	72°	Quintile
bQ	2/5	144°	Biquintile
D	1/10	36°	Decile or Semiquintile
D^{3}	3/10	108°	Tridecile or Sesquiquintile
√	1/15	24°	Quindecile or Trientquintile
√^{2}	2/15	48°	Biquindecile
√^{4}	4/15	96°	Quadraquindecile
√^{7}	7/15	168°	Sepquindecile
V	1/20	18°	Vigintile or Semidecile
V^{3}	3/20	54°	Trivigintile or Sesquidecile
V^{7}	7/20	126°	Sepvigintile
V^{9}	9/20	162°	Nonvigintile
	1/40	9°	Quadragintile or Semivigintile
S	1/7	51.43°	Septile
S^{2}	2/7	102.86°	Biseptile
S^{3}	3/7	154.29°	Triseptile
	1/14	25.71°	Semiseptile
	3/14	77.14°	Tresemiseptile or Sesquiseptile
	5/14	128.57°	Quinsemiseptile
N	1/9	40°	Novile
N^{2}	2/9	80°	Binovile
N^{4}	4/9	160°	Quadranovile
	1/18	20°	Octodecile or Seminovile or Vigintile
	1/36	10°	Trigintasextile
U	1/11	32.83°	Undecile or Undecim or Elftile
U^{2}	2/11	65.45°	Biundecile or Bielftile
U^{3}	3/11	98.18°	Triundecile or Trielftile
U^{4}	4/11	130.91°	Quadundecile or Quadrelftile
U^{5}	5/11	163.63°	Quinundecile or Quinelftile

=== Opposition ===

An Opposition (abbreviated as "Opp") is an angle of 180°, which is 1/2 of the 360° ecliptic. Depending on the involved planets, an orb of 5-10° is allowed.

An Opposition is said by Ibn Ezra to be the most powerful aspect. An opposition is fundamentally relational but not unifying or blending like a conjunction. Some astrologers say the energies in opposition are prone to exaggeration, because it has a dichotomous quality and issues arising from it are often tense.

All important axes in astrology are essentially Oppositions. Therefore, at its most basic level, an Opposition may often signify a relationship that can be oppositional or complementary.

=== Sextile ===

A Sextile (abbreviated as "SXt or Sex") is an angle of 60°, which is 1/6 of the 360° ecliptic or 1/2 a trine (120°). Depending on the involved planets, an orb of 4-5° is allowed. The symbol is the radii of a hexagon.

Traditionally, a Sextile is said to be similar in influence to a Trine, but less intense. It indicates compatibility and harmony, which eases communication between the two involved elements. It also provides opportunity. See information below on the Semisextile.

=== Square ===

A Square or Quartile (abbreviated as "SQr or Squ") is an angle of 90°, which is 1/4 of the 360° ecliptic or 1/2 an opposition (180°). Depending on the involved planets, an orb of 5-10° is allowed.

Typically, with a Square, Trine or Sextile, the outer or superior planet has an effect on the inner or inferior planet. A Square creates a strong and usable tension. It may integrate between two different areas of your life or it may offer a turning point where an important decision needs to be made that involves an opportunity at a cost. Typically, it involves Houses in different quadrants.

=== Trine ===

A Trine (abbreviated as "Tri") is an angle of 120°, which is 1/3 of the 360° ecliptic. Depending on the involved planets, an orb of 5-10° is allowed.

Traditionally, a Trine is extremely beneficial. It indicates harmony, ease and what is natural. A Trine may involve innate talent or ability. In transit, an event may emerge from a current or past situation in a natural way.

== Minor aspects ==
=== Semisextile ===
A Semisextile or Duodecile is an angle of 30°, which is 1/12 of the 360° ecliptic. An orb of ±1.2° is allowed. The symbol is 1/2 a Sextile (60°), which is the top radii of a hexagon; the internal angles are 60°.

Of the minor aspects, it may be the most often used, because it can be easily seen. It indicates a mental interaction between planets; it is more sensually than externally experienced.

With a Semisextile, energy gradually builds and potentiates. Consider other planets, Signs and Houses. A major aspect transit may be involved. To gain its benefit, make an effort.

=== Quincunx ===

A Quincunx or Quinduodecile or Inconjunct is an angle of 150°, which is 5/12 of the 360° ecliptic. Depending on the involved planets, an orb of ±3.5° is allowed. The symbol is the bottom radii of a hexagon, which is 1/2 a Sextile (60°) less than a semicircle; the internal angles are 60°.

An interpretation of a Quincunx may mostly rely on the involved planets, Signs and Houses. Different areas of your life, that are not usually in communication, may come together. Planets may be far apart in different house quadrants. With a shift in perspective, clarity may reveal what was not previously seen. If a third planet, in a major aspect, triangulates a Qunicunx, the effect may be very obvious.

For Quincunx, keywords are karmic, mystery, unpredictable, imbalance, surreal, resourceful, creative, and humor.

A Quincunx does not offer equal divisions of a circle. It represents the 150° turn angles of a dodecagram, {12/5}.

Dodecagram {12/5}

== Other minor aspects ==
=== Septile ===
S A Septile is an angle of about 51.43°, which is 1/7 of the 360° ecliptic. An orb of ±1° is allowed.

A Septile is a mystical aspect that indicates a hidden flow of energy between the involved planets. Often, it involves spiritual or energetic sensitivity as well as an inner awareness of a more subtle, hidden level of reality.

Irreducible multiples
S^{2} A Biseptile is an angle of 102.86°, which is 2/7 of the 360° ecliptic.
S^{3} A Triseptile is an angle of 154.29°, which is 3/7 of the 360° ecliptic.

Heptagram {7/2}

Heptagram {7/3}

=== Octile ===

An Octile or Semisquare is an angle of 45°, which is 1/8 of the 360° ecliptic. An orb of ±3° is allowed. The symbol is drawn with a 60-90° angle; the original angle is 90°, which is 1/2 a Square.

An Octile is an important minor aspect. It indicates stimulating or challenging energy. It is similar to a Square, but doesn't last as long as it has a smaller orb.

Irreducible Multiples

A Sesquiquadrate or Trioctile is an angle of 135°, which is 3/8 of the 360° ecliptic. An orb of ±1.5° is allowed.

A Sesquiquadrate is a harmonic of a Semisquare, which involves challenge. It is not an exact division of the 360° ecliptic. Therefore, when a Semisquare is present, it does not function as a standalone aspect, but as part of a series.

Octagram {8/3}

=== Novile ===
N A Novile is an angle of 40°, which is 1/9 of the 360° ecliptic. An orb of ±1° is allowed.

A Novile indicates an energy of perfection and/or idealization.

Irreducible Multiples
N^{2} A Binovile is an angle of 80°, which is 2/9 of the 360° ecliptic.
N^{4} A Quadnovile is an angle of 160°, which is 4/9 of the 360° ecliptic.

Enneagram {9/2}

Enneagram {9/4}

=== Decile ===
A Decile is an angle of 36°, which is 1/10 of the 360° ecliptic.

Irreducible Multiples
^{3} A Tridecile is an angle of 108°, which is 3/10 of the 360° ecliptic.

Decagram {10/3}

=== Undecile ===
U An Undecile or Elftile is an angle of 32.73°, which is 1/11 of the 360° ecliptic. An orb of ±1° is allowed.

Irreducible Multiples
U^{2} A Biundecile is an angle of 65.45°, which is 2/11 of the 360° ecliptic.
U^{3} A Triundecile is an angle of 98.18°, which is 3/11 of the 360° ecliptic.
U^{4} A Quadundecile is an angle of 130.91°, which is 4/11 of the 360° ecliptic.
U^{5} A Quinundecile is an angle of 163.63°, which is 5/11 of the 360° ecliptic.

Hendecagram {11/2}

Hendecagram {11/3}

Hendecagram {11/4}

Hendecagram {11/5}

=== Semioctile ===
A Semioctile or Sexdecile is an angle of 22.5°, which is 1/16 of the 360° ecliptic. An orb of ±0.75° is allowed.

A Semioctile is part of the square family. It is considered to be a version of the Semisquare, which triggers challenge. Its harmonic aspects are 45°, 67.5°, 90°, 112.5°, 135°, 157.5° and 180°. It was discovered by Uranian astrologers.

Irreducible Multiples
A Sesquioctile or Bisexdecile is an angle of 67.5°, which is 3/16 of the 360° ecliptic.
A Quinsemioctile or Quinsexdecile is an angle of 112.5°, which is 5/16 of the 360° ecliptic.
A Sepsemioctile or Sepsexdecile is an angle of 157.5°, which is 7/16 of the 360° ecliptic.

Hexadecagram {16/3}

Hexadecagram {16/5}

Hexadecagram {16/7}

== Declinations ==
The Parallel and Contraparallel or Antiparallel are two other aspects which refer to degrees of declination above or below the Celestial Equator. They are not widely used by astrologers.

=== Parallel and Contra Parallel ===
A The same declination of two planets. The declination is the vertical angle between a planet and the celestial equator, in a southern (S) or northern (N) direction. Planets in a parallel relationship are compared to a conjunction. A contra parallel or "split" parallel occurs when two planets have the same number of degrees of declination, but in opposite hemispheres. For example, the moon might be at 20 degrees north latitude, while Pluto appears at 20 degrees south latitude. Its meaning is similar to that of the opposition.

== See also ==
- Astrological symbols
- Conjunction
- Opposition
- Cosmobiology
- Hamburg School of Astrology
- Quadrature (astronomy)
