= Horoscope =

Astrological chart or diagram

A horoscope (or other commonly used names for the horoscope in English include natal chart, astrological chart, astro-chart, celestial map, sky-map, star-chart, cosmogram, vitasphere, radical chart, radix, chart wheel or simply chart) is an astrological chart or diagram representing the positions of the Sun, Moon, planets, astrological aspects and angles at the time of an event, such as the moment of a person's birth. The word horoscope is derived from the Greek words ōra and scopos meaning "time" and "observer" (horoskopos, pl. horoskopoi, or "marker(s) of the hour"). It is claimed by proponents of astrology that a horoscope can be used as a method of divination regarding events relating to the point in time it represents, and it forms the basis of the horoscopic traditions of astrology, although practices surrounding astrology have been recognized as pseudoscientific since the 18th century. Horoscope columns are often featured in print and online newspapers.

In common usage, horoscope often refers to an astrologer's interpretation, usually based on a system of solar Sun sign astrology, based strictly on the position of the Sun at the time of birth or on the calendar significance of an event, as in Chinese astrology. In particular, many newspapers and magazines carry predictive columns, written in prose that may be written more for increasing readership than tied directly to the Sun or other aspects of the Solar System, allegedly based on celestial influences in relation to the zodiacal placement of the Sun on the month of birth, cusp (two days before or after any particular sign, an overlap), or decant (the month divided into three ten-day periods) of the person's month of birth, identifying the individual's Sun sign or "star sign" based on the tropical zodiac.

In Hindu astrology, birth charts are called kundali, and they are claimed to be based on the movement of stars and the Moon. Auspicious events and rituals are started after checking a person's kundali, including marriage, in which the birth charts of the boy and girl are matched.The kundali further records tithi, rashi, nakshatra, and D-charts, which are analyzed to determine personality traits and to choose auspicious timings for important rituals and decisions

No scientific studies have shown support for the accuracy of horoscopes, and the methods used to make interpretations are considered examples of pseudoscience. In the modern scientific framework, no known interaction exists that could be responsible for the transmission of the alleged influence between a person and the position of stars in the sky at the moment of birth. In all tests completed, keeping strict methods to include a control group and proper blinding between experimenters and subjects, horoscopes have shown no effect beyond pure chance. Furthermore, some psychological tests have shown that it is possible to construct personality descriptions and foretelling generic enough to satisfy most members of a large audience simultaneously, referred to as the Forer or Barnum effect.

== Introduction ==
The horoscope serves as a stylized map of the heavens over a specific location at a particular moment in time. In most applications the perspective is geocentric (heliocentric astrology being one exception). The positions of the actual planets (including Sun and Moon) are placed in the chart, along with those of purely calculated factors such as the lunar nodes, the house cusps including the midheaven and the ascendant, zodiac signs, fixed stars and the lots. Angular relationships between the planets themselves and other points, called aspects, are typically determined. The emphasis and interpretation of these factors vary with tradition. This means however the stars were placed at the time of birth for a person shows their characteristics and personality, including weakness.

== Etymology ==
The Latin word horoscopus, ultimately from Greek ὡρόσκοπος "nativity, horoscope", "observer of the hour [of birth]", from ὥρα "time, hour" and σκόπος "observer, watcher". In Middle English texts from the 11th century, the word appears in the Latin form and is anglicized to horoscope in Early Modern English. The noun horoscopy for "casting of horoscopes" has been in use since the 17th century (OED). In Greek, ὡρόσκοπος in the sense of "ascendant" – not only of the time of someone's birth, but more generally of any significant event – and ὡροσκοπία "observation of the ascendant" has been in use since Ptolemy.

== Concepts in Western astrology ==
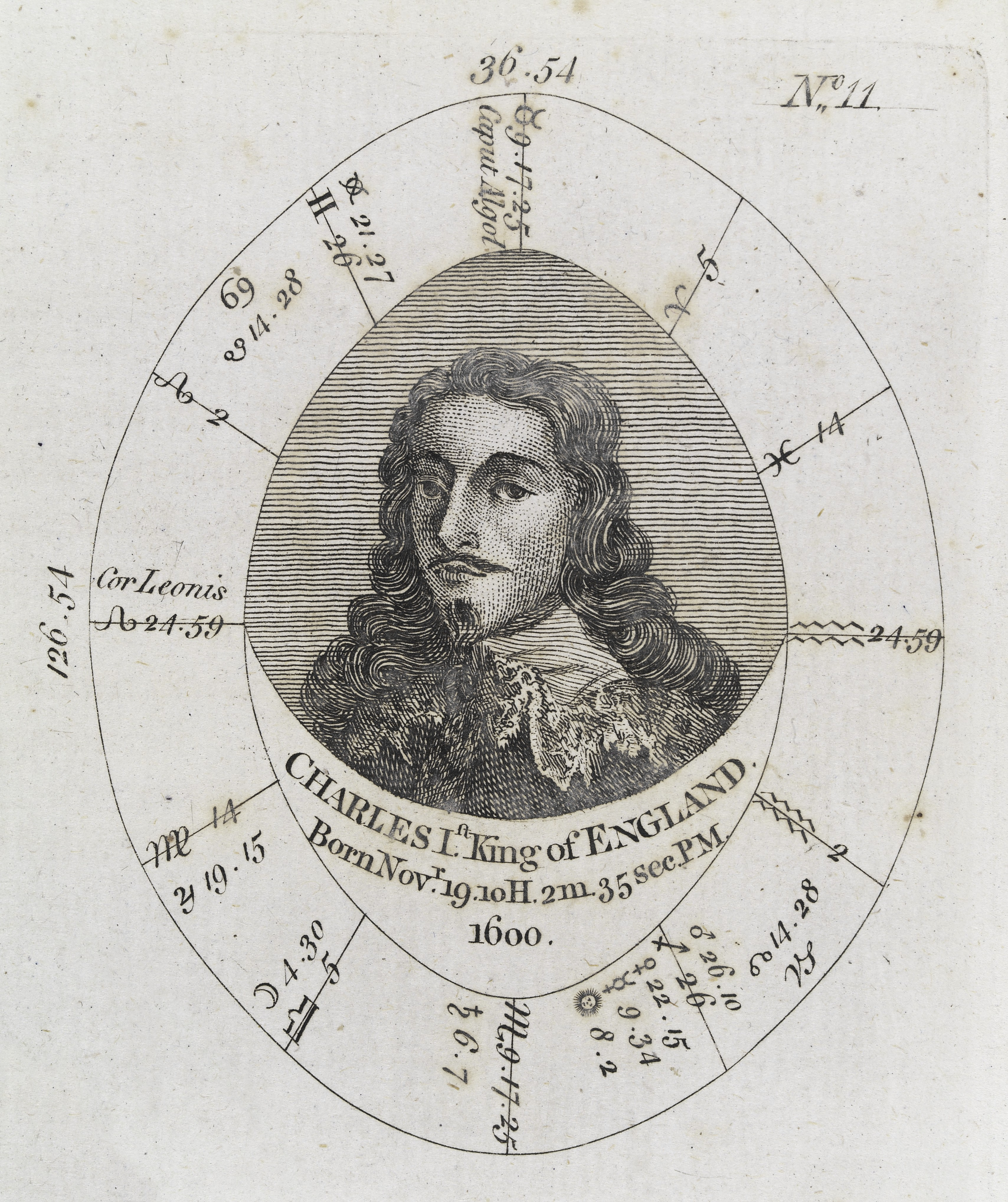
Astrological birth chart for Charles I of England

- The native is the subject of the event (a birth, for example) being charted at a particular time and place, and is considered to be at the centre of the celestial sphere.
- The celestial sphere is an imaginary sphere onto which the zodiac, constellations and planets are projected, loosely based on the view of the sky above from Earth.
- The plane of the equator is the plane of the Earth's equator projected into space.
- The plane of the ecliptic is defined by the orbits of the Earth and the Sun. For practical purposes, the plane of the equator and the plane of the ecliptic maintain a constant inclination to each other of approximately 23.5°.
- The plane of the horizon is centred on the native, and is tangential to the Earth at that point. In a sphere whose radius is infinitely large, this plane may be treated as nearly equivalent to the parallel plane, with its centre at the Earth's centre. This greatly simplifies the geometry of the horoscope, but does not take into account that the native is in motion. Some writers on astrology have thus considered the effects of parallax, but most would agree that (apart from that of the Moon) they are relatively minor.

=== Angles ===
There are four primary angles in the horoscope which are thought to influence key areas and moments in a native's lifetime, or within a given day or time. These are, in order of power:

- First House (Ascendant, East Angle, rising sign, or ASC/AC)
- Tenth House (Midheaven, Medi Coeli (midheaven), North Angle, MC)
- Seventh House (Descendant, West Angle, setting sign, DSC/DC)
- Fourth House (Imum Coeli – South Angle, lower-heaven, IC)

The ascendant is the easternmost (or sunrise point) where the ecliptic and horizon intersect; the ascendant and the midheaven are considered the most important angles in the horoscope by the vast majority of astrologers. In most systems of house division, the ASC is the cusp of the 1st house and the MC is the cusp of the 10th house.

Generally, on an astrological chart, each of these four angles are roughly 90° from the next, forming a cross shape (two oppositions, 180° each, forming a 360° sphere). This cross formation is made up of the points of east-west, north-south, or 1st house-7th house, 10th house-4th house (give or take, based on speed of orbit and degree). A simplistic comparison would be a clock face, with the 1st house and 7th house being placed at 9 and 3 o'clock, and the 10th and 4th houses placed at 12 and 6 o'clock, respectively. The placement of the planetary ruler of the ascendant, called the Chart Ruler, is also considered to be significant; The point in the west diametrically opposing the ascendant is called the descendant, normally the cusp of the 7th house; and the point opposing the MC is the cusp of the 4th house, the northernmost point of the chart, called the Imum Coeli or IC.

In creating a horoscope, the ascendant is traditionally placed at the "nine o'clock" position on the left-hand side of the chart wheel (though traditional rectangular chart formats need not follow this convention). During the course of a day, because of the Earth's rotation, the entire circle of the ecliptic will pass through the ascendant and will be advanced by about 1°. In an astrological chart, the ascendant progresses and changes zodiac signs roughly every two hours (give or take), advancing about one degree every five minutes. This movement provides us with the term "rising" sign, which is the sign of the zodiac "rising" over the eastern horizon at the moment of birth. This point is thought to affect how we are perceived by others, based on the zodiac sign on the ascendant at the time of birth. The point on the ecliptic that is 90° above the plane of the horizon at the time is called the Midheaven, or Medium Coeli (MC), placed at the "twelve o'clock position" effectively where the Sun would be if the birth time was midday. This area is thought to have greatest significance on one's career and public image.

=== The Zodiac ===
The astrological symbols/glyphs used in Western astrology to represent the astrological signs (Zodiac)

The Zodiac, or "circle of animals" is a zone or belt in space projected onto the celestial sphere through which, from our viewpoint, the planets move. A symbolic geometric construction around 16 degrees wide, it is divided into 12 signs, each of 30 degrees longitude (making 360 degrees, a full circle), with the ecliptic, the apparent path of the Sun, as its middle line. The tropical zodiac used by most Western astrologers has its beginning at the exact moment that the Sun crosses the celestial equator and enters the zodiacal sign of Aries. Some Western astrologers use the sidereal zodiac favored by Indian ("Jyotish") astrologers, which is based more closely on actual positions of constellations in the heavens, as opposed to the tropical zodiac, which is a moveable format based on the seasons.

The tropical zodiac defines the vernal point (the first day of spring in the northern hemisphere) as the first degree of Aries, but the sidereal zodiac allows it to precess. This difference may cause confusion among beginner and casual astrologers. Because of a "wobble" in the Earth's axis of rotation over a period of about 26,000 years (often called a "great year"), the rate at which the vernal equinox precesses in the heavens is approximately 0 deg, 0 min, 50.23 seconds a year, drifting by one degree every 72 years. Precession of the equinoxes thus occurs at a rate of roughly 5 arc minutes of a degree every 6 years. The tropical signs relate to the seasons and not the stars. Here is an example: a person born on, say August 28, 2002, would come to understand that their Sun sign was in Virgo according to Western astrology (conventional Sun sign dates August 23, to September 22, of every year), but Sun on that same calendar date of the year 2002 was in the constellation Leo (where it had been since August 10, 2002, and would remain until September 15, when it would then finally cross into Virgo).

The sidereal signs and the tropical signs are both geometrical conventions of 30° each, whereas the zodiacal constellations are pictorial representations of mythological figures projected onto the celestial sphere based on patterns of visible star groupings, none of which occupy precisely 30° of the ecliptic. So constellations and signs are not the same, although for historical reasons they might have the same names.

Some astrologers do not use the signs of the zodiac at all, focusing more instead on the astrological aspects and other features of the horoscope. The sun sign is the sign of the zodiac in which the Sun is located for the native. This is the single astrological fact familiar to most people. If an event occurs at sunrise the ascendant and sun sign will be the same; other rising signs can then be estimated at two-hour intervals from there. A cusp is the boundary between two signs or houses. For some, the cusp includes a small portion of the two signs or houses under consideration.

== Construction of a horoscope in Western astrology ==
To create a horoscope, an astrologer first has to ascertain the exact time and place of the subject's birth, or the initiation of an event. The local standard time (adjusting for any daylight saving time or war time) is then converted into Greenwich Mean Time or Universal Time at that same instant. The astrologer then has to convert this into the local sidereal time at birth in order to be able to calculate the ascendant and midheaven. The astrologer will next consult a set of tables called an ephemeris, which lists the location of the Sun, Moon and planets for a particular year, date and sidereal time, with respect to the northern hemisphere vernal equinox or the fixed stars (depending on which astrological system is being used). The astrologer then adds or subtracts the difference between the longitude of Greenwich and the longitude of the place in question to determine the true local mean time (LMT) at the place of birth to show where planets would be visible above the horizon at the precise time and place in question. Planets hidden from view beneath the Earth are also shown in the horoscope.

Using the above process, practitioners of astrology commonly construct a composite chart when two people meet and form a relationship. According to astrologers, the composite chart will give clues as to the nature and function of the relationship.

The horoscope features 12 sectors around the circle of the ecliptic, starting from the eastern horizon with the ascendant or rising sign. These 12 sectors are called the houses and numerous systems for calculating these divisions exist. Tables of houses have been published since the 19th Century to make this otherwise demanding task easier.

=== Houses ===
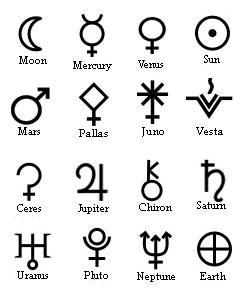
The astrological symbols/glyphs used in Western astrology to represent the planets in astrology

The chart thus begins with a framework of 12 houses. Upon this the signs of the zodiac are superimposed. In the equal house system the cusp between any two houses will fall at the same degree for each of them: at 12° of Leo, the second house will begin at 12° of Virgo, the third at 12° Libra, and so on. In house systems that take into consideration the effects of the angle of intersection between the planes of the horizon and the ecliptic, the calculations are more complicated. For these calculations it is essential to know the latitude of the event. Tables are available for these calculations, but they are now commonly calculated by computer. Most astrology computer programs allow the user to choose from a variety of house systems.

=== Placements of the planets ===
Having established the relative positions of the signs in the houses, the astrologer positions the Sun, Moon, and planets at their proper celestial longitudes. Some astrologers also take note of minor planetary bodies, fixed stars, asteroids (for example, Chiron) and other mathematically calculated points and angles such as the vertex, equatorial ascendant, etc. Many astrologers also use what are commonly referred to as Arabic parts (or Greek Lots), the most common of which is the Part of Fortune (Pars Fortunae).

=== Aspects ===
To complete the horoscope the astrologer will consider the aspects or relative angles between pairs of planets. More exact aspects are considered more important. The difference between the exact aspect and the actual aspect is called the orb. Those generally recognized by the astrological community are Conjunction (0°), Opposition (180°), Square (90°), Trine (120°), Sextile (60°), Semi-Square (45°), Sesquisquare (135°), and Quincunx (150°). Understandably these aspects are more significant when they are exact, but they are considered to function within an orb of influence, the size of which varies according to the importance of each aspect. Thus conjunctions are believed to operate with a larger orb than sextiles. Most modern astrologers use an orb of 8° or less for aspects involving the Sun, Moon, and Jupiter and smaller orbs for the other points. Some astrologers, such as practitioners of Cosmobiology, and Uranian astrology, use minor aspects (15°, 22.5°, 67.5°, 72°, 75°, 105°, 112.5°, 157.5°, 165°) with much narrower orbs.

The major astrological system regarded universally is Vedic Hindu Astrology. As per this, all planets see just opposite i.e. 180 degree aspect. But Mars, Jupiter, and Saturn have special aspects. Mars sees the houses 4th and 8 too from its place in the horoscope, Saturn sees the houses 3 and 10 too from its place, and Jupiter sees 5 and 9 from its place in the horoscope i.e. the house in which they are posited in the lagna chart.

=== Ascendant ===
The ascendant (ASC) is a point on the ecliptic that rises on the eastern horizon at sunrise and changes as the earth rotates on its axis. The ascendant is very important in astrological chart interpretation. It exerts more power than the Sun, Moon and planets because it infiltrates everything in the natal chart. The ascendant is the first point of energy in the natal chart and it represents the way we view life. The sign on the ascendant characterises our expression of "who we are" when dealing with others, and our initial action when dealing with day-to-day concerns. Longitude is necessary in order to determine the position of the Ascendant because horoscopes use local time. Having constructed the horoscope, the astrologer can begin the task of interpreting the chart. This interpretation depends upon which branch of horoscopic astrology is being used.

== Chinese horoscopes ==
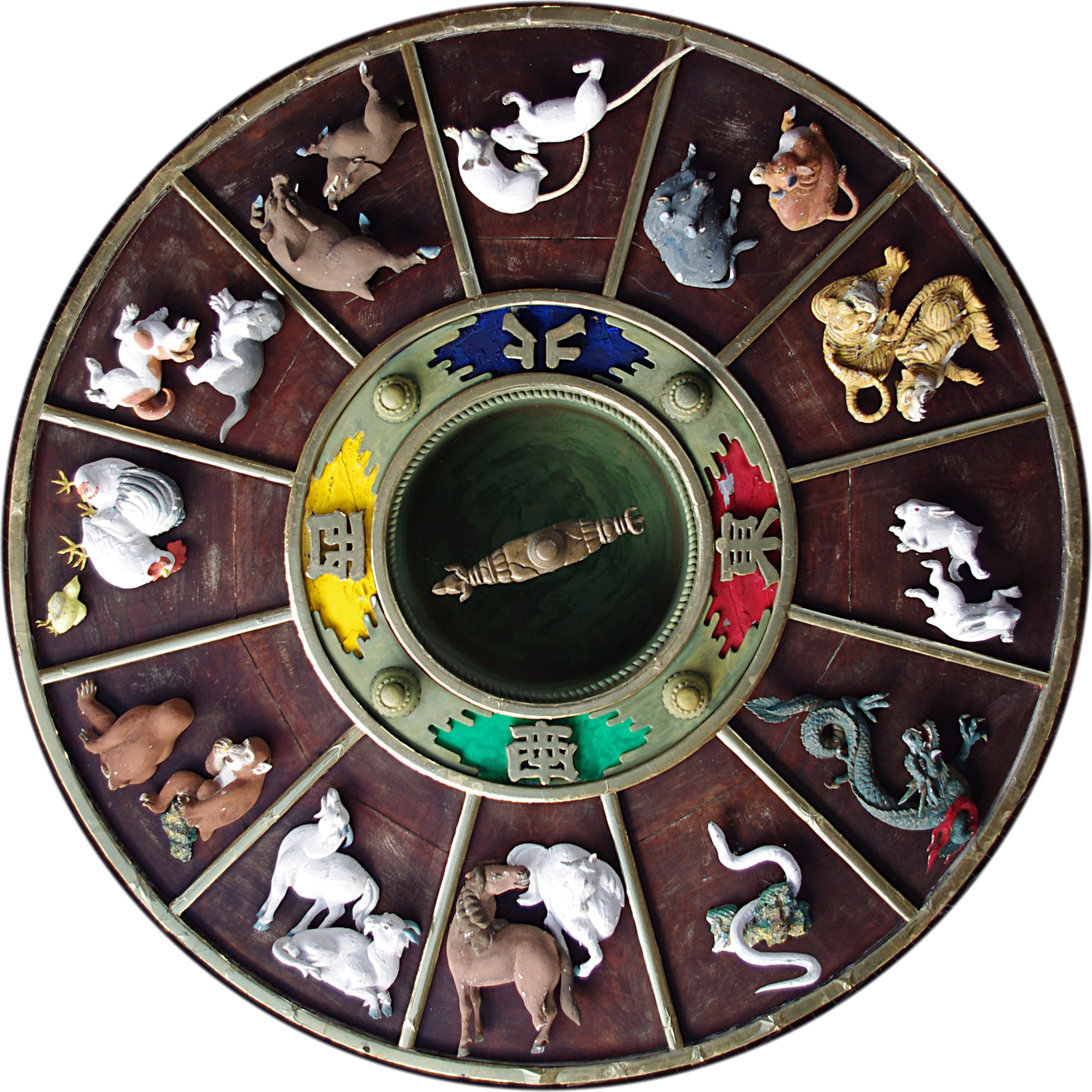
The 12 Chinese zodiac animals

In Chinese astrology, horoscopes are based on the symbolism of the Chinese zodiac, a system of elements and animals associated with each year according to a Sexagenary cycle. Chinese horoscopes often appear in horoscope sections in newspapers and magazine alongside Western horoscopes.

== Criticism ==
Interest in horoscopes and the zodiac sign have been very popular throughout history and today. There are many faithful followers, from celebrities to the general public.

=== Psychological criticism ===
Natal birth charts, or zodiac signs, are often used to predict a person's personality traits. However, the use of natal birth charts to predict personality is not valid or reliable. In a double-blind study that tested the zodiac's reliability to predict personality, an astrologer had to match a person's zodiac sign to their CPI (California Psychological Inventory) result. The CPI is a reliable method to determine an individual's personality. It was found that the astrologers were not able to correctly match the zodiac sign to the CPI result beyond random assignment. This means that astrology is no more than a test of chance and it is not a reliable way to predict personality.

Similarly, the zodiac sign can be used to create horoscopes that predict the events that will happen in an individual's life. However, like using the zodiac sign for personality traits, using it for horoscopes is also unreliable. One astrologer's prediction for a horoscope is typically completely unrelated to the prediction of another astrologer. However, many people still believe their horoscope perfectly aligns with the events in their lives. There are some possible explanations for this. Horoscopes have vague wording and are based on typical everyday activities. Due to this, it is easier for people to relate to these claims and increase their belief that it is a real science. Also, a person's expectations typically lead them to bias the way they perceive information, so their expectations are confirmed. In a study, participant's horoscopes were paired with the events of their previous day. When the horoscopes were presented with the participant's zodiac sign, other participants were more likely to report that the horoscope matched the previous day's events compared to when their zodiac sign was not present. This shows how individuals will bias their perceptions based on the expectations. This makes horoscopes seem reliable, when they are not valid.

=== Scientific criticism ===
Although it has its proponents, astrology has been rejected by the scientific community. Some horoscopes base their predictions on the "movement" of stars. However, this is inaccurate as stars actually do not move but appear to because the Earth rotates on its axis and orbits around the Sun. Furthermore, none of the answers given by astrology are actually based on science. According to American astronomer, the reason why people rely on horoscopes is explained by a psychological phenomenon known as "self-selection bias", which is the tendency of humans to look for interpretations or confirmations for what they already hope to be true. Hence, the reason why astrology may seem like it works is because human brains are wired to look for patterns, even when none exists. Many practitioners of astrology claim that astrology is indeed a science however, despite many trial and experiments, the effectiveness and scientific evidence of astrology is still yet to be demonstrated. In conclusion, astrology has no verifiable mechanism behind it and astrologers follow no sort of scientific method in their process hence it cannot be classified as science.

=== Religion ===
In Christianity, many say that people should not use horoscopes or practice astrology in general, citing Deuteronomy 4:19, Deuteronomy 18:10–12, and Isaiah 47:13–14 from the Bible. Evangelist and minister Billy Graham said, "God did make the stars (as well as everything else in the universe), but he intended them to be a witness to his power and glory, not as a means to guide us or foretell the future."

The Catechism of the Catholic Church maintains that divination, including predictive astrology, is incompatible with modern Catholic beliefs such as free will:

All forms of divination are to be rejected: recourse to Satan or demons, conjuring up the dead or other practices falsely supposed to "unveil" the future. Consulting horoscopes, astrology, palm reading, interpretation of omens and lots, the phenomena of clairvoyance, and recourse to mediums all conceal a desire for power over time, history, and, in the last analysis, other human beings, as well as a wish to conciliate hidden powers. They contradict the honor, respect, and loving fear that we owe to God alone.

— Catechism of the Catholic Church

== See also ==
- Forer Effect
- Kundali
- Synoptical horoscope
- Mars Effect
