= Ascendant =

Astrological sign on the eastern horizon at birth

The ascendant in this example is marked Asc and is usually in the nine o'clock position of the horoscope.

The ascendant (A^{sc}, Asc or As) or rising sign is the astrological sign on the eastern horizon when the person was born. It signifies a person's physical appearance, and awakening consciousness.

Because the ascendant is specific to a particular time and place, to astrologers it signifies the individual environment and conditioning that a person receives during their upbringing, and also the circumstances of their childhood. For this reason, astrologers consider that the ascendant is also concerned with how a person has learned to present themself to the world, especially in public and in impersonal situations.

== History ==
Although Babylonian astronomers observed the actual rising times of the signs, there is no specific mention of the ascendant in the texts that have survived on clay tablets. By the 3rd century BCE, Egyptians looked at the rising of specific asterisms to identify the ascending sign and get an approximate time of night, and that is reflected in the name subsequently given by the Greeks to the ascendant: horoskopos, or "hour marker." ὡρόσκοπος in the sense of "ascendant," and ὡροσκοπία, "observation of the ascendant," was used in the Greek manuscript of Ptolemy's Tetrabiblos. First documented mention of an ascendent contained in the works by Balbilus.

== Vedic astrology ==
In Vedic astrology (also known as Jyotisha), the ascendant is referred to as the Lagna. It is the sign rising on the eastern horizon at the time of birth and serves as the starting point of the horoscope. The entire chart, including house placements and planetary influences, is built around the Lagna. It reflects the native's physical body, general health, and how they interact with the outer world.

The ruling planet of the Lagna sign is called the Lagnesha or ascendant lord. It plays a central role in interpreting a person's nature, life direction, and important events. A strong Lagna and Lagnesha are said to contribute to vitality, stability, and personal strength. In predictive astrology, the placement of the Lagna lord, its aspects, and dignity are closely analyzed.

== Calculation ==
The ascendant, from an astrological point of view, is the value of the ecliptical geocentric longitude (or celestial longitude, λ) which is easterly on the horizon. This intersection of the horizon with the ecliptic can be calculated from:

$\lambda_{\rm Asc}= \arctan \left(\frac{y}{x} \right)= \arctan \left(\frac{-\cos\theta_{\rm L}}{\sin\theta_{\rm L} \cos\varepsilon + \tan\phi \sin\varepsilon} \right)$

where $\theta_{\rm L}$ is the local sidereal time in degrees, $\varepsilon$ is the inclination of Earth's equatorial plane to the ecliptic (axial tilt). For values referred to the standard equinox J2000.0 use $\varepsilon$ = 23.4392911°; for J1950.0 use $\varepsilon$ = 23.4457889°. $\phi$ is the observer's terrestrial latitude (southern latitudes are negative, northern positive). The ascendant is then found in the correct quadrant (0° to 360°) by using the two rules.

If (x < 0) then
    Ascendant = Ascendant + 180
else
    Ascendant = Ascendant + 360

By definition of ascendant, we have to take the point easterly (the rising one, less than 180° from the midheaven) by using a final rule:

if (Ascendant < 180) then
    Ascendant = Ascendant + 180
else
    Ascendant = Ascendant - 180

Otherwise a direct result in the correct quadrant can be determined if calculator or programming software has the atan2(y,x) math function and then using the last rule.

For latitudes north of the Arctic Circle (or south of the Antarctic Circle), the ascendant function has two discontinuity points, occurring at instants where the horizon and the ecliptic planes do not intersect. Between those instants, the ascendant's longitude actually decreases.

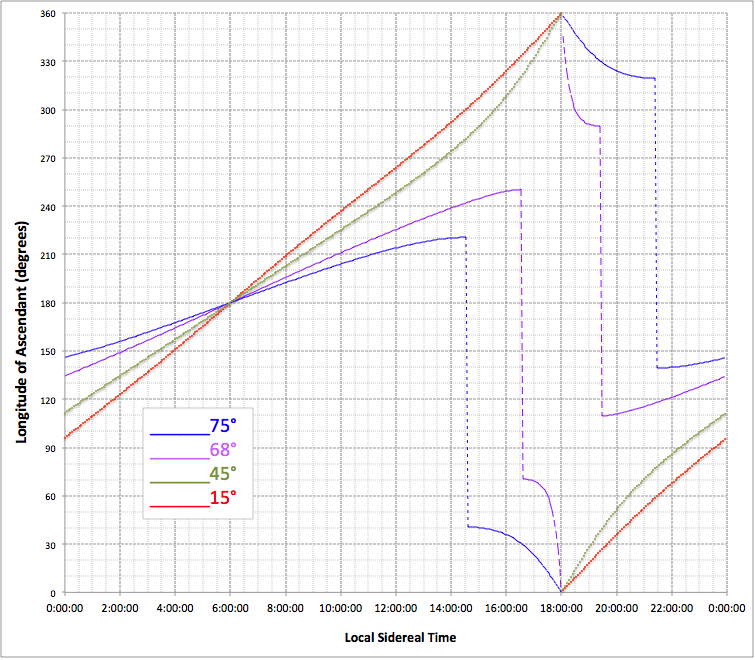
Longitude of ascendant at different northern latitudes. Above the Arctic Circle, discontinuity occurs when the horizon is parallel to the ecliptic.

== Long and short ascension ==
Because the Earth's axis is tilted relative to the ecliptic (see axial tilt), the twelve signs do not take the same amount of time to cross the eastern horizon. At the equator, there is very little difference (Pisces, Aries, Virgo and Libra take slightly less time than the other signs), but as one moves from the equator, larger and larger differences emerge.

In the northern hemisphere, the signs of Capricorn, Aquarius, Pisces, Aries, Taurus and Gemini take much less time than the theoretical two hours to cross the eastern horizon, whilst the signs of Cancer, Leo, Virgo, Libra, Scorpio and Sagittarius take much longer than two hours to do so. For example, at the latitude of Paris, France:

- Pisces and Aries take only one hour to cross the eastern horizon (this is referred to as the length of ascension, or simply as the sign's ascension).
- Aquarius and Taurus have an ascension of one hour and fifteen minutes.
- Capricorn and Gemini have an ascension of one hour and fifty minutes.
- Cancer and Sagittarius have an ascension of two hours and thirty minutes.
- Leo and Scorpio have an ascension of two hours and forty minutes.
- Virgo and Libra have an ascension of two hours and forty-five minutes.

At higher latitudes, these differences become even more marked. At the latitude of St. Petersburg, Russia:

- Pisces and Aries have an ascension of thirty-five minutes.
- Aquarius and Taurus have an ascension of forty-five minutes.
- Capricorn and Gemini have an ascension of one hour and twenty-five minutes.
- Cancer and Sagittarius have an ascension of two hours and forty minutes.
- Leo and Scorpio have an ascension of three hours and fifteen minutes.
- Virgo and Libra have an ascension of three hours and twenty minutes.

Astrologers consider the differences between the rate at which the signs ascend to be of importance. In many house systems, houses can become very large when they cover Aquarius, Pisces, Aries and Taurus because these signs are seen to be much smaller from the perspective of a northern hemisphere observer.

Some astrologers, such as Richard Nolle, consider the preponderance of ascendants in signs from Cancer through Sagittarius (known as the western signs) to be symbolic of the relationship-oriented character inherent in the northern hemisphere and ascendants in the signs from Capricorn through Gemini (known as the eastern signs) to be symbolic of the more individual-oriented character in the southern hemisphere.

In the southern hemisphere, long and short ascension are reversed. For instance, at the latitude of Concepción, Chile:

- Pisces and Aries ascend in two hours and thirty minutes.
- Aquarius and Taurus ascend in two hours and twenty-five minutes.
- Capricorn and Gemini ascend in two hours and fifteen minutes.
- Sagittarius and Cancer ascend in two hours.
- Scorpio and Leo ascend in one hour and thirty-five minutes.
- Libra and Virgo ascend in one hour and fifteen minutes.

== Effects of polar astrology ==
At the Arctic and Antarctic circles, at roughly 66.5° north and south latitude respectively, a degree of the ecliptic becomes circumpolar. If the sun, for example, occupies that degree, it will neither rise nor set, but will lie upon the horizon for twenty-four hours. As we move into higher latitudes, more and more degrees of the ecliptic will neither rise nor set until, at the north pole, none of them will rise or set, and therefore none of them can become the ascendant, although no human being could be born exactly at the north pole, since it is a dimensionless point. Therefore, the omission of extreme latitudes from most house tables due to the added complexity of calculating the ascendant implies that there is no ascendant at these latitudes. This is of course untrue, yet there is a limitation on the degrees that can ascend at extreme latitudes and a further restriction on degrees that can form house cusps in time-based house systems. The simpler and earlier ecliptic-based house systems can form house cusps at extreme latitudes based on the available ascendant and midheaven degrees.

== Effects of the ascendant ==
There are a couple of factors that influence how strong or weak a force the ascendant may be in the chart.

- It is generally believed that the closer to the beginning of the sign the ascendant falls, the stronger it will be. This is because most of the first house will fall into that sign. If the ascendant falls late in a sign, most of the first house will fall into the following sign and thus weaken the effect of the ascendant's power.
- The ascendant is thought to be stronger in influence when the sun is in a weak position in the chart. For example, it is traditionally believed that the sun is in a weaker position when it is placed at the bottom of the chart, near the imum coeli or IC. This is because the sun was literally on the other side of the earth when the subject was born, hidden from view.
- According to some, the sun may also be weaker in influence if it is unaspected; in other words, if it forms no major aspects (conjunction, opposition, trine, square or sextile) to the other planets. According to other astrological observations, unaspected suns and planets show greater than usual effect and are more free.
- The sun in a sign that is intercepted, meaning it does not have a house cusp, may also be weaker and put more emphasis on the ascendant and house cusp of the solar house in such a chart.

Another factor concerning the effect of the ascendant is the theory that people become more like their sun sign after around 29 years old, as they grow older and more confident, as the sun embodies essential ego energy and self-esteem, and thus perhaps have less of a need to present a public face to others. It is also theorised that when the progressed ascendant moves into the following sign, it weakens the influence of the natal ascendant.

== Planets and the ascendant ==
Planets have added importance in the birth chart due to their relationship to the ascendant. The planet that rules the astrological sign of the ascendant is called the chart ruler and is said to be of particular importance. So for example, if the ascendant sign is Gemini, Mercury will be the chart ruler, and so "set the tone" for the chart in many ways. In addition, the planet nearest the ascendant, especially located in the first house, is usually called the rising planet and has a particular significance in the chart. However, if a planet in the twelfth house is very close to (within one or two degrees of) the ascendant, then it can be interpreted as the rising planet instead. If a planet is actually in conjunction with the ascendant (within the same degree as the ascendant), it then becomes vitally important in its effect on the personality, to the extent of being as important as the sun. Finally, any planets in the first house will always have an added emphasis.

== Modes of the ascendant ==
The effect of the ascendant varies according to the modes of the sign in which it is placed. These relate to the quality of the part of the season they occur in.

=== Ascendant cardinal signs ===
Aries, Cancer, Libra and Capricorn are cardinal signs. The effect of these signs on the ascendant is to emphasize initiative, assertiveness and to some extent leadership.

=== Ascendant fixed signs ===
Taurus, Leo, Scorpio and Aquarius are fixed signs. The effect of these signs on the ascendant is to emphasize stability, steadiness and commitment.

=== Ascendant mutable signs ===
Gemini, Virgo, Sagittarius and Pisces are mutable signs. The effect of these signs on the ascendant is to emphasize adaptability, dexterity, change and flexibility.

== Elements of the ascendant ==
Regarding the classification of signs according to the four classical elements (Fire, Earth, Air and Water), the ascendant can be:

=== Ascendant fire signs ===
The fire signs of Aries, Leo and Sagittarius are noted for their energy, enthusiasm and optimism. When a fire sign is on the ascendant the outer manner is friendly, uncritical and non-hostile. They typically send out friendly but serious and competent signals which draw out a friendly and rather respectful response from others. Aries rising gives out a well-organized, slightly stern bearing. Leo rising subjects have a dignified and rather formal manner which inspires confidence, while Sagittarius risers have a cheerful, pleasant and rather witty outer manner which suits all kinds of situations.

=== Ascendant earth signs ===
Taurus, Virgo and Capricorn ascendants are usually considered calm and stress-resistant individuals. The effect of the earth sign ascendant make people more material, reserved and collected, they don't tend to show their emotions and can be or appear to be cold. This particular effect is manifested to the least extent in Taurus sign. Each of the earth signs ascendants are usually thrifty and good with planning things beforehand.

=== Ascendant air signs ===
The air signs of Gemini, Libra and Aquarius are noted for their communication skills. When an air sign is on the ascendant the subject is friendly and sociable, but also independent and somewhat detached. The Gemini riser is constantly busy, fully engaged in a kind of juggling act, with at least a dozen activities on the go at any one time. The Libra riser occupies themself with business schemes which often need the aid of a more earthy partner to make them come to fruition. The Aquarius riser makes wonderful plans for themselves or others and may even carry some of them out.

=== Ascendant water signs ===
The water signs of Cancer, Scorpio and Pisces are noted for their emotion, intuition and feeling. When a water sign is on the ascendant the subject will hide their true feelings and have a strong need to protect themselves from the world around them. What you see is often not what you get with water ascendants. In other words, the signals they send out are consciously or unconsciously chosen for effect. Cancerians appear chatty and helpful and they do well in any situation that requires tact. Scorpio risers can use many different forms of camouflage with people they do not know, one of their favourites being offensiveness and an off-putting manner. Pisces risers appear soft, gentle, self-sacrificing and sometimes even helpless, but this is misleading, as they will fight strongly for what they think is right. Pisces are also known to be highly emotional and the most intuitive of the twelve signs.

== See also ==
- Angle (astrology)
  - Equatorial ascendant
  - Descendant
  - Midheaven
  - Imum coeli
  - House (astrology)
