= Scorpio (astrology) =

Eighth astrological sign of the zodiac

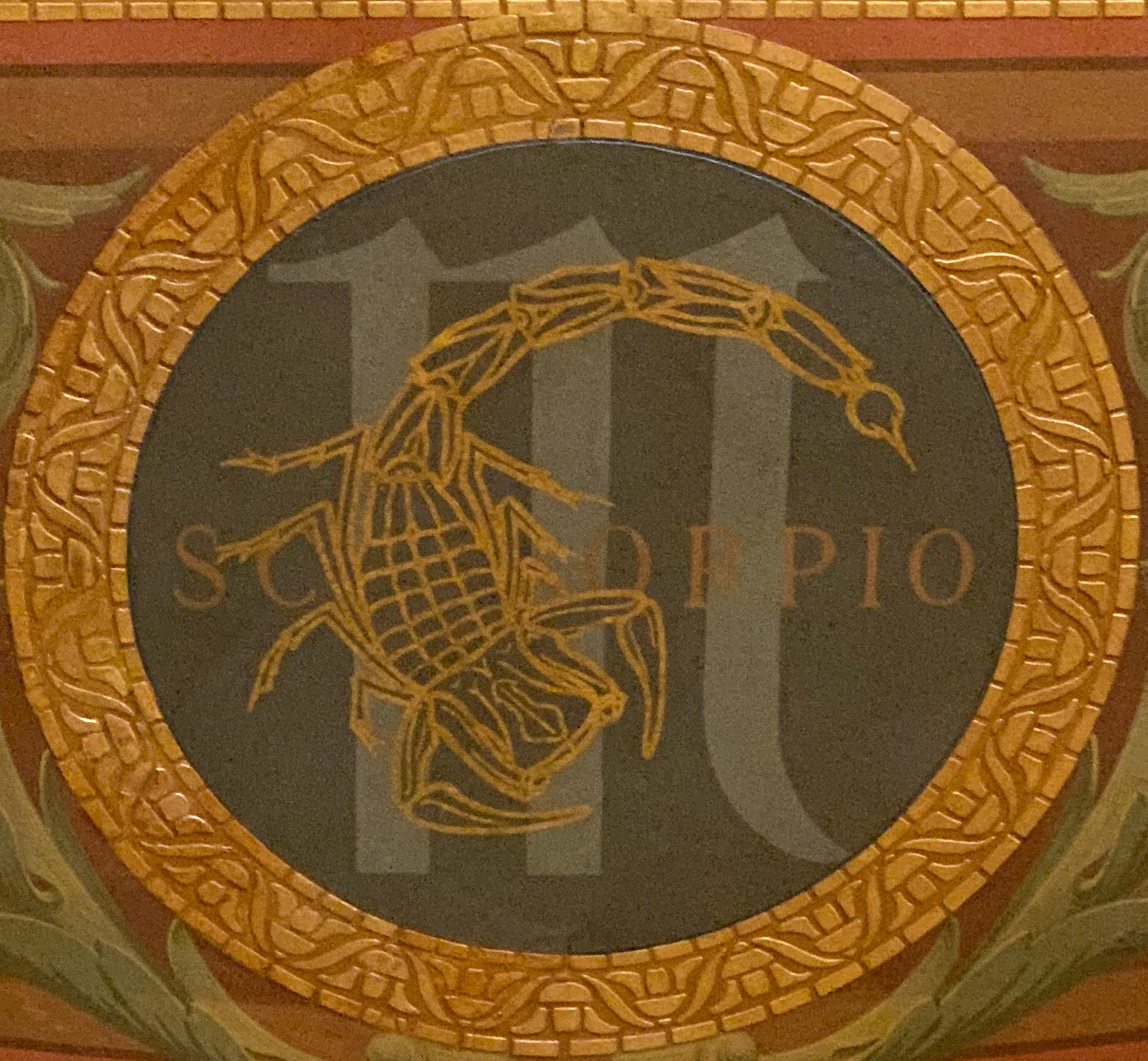
- Zodiac symbol: Scorpion
- Duration (tropical, western): October 23 – November 22 (2026, UT1)
- Constellation: Scorpius
- Zodiac element: Water
- Zodiac quality: Fixed
- Sign ruler: Mars (traditional), Pluto (modern), Ketu (descending lunar node; Vedic astrology)
- Detriment: Venus
- Exaltation: Uranus (modern)
- Fall: Moon

Scorpio (♏︎; Ancient Greek: Σκορπιός, romanized: Skorpiós, Latin for "scorpion") is the eighth astrological sign in the zodiac, originating from the constellation of Scorpius. It spans 210–240° ecliptic longitude. Under the tropical zodiac (most commonly used in Western astrology), the Sun transits this sign on average from October 23 to November 21. Depending on which zodiac system one uses, someone born under the influence of Scorpio may be called a Scorpio or Scorpionic.

== Associations ==
Scorpio is one of the three water signs, the others being Cancer and Pisces. It is the third fixed sign, after Taurus and Leo. Scorpio is also considered a negative or feminine sign. According to The Astrology Bible, Scorpio's colors are deep red, maroon, black, and brown.

== Myth ==
According to Greek mythology, its representation as a scorpion is related to the Greek legend of Orion and how a giant scorpion stung him to death (said to be why Orion sets as Scorpius rises in the sky). Another Greek myth recounts how a scorpion caused the horses of the Sun to bolt, when they were being driven by the inexperienced youth, Phaethon.

== Gallery ==
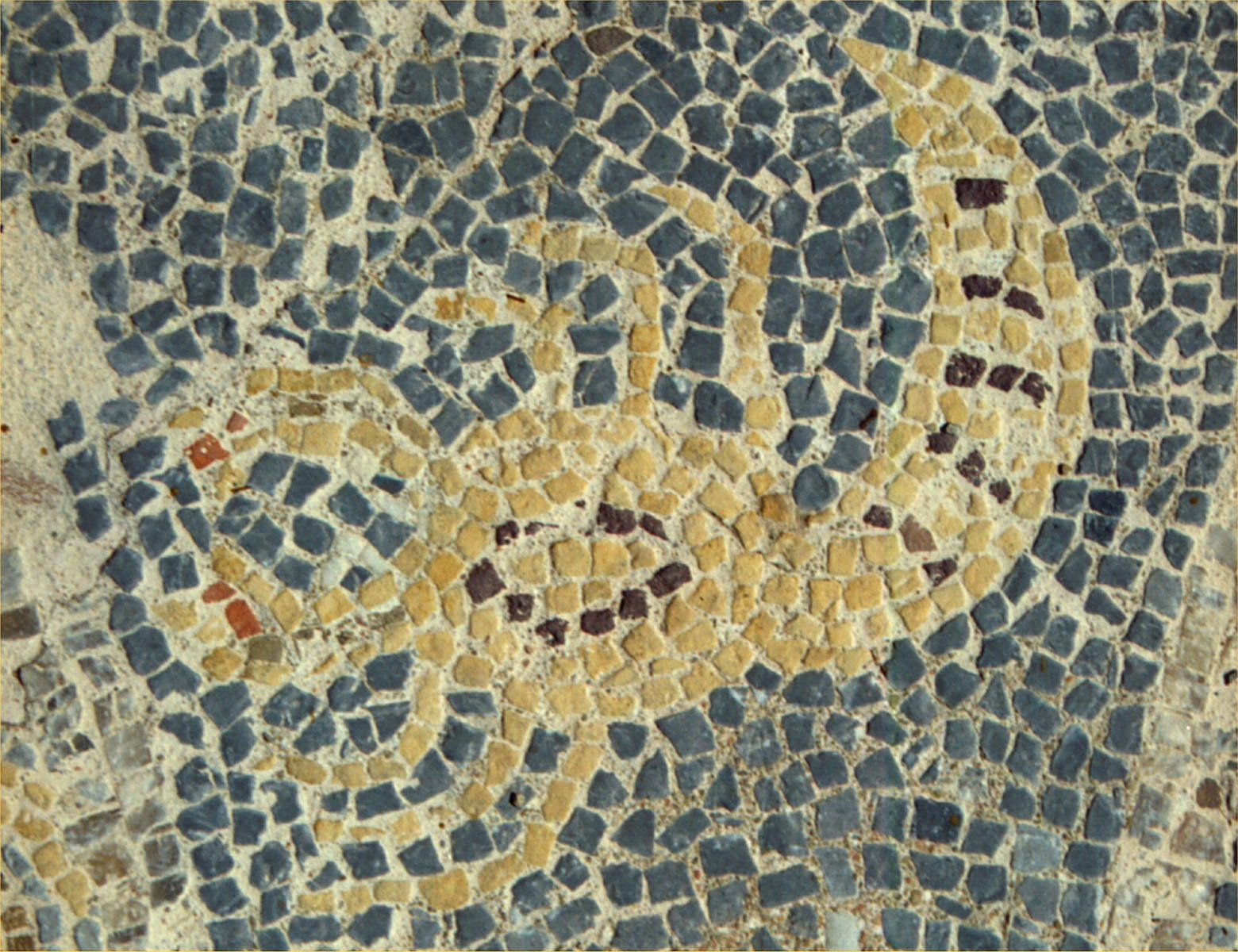
Mosaic in Maltezana near Analipsi, Astypalaia, 5th century CE

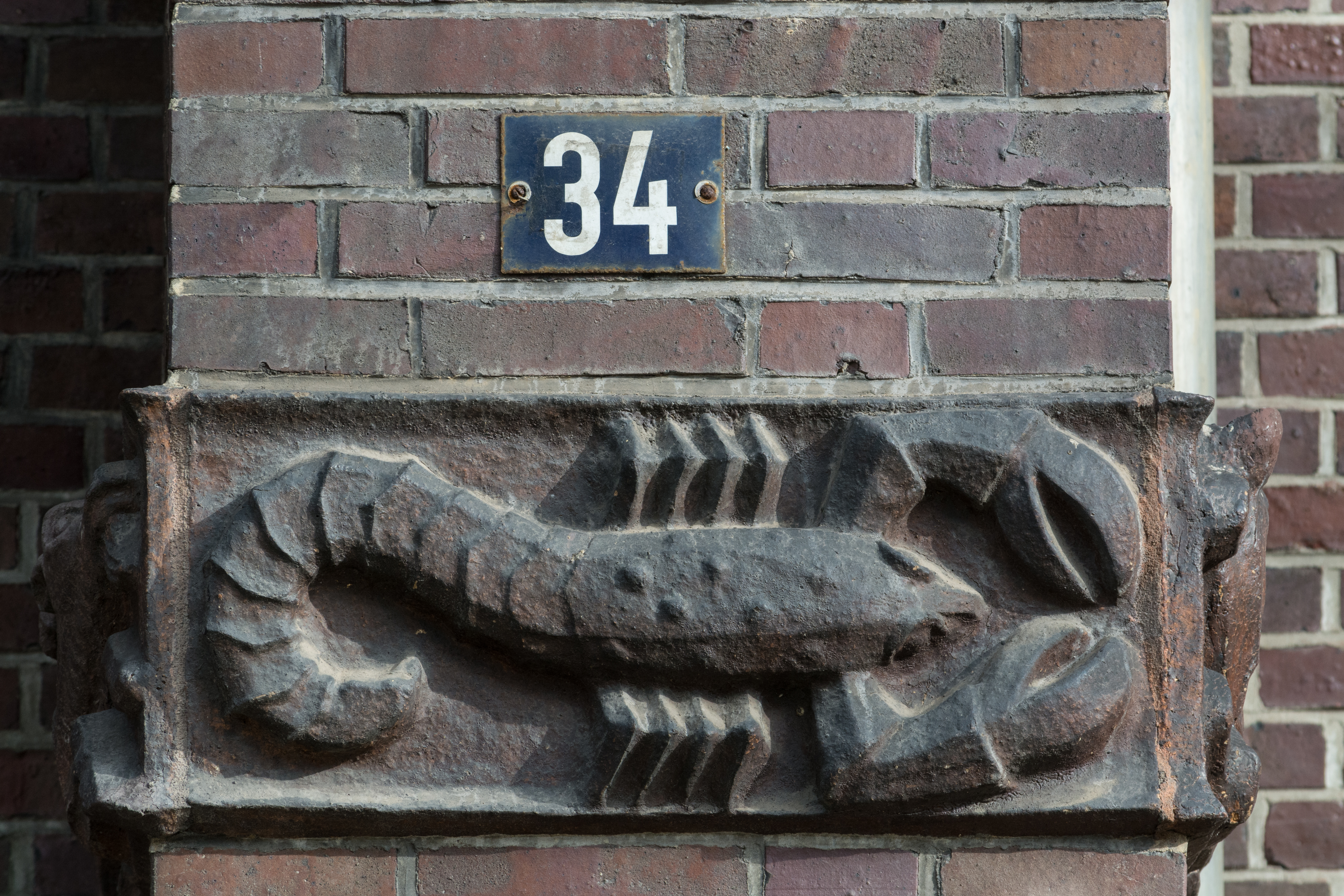
Scorpio adorning a building in Hamburg, Germany, designed by sculptor Richard Kuöhl

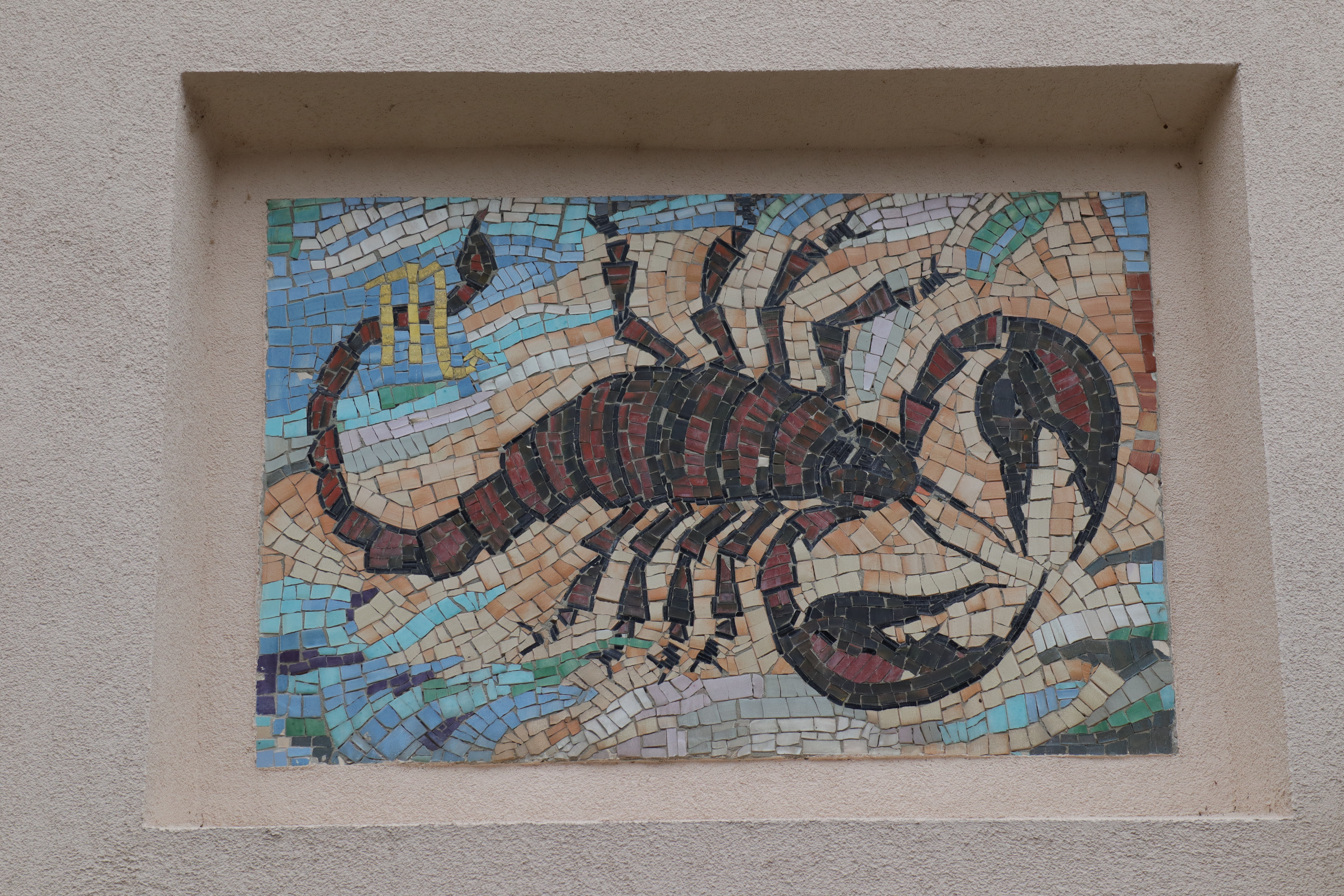
A mosaic in a residential complex in the Jedlesee district of Vienna

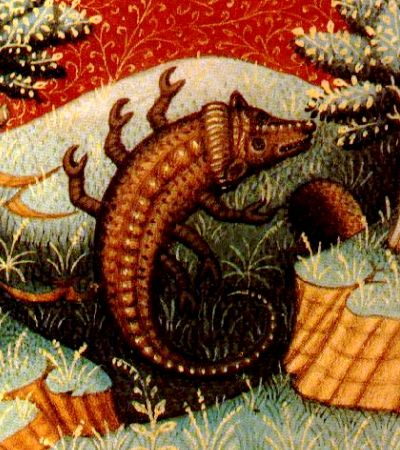

== See also ==
- Astronomical symbols
- Chinese zodiac
- Circle of stars
- Cusp (astrology)
- Elements of the zodiac
- Hindu astrology
- Water (classical element)

== Works cited ==
- Allen, Richard Hinckley (1899). Star-names and Their Meanings. G.E. Stechert.
- Astronomical Applications Department (2011). Multiyear Computer Interactive Almanac. 2.2.2. Washington DC: US Naval Observatory. Longitude of Sun, apparent geocentric ecliptic of date, interpolated to find time of crossing 0°, 30°....
- Hall, Judy (2005). The Astrology Bible: The Definitive Guide to the Zodiac. New York: Sterling. ISBN 1402727593.
- Lewis, James R. (2003). The Astrology Book: The Encyclopedia of Heavenly Influences (2nd ed.). Detroit: Visible Ink Press. ISBN 1578591449.
- "Scorpio". dictionary.com. n.d.
- "Scorpius, constellation and astrological sign". Britannica.com. 2023.
- Tatum, Jeremy B. (June 2010). "The Signs and Constellations of the Zodiac". Journal of the Royal Society of Canada. 104 (3): 103–104. Bibcode:2010JRASC.104..103T.
