= Western astrology =

System of astrology used in the Western world

Western astrology is the system of astrology most popular in Western countries. It is historically based on Ptolemy's Tetrabiblos (2nd century CE), which in turn was a continuation of Hellenistic and ultimately Babylonian traditions.

Western astrology is largely horoscopic, that is, it is a form of divination based on the construction of a horoscope for an exact moment, such as a person's birth as well as the location (since time zones may or may not affect a person's birth chart), in which various cosmic bodies are said to have an influence. Astrology in western popular culture is often reduced to sun sign astrology, which considers only the individual's date of birth (i.e. the "position of the Sun" at that date).

Astrology is a pseudoscience and has consistently failed experimental and theoretical verification.

Astrology was widely considered a respectable academic and scientific field before the Enlightenment, but modern research has found no consistent empirical basis to it.

== Core principles ==
A central principle of astrology is integration within the cosmos. The individual, Earth, and its environment are viewed as a single organism, all parts of which are correlated with each other. (Note: "the entire universe is alive in mutual concord of its elements and is driven by the pulse of reason, since a single spirit dwells in all its parts and, speeding through all things, nourishes it like a living creature".) Cycles of change that are observed in the heavens are therefore reflective (not causative) of similar cycles of change observed on earth and within the individual. (Note: Al-Kindi (9th century) is clarifying this point where he says in his text On the Stellar Rays, ch.4: "... we say that one thing acts with its elemental rays on another, but according to the exquisite truth it does not act but only the celestial harmony acts".) This relationship is expressed in the Hermetic maxim "as above, so below; as below, so above", which postulates symmetry between the individual as a microcosm and the celestial environment as a macrocosm. (Note: "The doctrine of the Pythagoreans was a combination of science and mysticism... Like Anaximenes they viewed the Universe as one integrated, living organism, surrounded by Divine Air (or more literally 'Breath'), which permeates and animates the whole cosmos and filters through to individual creatures... By partaking of the core essence of the Universe, the individual is said to act as a microcosm in which all the laws in the macrocosm of the Universe are at work".)

As opposed to Sidereal astrology, Western astrology evaluates a person's birth based on the alignments of the stars and planets from the perspective on earth instead of in space.

At the heart of astrology is the metaphysical principle that mathematical relationships express qualities or 'tones' of energy which manifest in numbers, visual angles, shapes and sounds – all connected within a pattern of proportion. An early example is Ptolemy, who wrote influential texts on all these topics. Al-Kindi, in the 9th century, developed Ptolemy's ideas in De Aspectibus which explores many points of relevance to astrology and the use of planetary aspects.

== The zodiac ==
The zodiac is the belt or band of constellations through which the Sun, Moon, and planets move on their journey across the sky. Astrologers noted these constellations and so attached a particular significance to them. Over time they developed the system of twelve signs of the zodiac, based on twelve of the constellations through which the sun passes throughout the year, those constellations that are "Enlightened by the mind". Most western astrologers use the tropical zodiac beginning with the sign of Aries at the Northern Hemisphere vernal equinox always on or around March 21 of each year. The Western Zodiac is drawn based on the Earth's relationship to fixed, designated positions in the sky, and the Earth's seasons. The Sidereal Zodiac is drawn based on the Earth's position in relation to the constellations, and follows their movements in the sky.

Due to a phenomenon called precession of the equinoxes (where the Earth's axis slowly rotates like a spinning top in a 25,700-year cycle), there is a slow shift in the correspondence between Earth's seasons (and calendar) and the constellations of the zodiac. Thus, the tropical zodiac corresponds with the position of the earth in relation to fixed positions in the sky (Western Astrology), while the sidereal zodiac is drawn based on the position in relation to the constellations (sidereal zodiac).

=== The twelve signs ===
In modern Western astrology the signs of the zodiac are believed to represent twelve basic personality types or characteristic modes of expression. The twelve signs are divided into four elements fire, earth, air and water. Fire and air signs are considered masculine, while water and earth signs are considered feminine. The twelve signs are also divided into three qualities, also called modalities, Cardinal, fixed and mutable.

Western Astrology Table
Latin Name	Gloss	Symbol	Unicode Character	Approximate Sun Sign Dates	Ecliptic Longitude (a ≤ λ < b)	House	Polarity	Triplicity	Modality	Modern Ruler	Classic Ruler	Greek name	Sanskrit name	Sumero-Babylonian name
Aries	The Ram		♈︎	March 21 – April 19	0° to 30°	1	Positive	Fire	Cardinal	Mars		Κριός (Krios)	Meṣa (मेष)	^{MUL} LU.ḪUN.GA "Agrarian Worker", Dumuzi
Taurus	The Bull		♉︎	April 20 – May 20	30° to 60°	2	Negative	Earth	Fixed	Venus		Ταῦρος (Tauros)	Vṛṣabha (वृषभ)	^{MUL}GU_{4}.AN.NA "Divine Bull of Heaven"
Gemini	The Twins		♊︎	May 21 – June 20	60° to 90°	3	Positive	Air	Mutable	Mercury		Δίδυμοι (Didymoi)	Mithuna (मिथुन)	^{MUL}MAŠ.TAB.BA.GAL.GAL "Great Twins" (Castor & Pollux)
Cancer	The Crab		♋︎	June 21 – July 22	90° to 120°	4	Negative	Water	Cardinal	Moon		Καρκίνος (Karkinos)	Karka (कर्क)	^{MUL}AL.LUL "Crayfish"
Leo	The Lion		♌︎	July 23 – August 22	120° to 150°	5	Positive	Fire	Fixed	Sun		Λέων (Leōn)	Siṃha (सिंह)	^{MUL}UR.GU.LA "Lion"
Virgo	The Maiden		♍︎	August 23 – September 22	150° to 180°	6	Negative	Earth	Mutable	Mercury		Παρθένος (Parthenos)	Kanyā (कन्या)	^{MUL}AB.SIN "The Furrow"* *"The goddess Shala's ear of grain"
Libra	The Scales		♎︎	September 23 – October 22	180° to 210°	7	Positive	Air	Cardinal	Venus		Ζυγός (Zygos)	Tulā (तुला)	^{MUL}ZIB.BA.AN.NA "Scales"
Scorpio	The Scorpion		♏︎	October 23 – November 21	210° to 240°	8	Negative	Water	Fixed	Pluto	Mars	Σκoρπίος (Skorpios)	Vṛścika (वृश्चिक)	^{MUL}GIR.TAB "Scorpion"
Sagittarius	The Archer (Centaur)		♐︎	November 22 – December 21	240° to 270°	9	Positive	Fire	Mutable	Jupiter		Τοξότης (Toxotēs)	Dhanuṣa (धनुष)	^{MUL}PA.BIL.SAG, Nedu "soldier"
Capricorn	The Goat		♑︎	December 22 – January 19	270° to 300°	10	Negative	Earth	Cardinal	Saturn		Αἰγόκερως (Aigokerōs)	Makara (मकर)	^{MUL}SUḪUR.MAŠ "Goat-Fish" of Enki
Aquarius	The Water-bearer		♒︎	January 20 – February 18	300° to 330°	11	Positive	Air	Fixed	Uranus	Saturn	Ὑδροχόος (Hydrokhoos)	Kumbha (कुंभ)	^{MUL}GU.LA "Great One", later qâ "pitcher"
Pisces	The Fish		♓︎	February 19 – March 20	330° to 360°	12	Negative	Water	Mutable	Neptune	Jupiter	Ἰχθύες (Ikhthyes)	Mīna (मीन)	^{MUL}SIM.MAḪ "Tail of the Swallow"; DU.NU.NU "fish-cord"

- Note: these are only approximations and the exact date on which the sign of the sun changes varies from year to year.

=== Sun-sign astrology ===
Newspapers often print astrology columns which purport to provide guidance on what might occur in a day in relation to the sign of the zodiac that included the sun when the person was born. Astrologers refer to this as the "sun sign", but it is often commonly called the "star sign". These predictions are vague or general; so much so that even practicing astrologers consider them of little to no value on their own. Experiments have shown that when people are shown a newspaper horoscope for their own sign along with a newspaper horoscope for a different sign, they judge them to be equally accurate on average. Other tests have been performed on complete, personalized horoscopes cast by professional astrologers, and have shown no correlation between the horoscope results and the person it was cast for.

== The planets ==
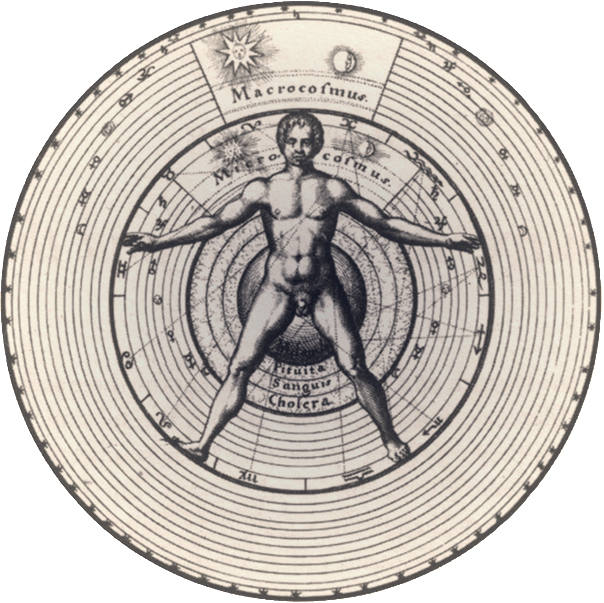
Robert Fludd's 16th-century illustration of man the microcosm within the universal macrocosm

In modern Western astrology the planets represent basic drives or impulses in the human psyche. These planets differ from the definition of a planet in astronomy in that the Sun, Moon, and recently, Pluto are all considered to be planets for the purposes of astrology. Each planet is also said to be the ruler of one or two zodiac signs. The three outer planets (Uranus, Neptune, Pluto) have each been assigned rulership of a zodiac sign by astrologers. Traditionally rulership of the signs was, according to Ptolemy, based on seasonal derivations and astronomical measurement, whereby the luminaries being the brightest planets were given rulership of the brightest months of the year and Saturn the coldest furthest classical planet was given to the coldest months of the year, with the other planets ruling the remaining signs as per astronomical measurement. It is noteworthy that the modern rulerships do not follow the same logic.

=== Classical planets ===
The astrological 'planets' are the seven heavenly bodies known to the ancients. The Sun and Moon, also known as 'the lights', are included as they were thought to act like the astronomical planets. Astrologers call inner planets Mercury, Venus and Mars, the 'personal planets', as they represent the most immediate drives. The 'lights' symbolise respectively the existential and sensitive fundamentals of the individuality.

The following table summarizes the rulership by the seven classically known planets of each of the twelve astrological signs, together with their effects on world events, people and the earth itself as understood in the Middle Ages.

Traditional planets with their rulership of signs and effects on people and the world
Symbol	Planet	Rules the sign	Effect on world events	Person's nature	Effect in life	Effect in earth
	Sun	Leo		Wisdom, generosity, 'sunny' disposition	Good fortune	Gold
	Moon	Cancer		Wandering	Travel, lunacy	Silver
	Mercury	Gemini and Virgo	Action	Changeability, eagerness, quickness, 'mercurial' temperament	Rapid change	Mercury (quicksilver)
	Venus	Libra and Taurus	Fortunate events	Beauty, amorousness	Good luck	Copper (Note: Lewis notes that Venus was associated with the island of Cyprus, the classical source of copper.)
	Mars	Aries, classically also Scorpio	War	Strength, endurance, 'martial' temperament	Conflicts, misfortune	Iron
	Jupiter	Sagittarius, classically also Pisces	Good times, prosperity	Cheerful, magnanimous, 'jovial' temperament	Good fortune	Tin
	Saturn	Capricorn, classically also Aquarius	Disastrous events	Wisdom, stability, persistence, 'saturnine' temperament	Accidents, disease, treachery, bad luck	Lead

== Modern modifications to the Ptolemaic system ==
=== Additional planets ===
These are the planets discovered in modern times, which have since been assigned meanings by Western astrologers.

Planets discovered in modern times, with signs and effects
Symbol	Planet	Representing	Rules the sign	Claimed effects on world events	Claimed effects on people
	Uranus	(a) Platinum as a planetary metal; (b) monogram 'H' for planet's discoverer, William Herschel	Aquarius	Innovation, technology	Sudden or disruptive change
	Neptune	Trident, weapon of sea-god Neptune	Pisces	Change of contemporary musical taste	Confusion, sensitivity
	Pluto	(a) Pluto's bident; (b) PL monogram for astronomer Percival Lowell who predicted a planet beyond Neptune	Scorpio	Demolition of old, bad political systems	Transformation, fate, death

=== Sidereal and tropical astrology ===
There are two camps of thought among western astrologers about the "starting point", 0 degrees Aries, in the zodiac. Sidereal astrology uses a fixed starting point in the background of stars, while tropical astrology, used by the majority of Western astrologers, chooses as a starting point the position of the Sun against the background of stars at the Northern hemisphere vernal equinox (i.e. when the Sun position against the heavens crosses over from the southern hemisphere to the northern hemisphere) each year. The consequence of the Tropical approach is that when we say the Sun or a planet is in a certain zodiac sign, observation of it in the sky will show that it does not lie within that constellation at all.

As the Earth spins on its axis, it "wobbles" like a top, causing the vernal equinox to move gradually backwards against the star background, (a phenomenon known as the Precession of the equinoxes) at a rate of about 30 degrees (one Zodiacal sign length) every 2,160 years. Thus the two zodiacs would be aligned only once every 26,000 years. They were aligned about 2,000 years ago when the zodiac was originally established.

This phenomenon gives us the conceptual basis for the Age of Aquarius, whose "dawning" coincides with the movement of the vernal equinox across the cusp from Pisces to Aquarius in the star background.

=== The moon's nodes ===
Also important in astrology are the moon's nodes. The nodes are where the moon's path crosses the ecliptic. The North, or Ascending Node marks the place where the moon crosses from South to North (or ascends), while the South, or Descending Node marks where the moon crosses from North to South (or descends). While Lunar nodes are not considered by Western astrologers to be as important a factor as each of the planets, they are thought to mark sensitive areas that are worth taking into account.

- – North or ascending Node. Also the ruler of Pathways and Choices.
- – South or descending Node. Also the ruler of Karma and the Past.

=== Essential dignity ===
In astrology, "essential dignity" is the strength of a planet or point's zodiac position, judged only by its position by sign and degree, what the pre-eminent 17th-century astrologer William Lilly called "the strength, fortitude or debility of the Planets [or] significators." In other words, essential dignity seeks to view the strengths of a planet or point as though it were isolated from other factors in the sky of the natal chart. Traditionally, there are five dignities: domicile and detriment, exaltation and fall, triplicity, terms, and face. However, the later two have diminished in usage. A planet's domicile is the zodiac sign over which it has rulership.

== The horoscope ==
Western astrology is based mainly upon the construction of a horoscope, which is a map or chart of the heavens at a particular moment. The moment chosen is the beginning of the existence of the subject of the horoscope, as it is believed that the subject will carry with it the pattern of the heavens from that moment throughout its life. The most common form of horoscope is the natal chart based on the moment of a person's birth; though in theory a horoscope can be drawn up for the beginning of anything, from a business enterprise to the foundation of a nation state.

The Thema Mundi

=== Interpretation ===
In Western horoscopic astrology the interpretation of a horoscope is governed by:

- The position of the planets in the astrological signs of the zodiac,
- The position of the planets in the houses of the horoscope,
- The position of the primary angles of the horoscope, namely the horizon line (called the ascendant/descendant axis), and the prime vertical line (called the zenith/midheaven and nadir/imum coeli axis),
- The angles formed by the planets relative to each other and the primary angles, called aspects
- The position of deduced astronomical entities, such as the Lunar nodes.

Some astrologers also use the position of various mathematical points, such as the Arabic parts.

Various techniques are used, with different degrees of complexity, to provide what astrologers claim are forecasts or predictive statements about the future, as well as to analyse past and current events. These include transits, progressions, and primary directions. Different branches of astrology, such as horary and electional astrology, have their own specific sets of techniques.

=== The primary angles ===
There are four primary angles in the horoscope (though the cusps of the houses are often included as important angles by some astrologers).

- A^{sc} - The ascendant or rising sign is the eastern point where the ecliptic and horizon intersect. During the course of a day, because of the Earth's rotation, the entire circle of the ecliptic will pass through the ascendant and will be advanced by about 1°. This provides us with the term rising sign, which is the sign of the zodiac that was rising in the east at the exact time that the horoscope or natal chart is calculated. In creating a horoscope the ascendant is traditionally placed as the left-hand side point of the chart. In most house systems the ascendant lies on the cusp of the 1st house of the horoscope.

The ascendant is generally considered the most important and personalized angle in the horoscope by the vast majority of astrologers. It signifies a person's awakening consciousness, in the same way that the Sun's appearance on the eastern horizon signifies the dawn of a new day. Due to the fact that the ascendant is specific to a particular time and place, it signifies the individual environment and conditioning that a person receives during their upbringing, and also the circumstances of their childhood. For this reason, the ascendant is also concerned with how a person has learned to present themself to the world, especially in public and in impersonal situations.

The opposite point to the ascendant in the west is the descendant, which denotes how a person reacts in their relationships with others. It also show the kind of person we are likely to be attracted to, and our ability to form romantic attachments. In most house systems the descendant lies on the cusp of the 7th house of the horoscope.

- M^{c} - The midheaven or medium coeli is the point on the ecliptic that is furthest above the plane of the horizon. For events occurring where the planes of the ecliptic and the horizon coincide, the limiting position for these points is located 90° from the ascendant. For astrologers, the midheaven traditionally indicates a person's career, status, aim in life, aspirations, public reputation, and life goal. In quadrant house systems the midheaven lies on the cusp of the 10th house of the horoscope.

The opposite point to the midheaven is known as the imum coeli. For astrologers the nadir or IC traditionally indicates the circumstances at the beginning and end of a person's life, their parents and the parental home, and their own domestic life. In quadrant house systems it lies on the cusp of the 4th house of the horoscope.

=== The houses ===
The horoscope is divided by astrologers into 12 portions called the houses. The houses of the horoscope are interpreted as being 12 different spheres of life or activity. There are various ways of calculating the houses in the horoscope or birth chart.

Many modern astrologers assume that the houses relate to their corresponding signs, i.e. that the first house has a natural affinity with the first sign, Aries, and so on.

=== Aspects ===
The aspects are the angles the planets make to each other in the horoscope, and also to the ascendant, midheaven, descendant and nadir. The aspects are measured by the angular distance along the ecliptic in degrees and minutes of celestial longitude between two points, as viewed from the earth. They indicate focal points in the horoscope where the energies involved are given extra emphasis. The more exact the angle, the more powerful the aspect, although an allowance of a few degrees each side of the aspect called an orb is allowed for interpretation. The following are the aspects in order of importance:

- - Conjunction 0° (orb ±10°). The conjunction is a major point in the chart, giving strong emphasis to the planets involved. The planets will act together to outside stimulus and act on each other.
- - Opposition 180° (orb ±10°). The opposition is indicative of tension, conflict and confrontation, due to the polarity between the two elements involved. Stress arises when one is used over the other, causing an imbalance; but the opposition can work well if the two parts of the aspect are made to complement each other in a synthesis.
- - Trine 120°(orb ±7.5°). The trine indicates harmony, and ease of expression, with the two elements reinforcing each other. The trine is a source of artistic and creative talent, but can be a 'line of least resistance' to a person of weak character.
- - Square 90°(orb ±7.5°). The square indicates frustration, inhibitions, disruption and inner conflict, but can become a source of energy and activation to a person determined to overcome limitations.
- - Sextile 60°(orb ±5°). The sextile is similar to the trine, but of less significance. It indicates ease of communication between the two elements involved, with compatibility and harmony between them.
- - Quincunx 150°(orb ±2.5°). The quincunx indicates difficulty and stress, due to incompatible elements being forced together. It can mean an area of self-neglect in a person's life (especially health), or obligations being forced on a person. The quincunx can vary from minor to quite major in impact.
- - Semisextile 30° (orb ±1.25°). Slight in effect. Indicates an area of life where a conscious effort to be positive will have to be made.
- - Semisquare 45°(orb ±2.5°). Indicates somewhat difficult circumstance. Similar in effect to semisextile.
- - Sesquiquadrate 135°(orb ±2.5°). Indicates somewhat stressful conditions. Similar to semisextile.
- Q - Quintile 72° (orb ±1.25°). Slight in effect. Indicates talent and vaguely fortunate circumstances.
- bQ - Biquintile 144° (orb ±1.25°). Slight in effect. Indicates talent and vaguely fortunate circumstances.
- ℞ - Retrograde: A planet is retrograde when it appears to move backwards across the sky when seen from the earth. Although it is not an aspect, some astrologers believe that it should be included for consideration in the chart. Planets which are retrograde in the natal chart are considered by them to be potential weak points.

== Astrology and science ==
The majority of professional astrologers rely on performing astrology-based personality tests and making relevant predictions about the remunerator's future. Those who continue to have faith in astrology have been characterised as doing so "in spite of the fact that there is no verified scientific basis for their beliefs, and indeed that there is strong evidence to the contrary".

Astrology has not demonstrated its effectiveness in controlled studies and has no scientific validity, and as such, is regarded as pseudoscience. (Note: "To optimise the chances of finding even remote relationships between date of birth and individual differences in personality and intelligence we further applied two different strategies. The first one was based on the common chronological concept of time (e.g. month of birth and season of birth). The second strategy was based on the (pseudo-scientific) concept of astrology (e.g. Sun Signs, The Elements, and astrological gender), as discussed in the book Astrology: Science or superstition? by Eysenck and Nias (1982).") There is no proposed mechanism of action by which the positions and motions of stars and planets could affect people and events on Earth that does not contradict well understood, basic aspects of biology and physics. (Note: "About three-fourths of Americans hold at least one pseudoscientific belief; i.e., they believed in at least 1 of the 10 survey items[29]" ... "Those 10 items were extrasensory perception (ESP), that houses can be haunted, ghosts/that spirits of dead people can come back in certain places/situations, telepathy/communication between minds without using traditional senses, clairvoyance/the power of the mind to know the past and predict the future, astrology/that the position of the stars and planets can affect people's lives, that people can communicate mentally with someone who has died, witches, reincarnation/the rebirth of the soul in a new body after death, and channeling/allowing a "spirit-being" to temporarily assume control of a body".)

Where astrology has made falsifiable predictions, it has been falsified. A notable test headed by physicist Shawn Carlson included a committee of scientists and a committee of astrologers, with the results published in Nature. It led to the conclusion that natal astrology performed no better than chance.

== See also ==
- Zodiac
- Astrological symbols
- Astrological signs
- List of asteroids in astrology
- Chinese zodiac
- Circle of stars
- Cusp (astrology)
- Elements of the zodiac
- Natal astrology
- Synoptical astrology
- Tarotscope
