= House (astrology) =

Division of the horoscope into 12 sectors

Most horoscopic traditions of astrology systems divide the horoscope into a number (usually twelve) of houses whose positions depend on time and location rather than on date. The houses of the horoscope represent different fields of experience wherein the energies of the signs and planets operate—described in terms of physical surroundings as well as personal life experiences.

== Background ==
In this natal chart, the twelve houses are numbered close to the central circle containing the colored aspect lines; this particular horoscope uses the Placidus house system.

In astrology, houses are a fundamental component of the birth chart that represent different areas of life. There are 12 houses, each associated with a specific zodiac sign and planetary ruler. The 12 houses in Western astrology represent distinct areas of life experience, shaping how planetary energies manifest in an individual's natal chart. Each house reflects a unique aspect of existence, from personal identity to relationships, career, and spirituality. The interpretation of the houses can vary based on different astrological traditions, psychological frameworks, and philosophical approaches. In Vedic astrology, these 12 houses are traditionally called 'bhavas' and are used to examine different areas of life in a kundli. The lagna, or Ascendant serves as an important references point for arranging the houses.

The houses are divisions of the ecliptic plane (a great circle containing the Sun's orbit, as seen from the earth), at the time and place of the horoscope in question. They are numbered counter-clockwise from the cusp of the first house. Commonly, houses one through six are below the horizon and houses seven through twelve are above the horizon, but some systems may not respect entirely that division (in particular when the Ascendant does not coincide with the first house's cusp).

Every house system is dependent on the rotational movement of Earth on its axis, but there is a wide range of approaches to calculating house divisions and different opinions among astrologers over which house system is most accurate. To calculate the houses, it is necessary to know the exact time, date, and location. The several methods of calculating house divisions stem from disagreement over what they mean mathematically (regarding space and time). All house systems in Western astrology use twelve houses projected on the ecliptic. The differences arise from which fundamental plane is the object of the initial division and whether the divisions represent units of time, or degrees of distance.

If space is the basis for house division, the chosen plane is divided into equal arcs of 30° each. A difference will be made as to whether these divisions are made directly on the ecliptic, or on the celestial equator or some other great circle, before being projected on the ecliptic.

If time is the basis for house division, a difference must be made for whether the houses are based on invariant equal hours (each house represents 2 hours of the sun's apparent movement each day) or temporal hours (daytime and night-time divided into six equal parts, but here the temporal hours will vary according to season and latitude).

Regardless of these different methods, all house divisions in Western astrology share certain things in common: the twelve house cusps are always projected on the ecliptic, they all place the cusp of the first house near the eastern horizon, and every house cusp is 180° of longitude apart from the sixth following house (1st opposes 7th; 2nd opposes 8th and so on).

== Qualities ==
House	Related Sign	Latin motto	Translation	Modern title
1st	Aries	Vita	Life	House of Self
2nd	Taurus	Lucrum	Gain	House of Possessions
3rd	Gemini	Fratres	Brothers	House of Communication
4th	Cancer	Genitor	Parent	House of Nurturing
5th	Leo	Nati	Children	House of Expression
6th	Virgo	Valetudo	Health	House of Responsibility
7th	Libra	Uxor	Spouse	House of Connections
8th	Scorpio	Mors	Death	House of Catharsis
9th	Sagittarius	Iter	Journey	House of Exploration
10th	Capricorn	Regnum	Kingdom	House of Achievements
11th	Aquarius	Benefacta	Support	House of Community
12th	Pisces	Carcer	Rehabilitation	House of Reflection

The table to the right represents the basic outline of the houses as they are still understood today and includes the traditional Latin names. The houses are numbered from the east downward under the horizon, each representing a specific area of life. Many modern astrologers assume that the houses relate to their corresponding signs, i.e. that the first house has a natural affinity with the first sign, Aries, and so on.

=== First House (House of Self) ===
Aries {Vita || Life} - The First House governs self-identity, physical appearance, and the persona—the outward expression of one's inner world. Liz Greene views this house as representing the mask we wear to navigate external life while concealing deeper psychological realities. Deborah Houlding emphasizes its traditional role as the foundation of vitality and character, where the ascendant sign influences temperament and health. Dane Rudhyar describes it as the emergence of consciousness, symbolizing the individual's first interaction with the external world. Stephen Arroyo sees it as the lens through which we approach life's challenges, reflecting our initial reactions and self-image.

=== Second House (House of Value) ===
Taurus {Lucrum || Gain} - The Second House relates to personal resources, material possessions, and self-worth. Greene highlights how this house reflects the internalized value system that shapes not just finances but emotional security. Houlding explains its traditional association with wealth and livelihood, focusing on how possessions contribute to stability. Rudhyar interprets the Second House as the process of building personal foundations, emphasizing the individual's relationship with the material world. Arroyo simplifies it as the house of self-sufficiency, showing how one's attitude toward money and possessions reflects broader psychological patterns.

=== Third House (House of Sharing) ===
Gemini {Fratres || Brothers} - The Third House governs communication, learning, and relationships with immediate surroundings. Greene emphasizes the development of cognitive skills and how early interactions shape mental patterns. Houlding focuses on its traditional role in local travel, siblings, and the sharing of ideas within communities. Rudhyar views this house as the emergence of the thinking mind, reflecting curiosity and the desire to connect through knowledge. Arroyo describes it as the house of everyday learning and practical communication, governing both casual conversations and intellectual exploration.

=== Fourth House (House of Home and Family) ===
Cancer {Genitor || Parent} - The Fourth House represents home, family, and the emotional roots that provide stability. Greene sees this house as the foundation of the inner self, where unconscious family patterns and childhood experiences shape adult life. Houlding highlights its traditional role as the house of ancestry and heritage, reflecting physical property and familial lineage. Rudhyar interprets it as the inner sanctuary where personal identity is nurtured away from the public eye. Arroyo focuses on the emotional security found in home life and how family relationships influence psychological well-being.

=== Fifth House (House of Pleasure) ===
Leo {Nati || Children} - The Fifth House governs creativity, romance, and self-expression. Greene views this house as the arena for authentic expression, where individuals explore their unique identity through love, art, and play. Houlding emphasizes its traditional association with children, entertainment, and gambling, focusing on risk and pleasure. Rudhyar describes it as the creative impulse that drives individuals to leave a personal mark on the world. Arroyo interprets it as the house of personal fulfillment, where joy, passion, and artistic pursuits thrive.

=== Sixth House (House of Health and Service) ===
Virgo {Valetudo || Health} - The Sixth House relates to health, daily routines, and service to others. Greene highlights this house as the space where individuals balance personal needs with responsibility, integrating work and health into a cohesive routine. Houlding notes its traditional role in governing illness, servitude, and labor, focusing on the obligations that structure daily life. Rudhyar interprets it as the process of self-improvement through discipline and attention to detail. Arroyo views it as the house of practicality, emphasizing wellness, work habits, and self-care.

=== Seventh House (House of Balance) ===
Libra {Uxor || Spouse} - The Seventh House governs relationships, including marriage, business partnerships, and legal contracts. Greene describes it as the mirror of the self, reflecting the qualities we seek—and often project—onto others in close relationships. Houlding emphasizes its traditional role in governing alliances and open enemies, highlighting the balance between cooperation and conflict. Rudhyar sees it as the point where personal identity meets the "Other," symbolizing the evolution of self through meaningful connections. Arroyo interprets it as the house of committed partnerships, emphasizing harmony, negotiation, and balance.

=== Eighth House (House of Transformation) ===
Scorpio {Mors || Death} - The Eighth House is associated with transformation, shared resources, and intimacy. Greene delves into its role in deep psychological transformation, where themes of power, control, and emotional vulnerability surface. Houlding connects it to traditional topics like inheritance, death, and joint finances, emphasizing the merging of resources and identities. Rudhyar interprets it as the house of regeneration, where crisis and rebirth lead to profound growth. Arroyo sees it as a space for emotional depth and intimacy, focusing on the transformative power of close bonds.

=== Ninth House (House of Purpose) ===
Sagittarius {Iter || Journey} - The Ninth House represents higher education, philosophy, and long-distance travel. Greene highlights the house as the realm of the search for meaning, where individuals explore spirituality, culture, and belief systems. Houlding focuses on its traditional role in religion, law, and foreign affairs, emphasizing the expansion of one's worldview. Rudhyar views it as the stage of intellectual and spiritual exploration, where personal experience broadens into universal understanding. Arroyo interprets it as the house of personal growth through exploration, whether intellectual or physical.

=== Tenth House (House of Enterprise) ===
Capricorn {Regnum || Kingdom} - The Tenth House governs career, public reputation, and social status. Greene interprets it as the house of external achievement, where societal roles and ambitions are pursued to fulfill personal destiny. Houlding highlights its traditional role in representing authority figures and social standing, often linked to one's professional path. Rudhyar sees it as the culmination of personal development expressed in the public sphere, representing the manifestation of one's life purpose. Arroyo focuses on career aspirations and the drive for success and recognition in the wider world.

=== Eleventh House (House of Blessings) ===
Aquarius {Benefacta || Support} - The Eleventh House governs friendships, social networks, and community involvement. Greene describes it as the sphere where individuals pursue collective ideals and engage in group dynamics to realize shared visions. Houlding connects it to traditional associations with hopes, wishes, and alliances, highlighting the importance of social connection. Rudhyar interprets it as the house of future-oriented aspirations and participation in collective movements. Arroyo views it as the space where collaboration and innovation flourish, emphasizing the role of community in personal development.

=== Twelfth House (House of Sacrifice) ===
Pisces {Carcer || Rehabilitation} - The Twelfth House represents the subconscious, spirituality, and hidden aspects of life. Greene emphasizes its role in psychological integration, where unconscious fears and desires are confronted through solitude and introspection. Houlding highlights its traditional association with isolation, secrecy, and institutions like hospitals and monasteries. Rudhyar sees it as the space of transcendence and dissolution, where the ego dissolves into the greater whole. Arroyo interprets it as the house of spiritual growth and introspection, focusing on inner healing and connection to the collective unconscious.

== House modalities and triplicities ==
Similarly to how signs are classified according to astrological modality (Cardinal, Fixed and Mutable), houses are classified as Angular, Succedent and Cadent.

Modality	Keyword	Houses
Angular	Action	1st, 4th, 7th and 10th
Succedent	Security	2nd, 5th, 8th and 11th
Cadent	Learning	3rd, 6th, 9th and 12th

Angular houses are points of initiation and represent action; they relate to cardinal signs (Aries, Cancer, Libra and Capricorn). Succedent houses are points of purpose and represent stabilization; they relate to fixed signs (Taurus, Leo, Scorpio and Aquarius). Cadent houses are points of transition and represent change and adaptation; they relate to mutable signs (Gemini, Virgo, Sagittarius and Pisces).

Following the classification of signs by the four classical elements (Fire, Earth, Air and Water), houses can also be grouped together in triplicities, related to a level of experience.

Triplicity	Keyword	Houses
Fire Triplicity	Identity	1st, 5th and 9th
Earth Triplicity	Material	2nd, 6th and 10th
Air Triplicity	Social, Intellectual	3rd, 7th and 11th
Water Triplicity	Soul, Emotional	4th, 8th and 12th

In old astrological writings (e.g. William Lilly), house could also be used as a synonym for domicile or rulership, as in the sentence "The Moon has its house in Cancer" meaning that Cancer is ruled by the Moon. It may be helpful to think of a ruling planet, in this case the Moon, as the "owner of the 4th House", and the sign, e.g. Cancer, as the CEO or landlord who runs the house. In an individual horoscope, whatever planet occupies any given house can be thought of as the house's tenant. (See Rulership section below.)

== Systems of house division ==
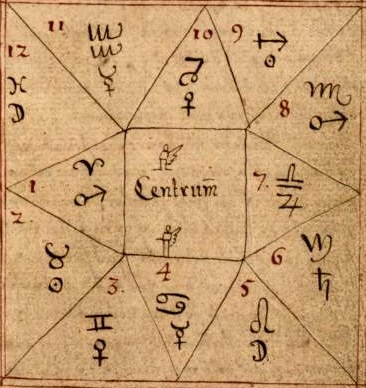
This 18th-century Icelandic manuscript drawing shows the twelve astrological houses with signs for the planetary rulership or maybe planetary joy.

There are many systems of house division. In most, the ecliptic is divided into houses and the ascendant (eastern horizon) marks the cusp, or beginning, of the first house, and the descendant (western horizon) marks the cusp of the seventh house. Many systems, called quadrant house systems, also use the midheaven (medium coeli) as the cusp of the tenth house.

Goals for a house system include ease of computation; agreement with the "quadrant" concept (ascendant on the first house cusp and midheaven on the tenth); defined and meaningful behaviour in the polar regions; acceptable handling of heavenly bodies of high latitude (a distinct problem from high-latitude locations on the Earth's surface); and symbolic value. It is impossible for any system to satisfy all the criteria completely, so each one represents a different compromise. The extremely popular Placidus and Koch systems, in particular, can generate undefined results in the polar circles. Research and debate on the merits of different house systems is ongoing.

=== Early forms of house division ===
The Babylonians may have been the first to set out the concept of house division. Specifically, they timed the birth according to three systems of time division: (a) a three-part division of the night into watches, (b) a four-part division of the nychthemeron with respect to sunrise and sunset, and (c) a twelve-part division of the day-time into hours. Babylonian astronomers studied the rising times of the signs and calculated tables of ascensions for their latitude, but it would take better time measurements by the Egyptians and the introduction of the concept of ascendant, around the 2nd century BC, to give astrological houses their first recognisable structure and meaning, from the perspective of Classical Western astrology.

==== Whole sign ====
In the whole sign house system, sometimes referred to as the 'Sign-House system', the houses are 30° each. The ascendant designates the rising sign, and the first house begins at zero degrees of the zodiac sign in which the ascendant falls, regardless of how early or late in that sign the ascendant is. The next sign after the ascending sign then becomes the 2nd house, the sign after that the 3rd house, and so on. In other words, each house is wholly filled by one sign. This was the main system used in the Hellenistic tradition of astrology, and is also used in Indian astrology, as well as in some early traditions of Medieval astrology. It is thought to be the oldest system of house division.

The Whole Sign system may have been developed in the Hellenistic tradition of astrology sometime around the 1st or 2nd century BCE, and from there it may have passed to the Indian and early Medieval traditions of astrology; though the line of thought which states that it was transmitted to India from Western locales is hotly contested. At some point in the Medieval period, probably around the 10th century, whole sign houses fell into disuse in the western tradition, and by the 20th century the system was completely unknown in the western astrological community, although was continually used in India all the way into the present time. Beginning in the 1980s and 1990s the system was rediscovered and reintroduced into western astrology.

The distinction between equal houses and whole sign houses lies in the fact that in whole sign houses the cusp of the 1st house is the beginning of the sign that contains the ascendant, while in equal houses the degree of the ascendant is itself the cusp of the 1st house.

==== Equal house ====
In the equal house system the ecliptic is also divided into twelve divisions of 30 degrees, although the houses are measured out in 30 degree increments starting from the degree of the ascendant. It begins with the ascendant, which acts as the 'cusp' or starting point of the 1st house, then the second house begins exactly 30 degrees later in zodiacal order, then the third house begins exactly 30 degrees later in zodiacal order from the 2nd house, and so on. Proponents of the equal house system claim that it is more accurate and less distorting in higher latitudes (especially above 60 degrees) than the Placidean and other quadrant house systems.

=== Space-based house systems ===
In this type of system, the definition of houses involves the division of the sphere into twelve equal lunes perpendicular to a fundamental plane (the Morinus and Regiomontanus systems being two notable exceptions).

Spatial house system	Fundamental Plane	Division	Reference point(s)	Projection onto the ecliptic	1st cusp	10th cusp
Whole sign	Ecliptic	12 equal sectors of 30° in longitude	Rising Sign	-	0° of rising sign	0° of Nonagesimal sign
Equal house	Ecliptic	12 equal sectors of 30° in longitude	Longitude of Asc (λ_{Asc})	-	λ_{Asc}	Nonagesimal (λ_{Asc} - 90º)
M-House	Ecliptic	12 equal sectors of 30° in longitude	Longitude of MC (λ_{MC})	-	λ_{MC} + 90º	λ_{MC}
Porphyry	Ecliptic	Trisection of MC-Asc longitude arc (11th, 12th cusps); Trisection of Asc-IC longitude arc (2nd, 3rd cusps)	Longitudes of MC, Asc and IC	-	λ_{Asc}	λ_{MC}
Carter's Poli Equatorial	Celestial equator	12 equal sectors of 30° in RA (2 sidereal hours)	RA of Asc	Along great circles containing the celestial poles	λ_{Asc}	Not the MC
Meridian	Celestial equator	12 equal sectors of 30° in RA (2 sidereal hours)	RA of MC	Along great circles containing the celestial poles	East Point (Equatorial Ascendant)	λ_{MC}
Morinus	Celestial equator	12 equal sectors of 30° in RA (2 sidereal hours)	RA of MC	Along great circles containing the ecliptic poles	λ_{MC} + 90º	Not the MC
Regiomontanus	Celestial equator	12 equal sectors of 30° in RA (2 sidereal hours)	RA of MC	Along great circles containing the North and south points of the Horizon	λ_{Asc}	λ_{MC}
Campanus	Prime vertical	12 equal sectors of 30°	Zenith	Along great circles containing the North and south points of the Horizon	λ_{Asc}	λ_{MC}

==== M-House (Equal Mc) ====
This system is constructed in a similar manner as the Equal house, but houses are measured out in 30 degree increments starting from the longitude of the midheaven (Mc), which acts as the 'cusp' or starting point of the 10th house. The ascendant does not coincide with the cusp for the 1st house.

==== Porphyry ====
Each quadrant of the ecliptic is divided into three equal parts between the four angles. This is the oldest system of quadrant style house division. Although it is attributed to Porphyry of Tyros, this system was first described by the 2nd-century astrologer Vettius Valens, in the 3rd book of his astrological compendium known as The Anthology. Martin Gansten argues that in Valens, houses were often provisionally approximated by sign position alone, but calculation of places by degree was consistently upheld in principle as more accurate and useful.

==== Carter's Poli Equatorial ====
This house system was described by the English astrologer Charles E. O. Carter (1887–1968) in his Essays on the Foundations of Astrology. The house division starts at the right ascension of the ascendant and to it is added 30º of right ascension for each successive cusp. Those cusps are then restated in terms of celestial longitude by projecting them along great circles containing the North and South celestial poles. The 1st house cusp coincides with the ascendant's longitude, but the 10th house cusp is not identical with the Midheaven.

==== Meridian ====
Also known as the Axial system, or Equatorial system, it divides the celestial equator in twelve 30° sectors (starting at the local meridian) and projects them on to the ecliptic along the great circles containing the North and South celestial poles. The intersections of the ecliptic with those great circles provide the house cusps. The 10th house cusp thus equals the Midheaven, but the East Point (also known as Equatorial Ascendant) is now the first house's cusp. Each house is exactly 2 sidereal hours long. This system was proposed by the Australian astrologer David Cope in the beginning of the 20th century and has become the most popular system with the Uranian school of astrology. The Ascendant (intersection between the ecliptic and the horizon) preserves its importance in chart interpretation through sign and aspects, but not as a house determinant, which is why this house system can be used in any latitude.

==== Regiomontanus ====
The celestial equator is divided into twelve, and these divisions are projected on to the ecliptic along great circles that take in the north and south points on the horizon. Named after the German astronomer and astrologer Johann Müller of Königsberg, the Regiomontanus system was later largely replaced by the Placidus system.

==== Campanus ====
The prime vertical (the great circle taking in the zenith and east point on the horizon) is divided into twelve, and these divisions are projected on to the ecliptic along great circles that take in the north and south points on the horizon. It is attributed to Campanus of Novara but the method is known to have been used before his time.

==== Sinusoidal ====
Sinusoidal systems of house division are similar to Porphyry houses except that instead of each quadrant being divided into three equal sized houses, the middle house in each quadrant is compressed or expanded based on whether the quadrant covers less than or greater than 90 degrees. In other words, houses are smooth around the zodiac with the difference or ratio in quadrant sizes being spread in a continuous sinusoidal manner from expanded to compressed houses. Sinusoidal houses were invented and first published by Walter Pullen in his astrology program Astrolog in 1994.

=== Time-based house systems ===
==== Alchabitius ====
The predecessor system to the Placidus, which largely replaced the Porphyry. The difference with Placidus is that the time that it takes the ascendant to reach the meridian is divided equally into three parts. The Alchabitius house system was very popular in Europe before the introduction of the Regiomontanus system.

==== Placidus ====
This is the most commonly used house system in modern Western astrology. The paths drawn for each degree of the ecliptic to move from the Imum coeli to the horizon, and from the horizon to the midheaven, are trisected to determine the cusps of houses 2, 3, 11, and 12. The cusps of houses 8, 9, 5 and 6 are opposite these. The Placidus system is sometimes not defined beyond polar circles (latitudes greater than 66°N or 66°S), because certain degrees are circumpolar (never touch the horizon), and planets falling in them cannot be assigned to houses without extending the system. This result is a weakness of the Placidean system according to its critics, who often cite the exceptional house proportions in the higher latitudes.

Named for 17th-century astrologer Placidus de Titis, it is thought the Placidus system was first mentioned about 13th century in Arab literature, but the first confirmed publication was in 1602 by Giovanni Antonio Magini (1555–1617) in his book "Tabulae Primi Mobilis, quas Directionem Vulgo Dicunt". The first documented usage is from Czech, 1627.

==== Koch ====
A rather more complicated version of the Placidus system, built on equal increments of Right Ascension for each quadrant. The Koch system was developed by the German astrologer Walter Koch (1895–1970) and is defined only for latitudes between 66°N and 66°S. This system is popular among research astrologers in the U.S. and among German speakers, but in Central Europe lost some popularity to the Krusiński house system.

==== Topocentric ====
This is a recent system, invented in Argentina, that its creators claim has been determined empirically, i.e. by observing events in people's lives and assessing the geometry of a house system that would fit. The house cusps are always within a degree of those given in the Placidus system. The topocentric system can also be described as an approximation algorithm for the Placidus system. Topocentric houses are also called Polich-Page, after the names of the house system creators, Wendel Polich and A. Page Nelson.

==== Topocentric Equal Time True Ascension ====
In this system, the 1st house begins at the ascendant. The cusp of the 2nd house is determined to be the ascendant 2 hours later, with all 12 houses completing 24 hours. The midheaven, descendant, and bottom of the sky are not directly used to mark any house. Houses mark the ascendant with an equal time in each. The speed of the ascendant around the zodiac varies significantly with latitude. The midheaven moves at a near constant speed of 30 degrees per 2 hours regardless of latitude with only a small variation from the inclination of the ecliptic. From knowing the midheaven, the local sidereal time can be determined based on the inclination of the ecliptic. From the local sidereal time, the ascendant, and ascendants in the future which mark house cusps, can be determined. The ascendant differs from the east point depending on your latitude.

House divisions for a northern latitude city. The sun is in the third house and is expected to rise after 4 hours. The sunrise to sunset arc is 180 degrees, but covers almost 8 houses, reflecting a day of over 14 hours.

A small movie showing the wobble of the ecliptic over a day. The ecliptic orange disk intersects the green disk topocentric at the ascendant and descendant

=== Chart gallery ===
The following charts display different house systems for the same time and location. To better compare systems subject to distortion, a high latitude city was chosen (Stockholm, Sweden) and the time corresponds to a long ascension sign (Cancer). For clarity purposes, all the usual aspect lines, degrees and glyphs were removed.

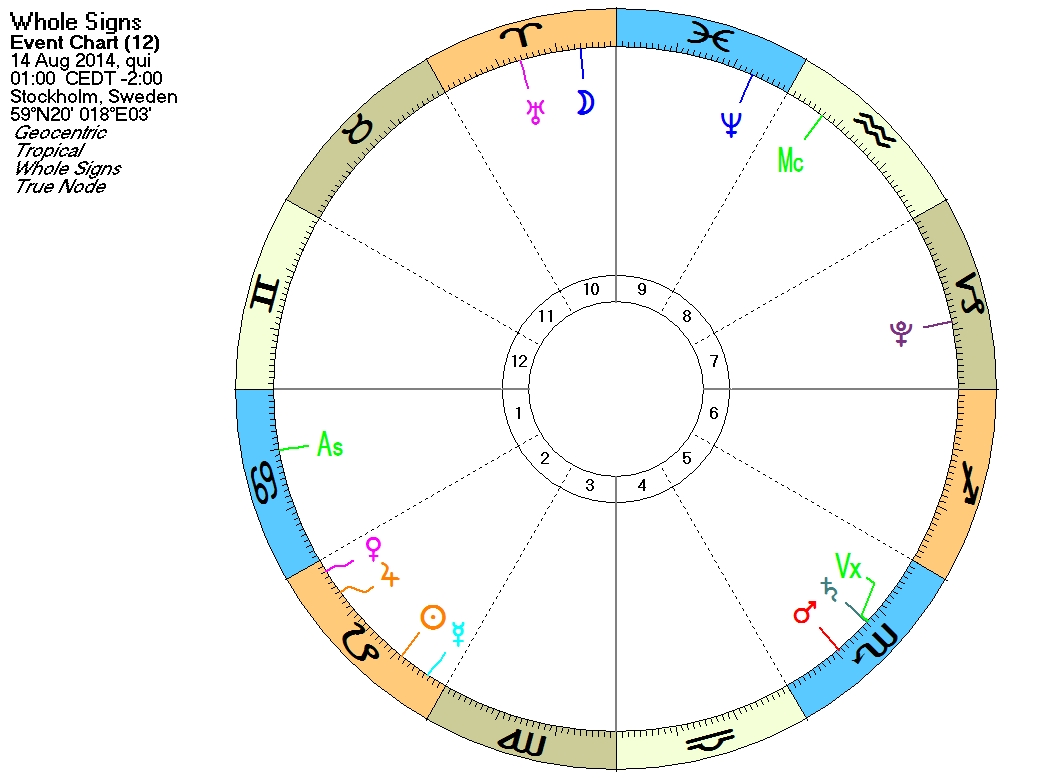
Whole Sign house divisions

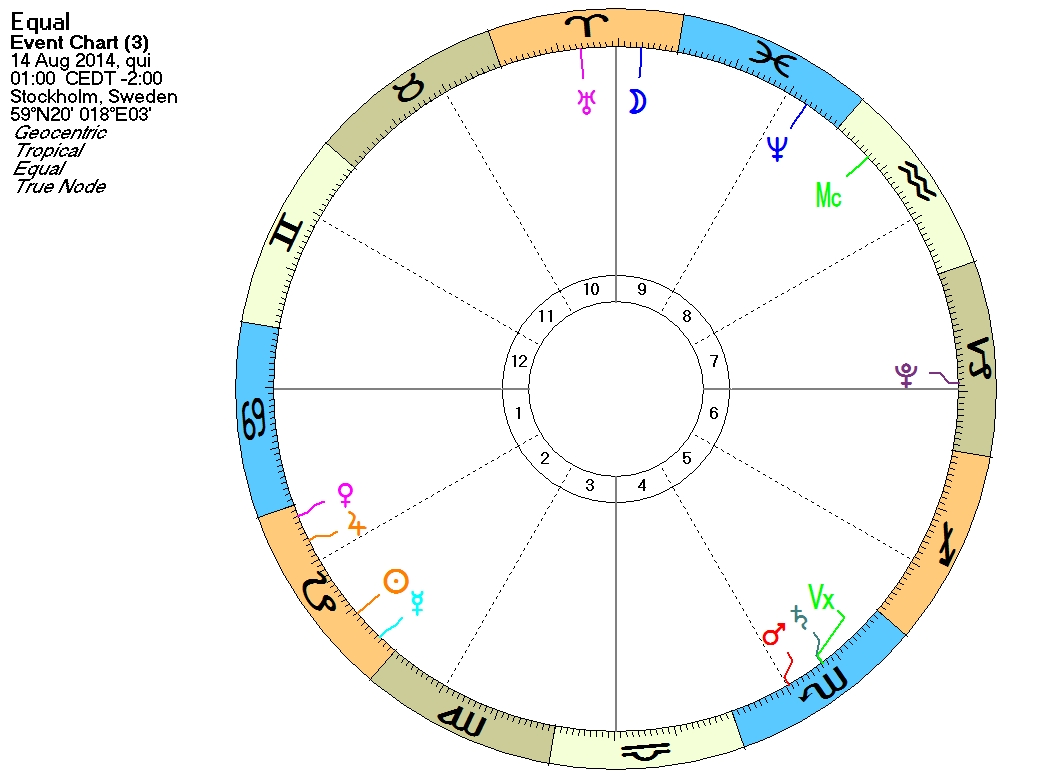
Equal (Asc) house divisions

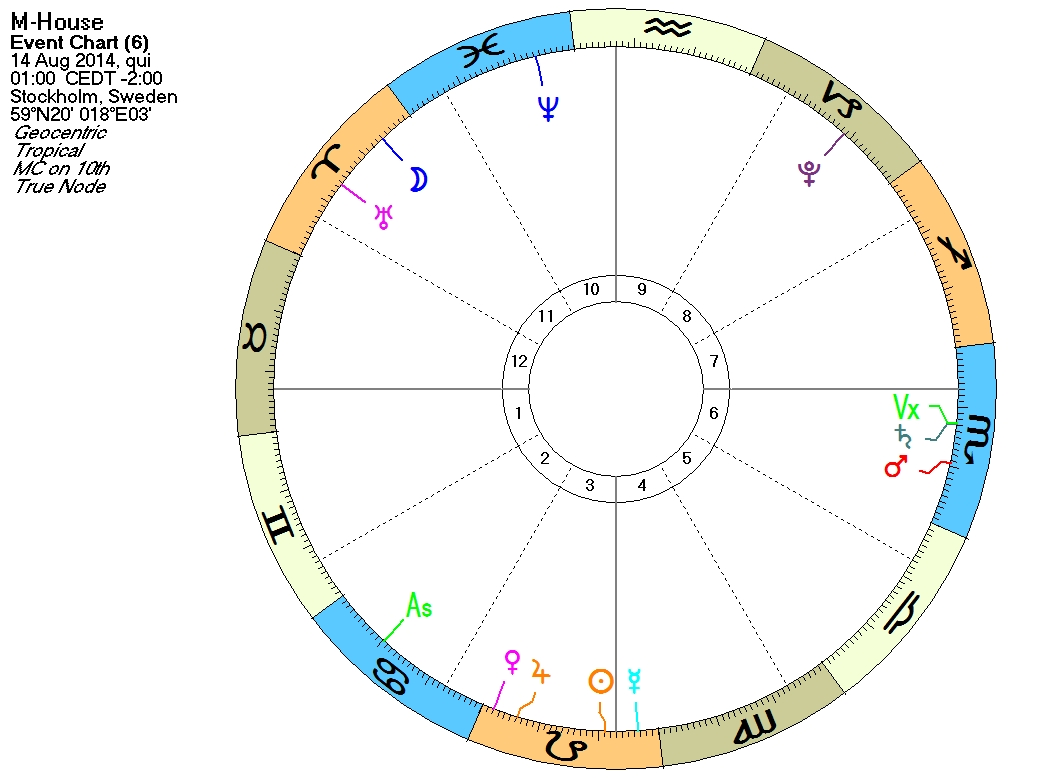
M-House house divisions

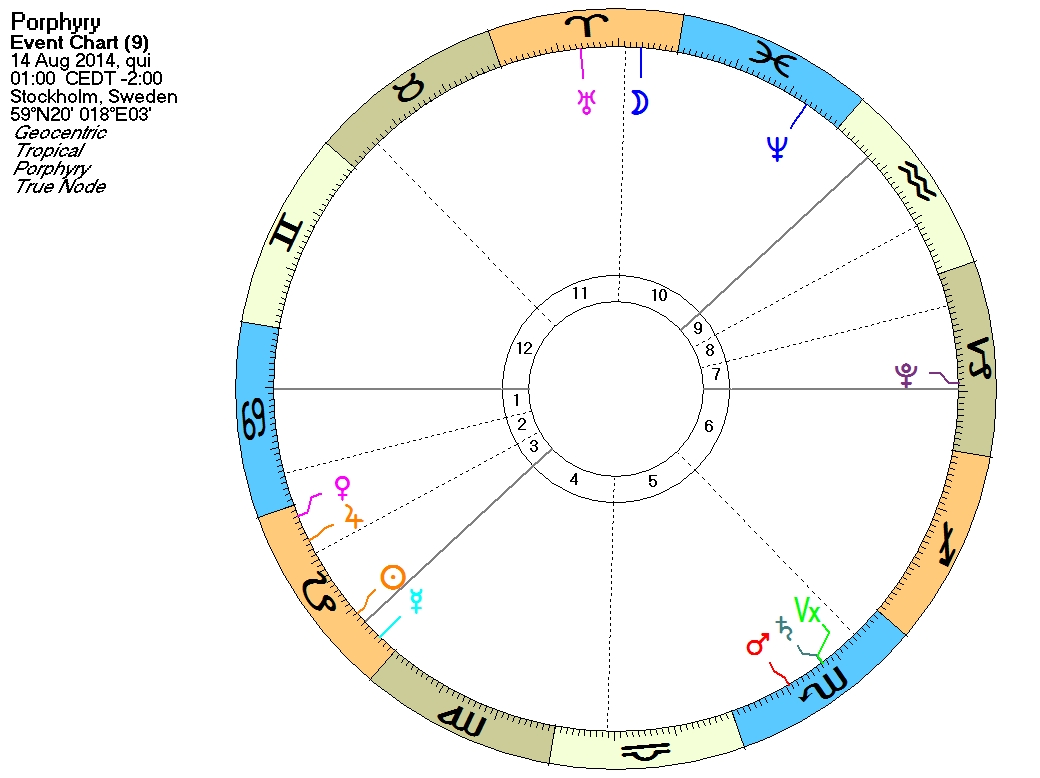
Porphyry house divisions

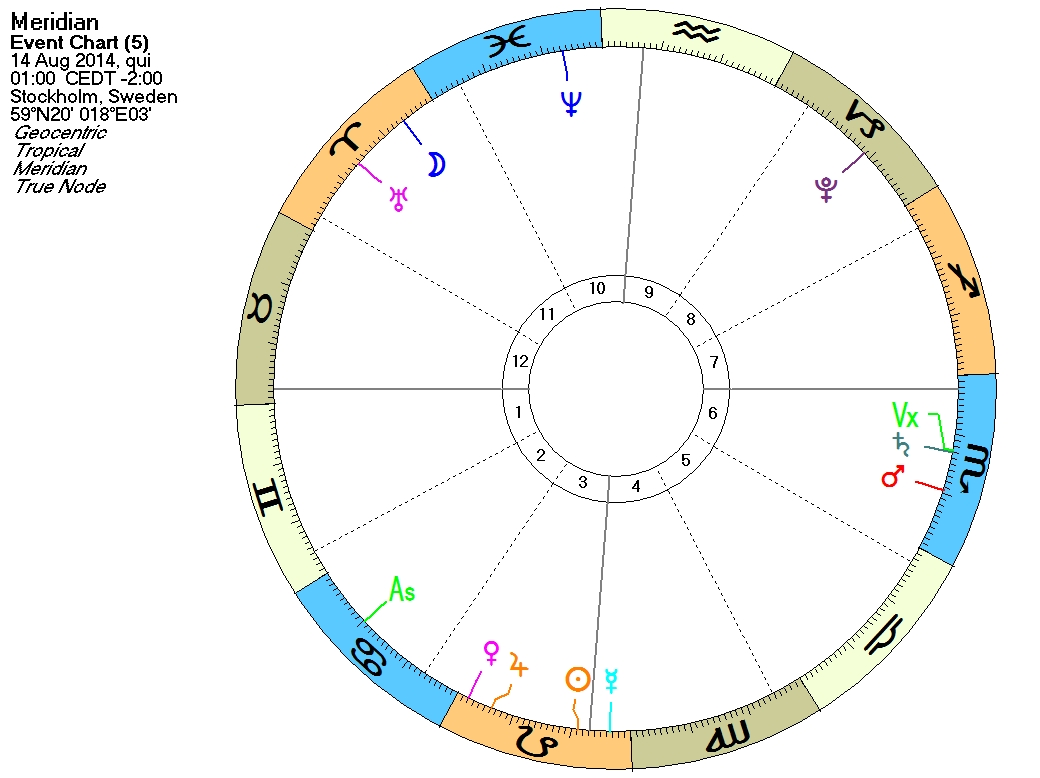
Meridian house divisions

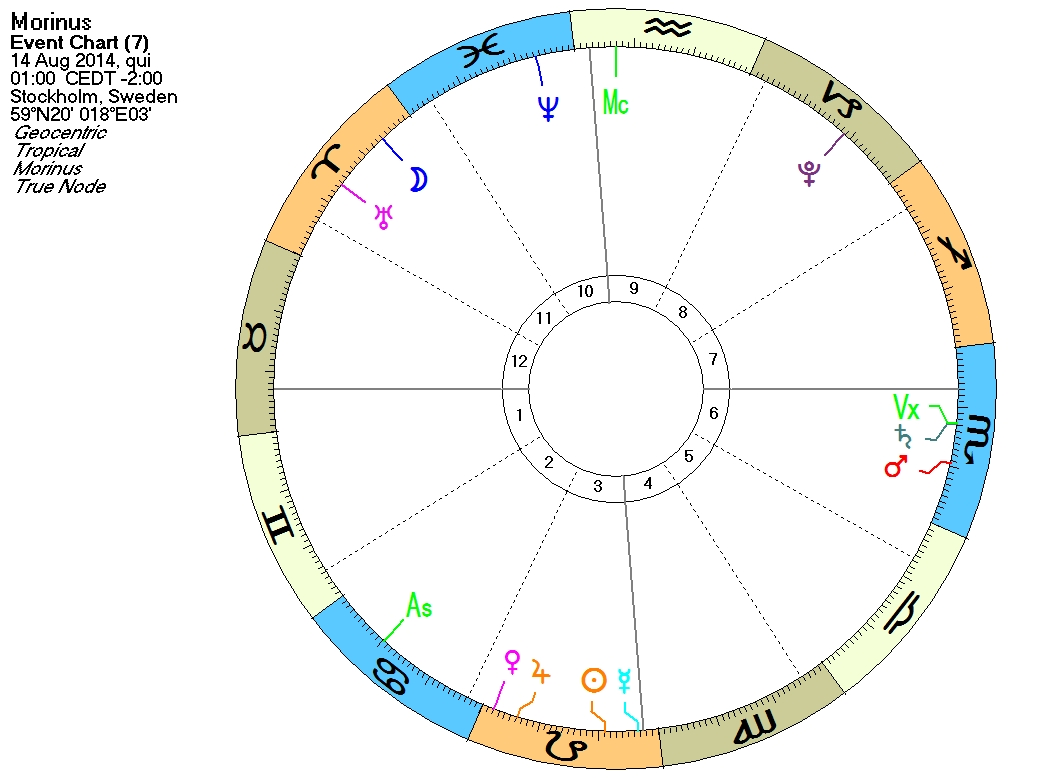
Morinus house divisions

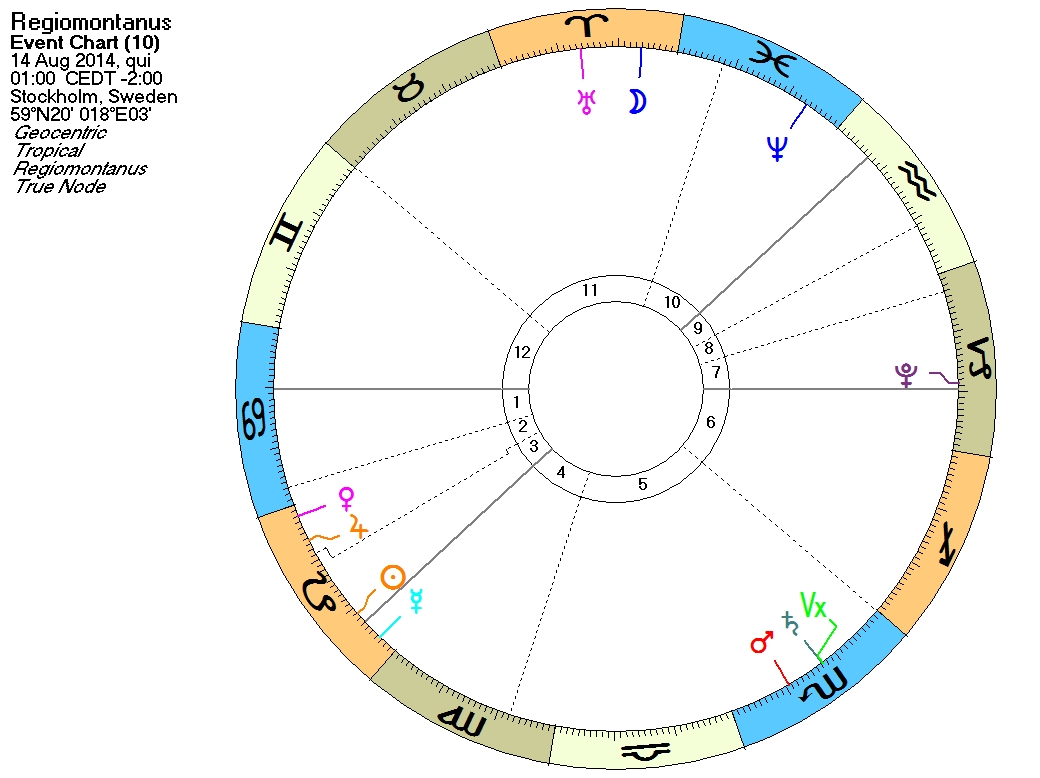
Regiomontanus house divisions

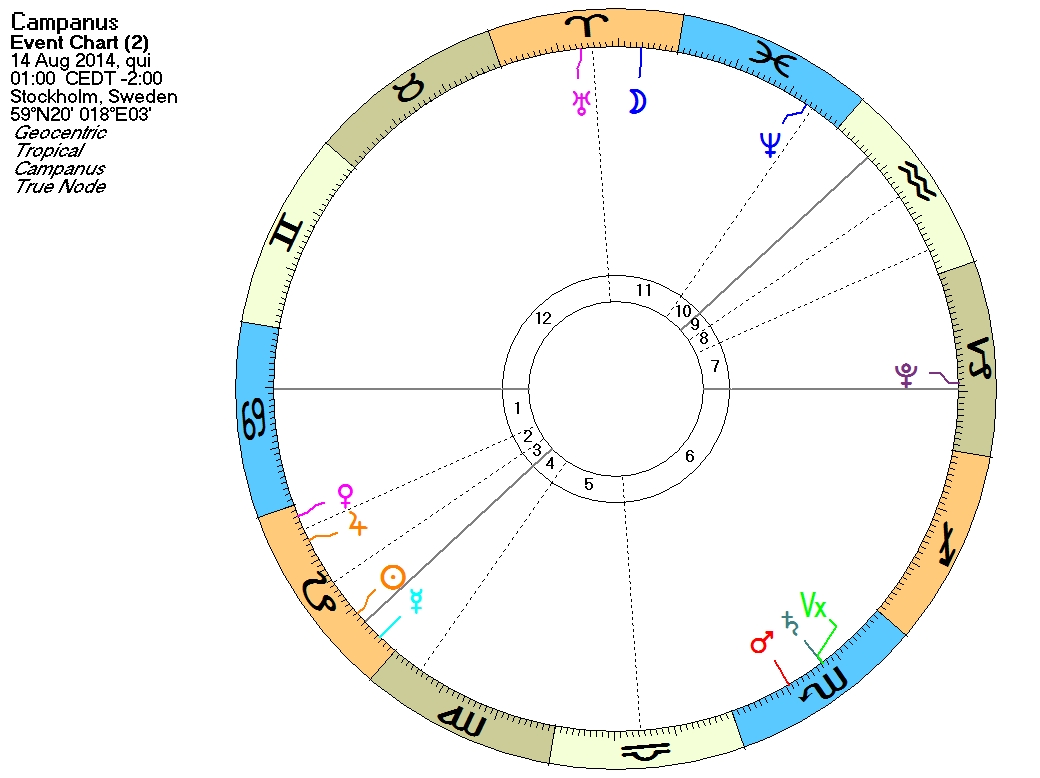
Campanus house divisions

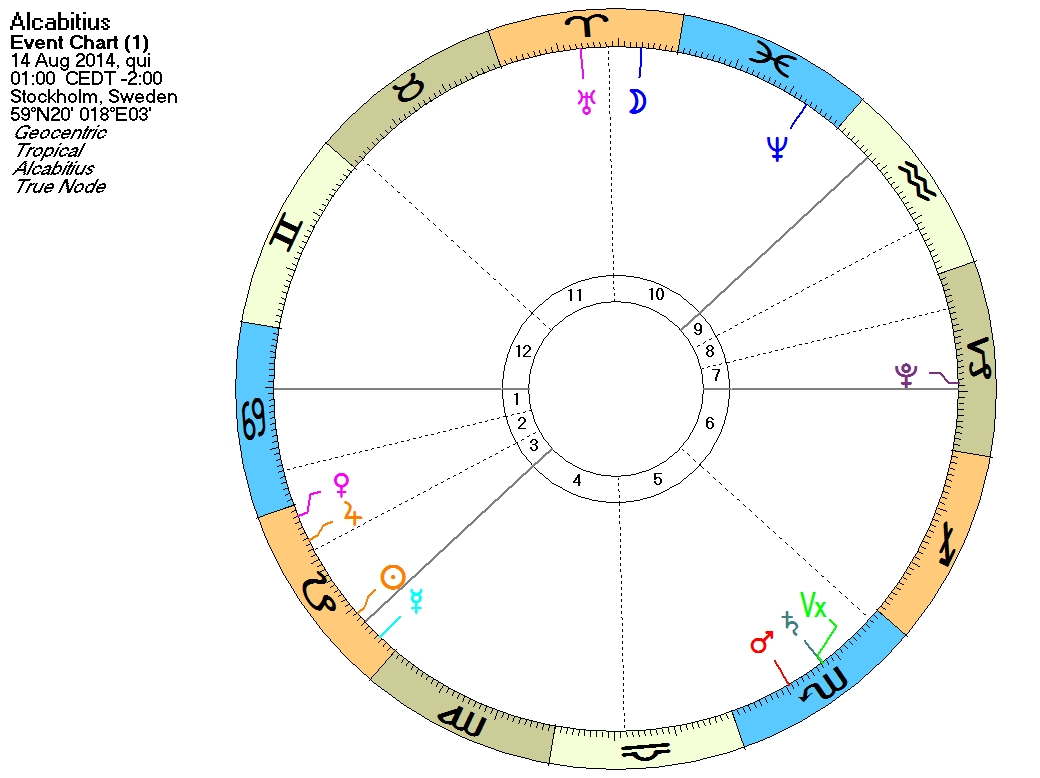
Alcabitius house divisions

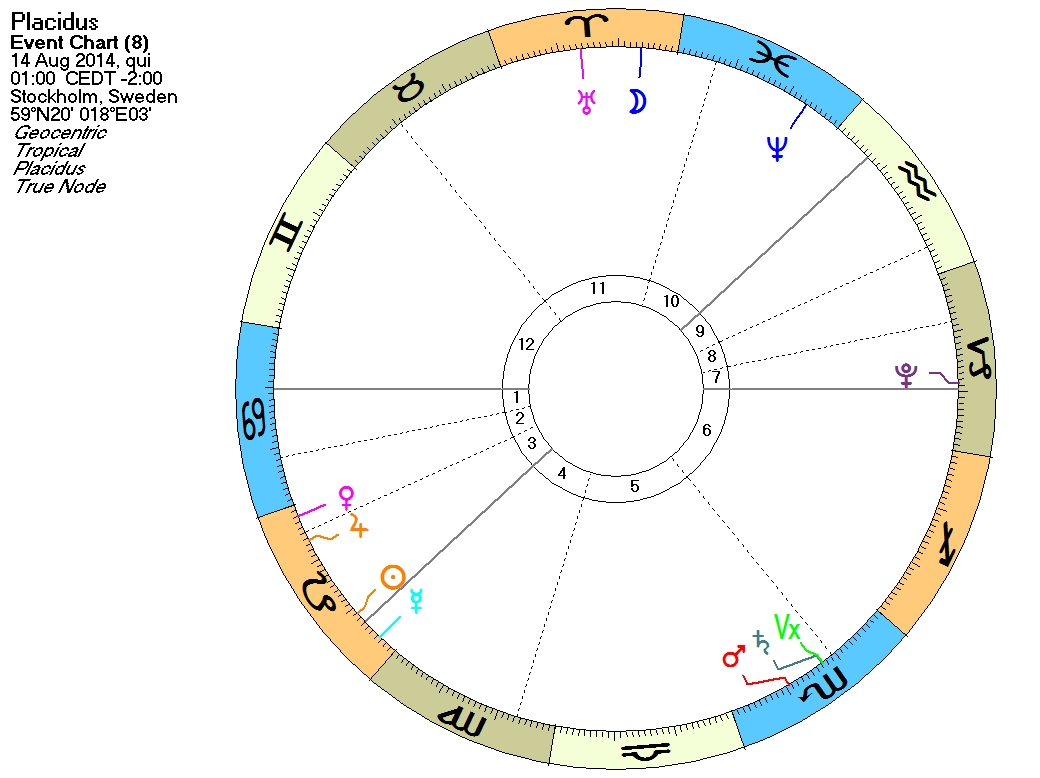
Placidus house divisions

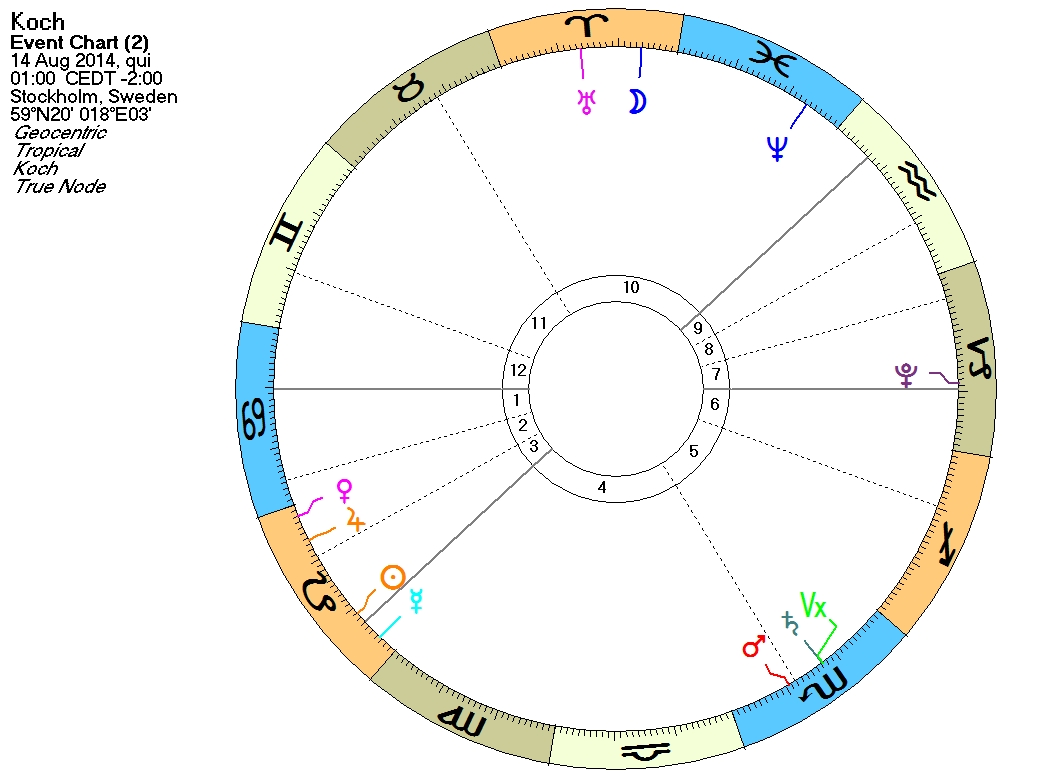
Koch house divisions

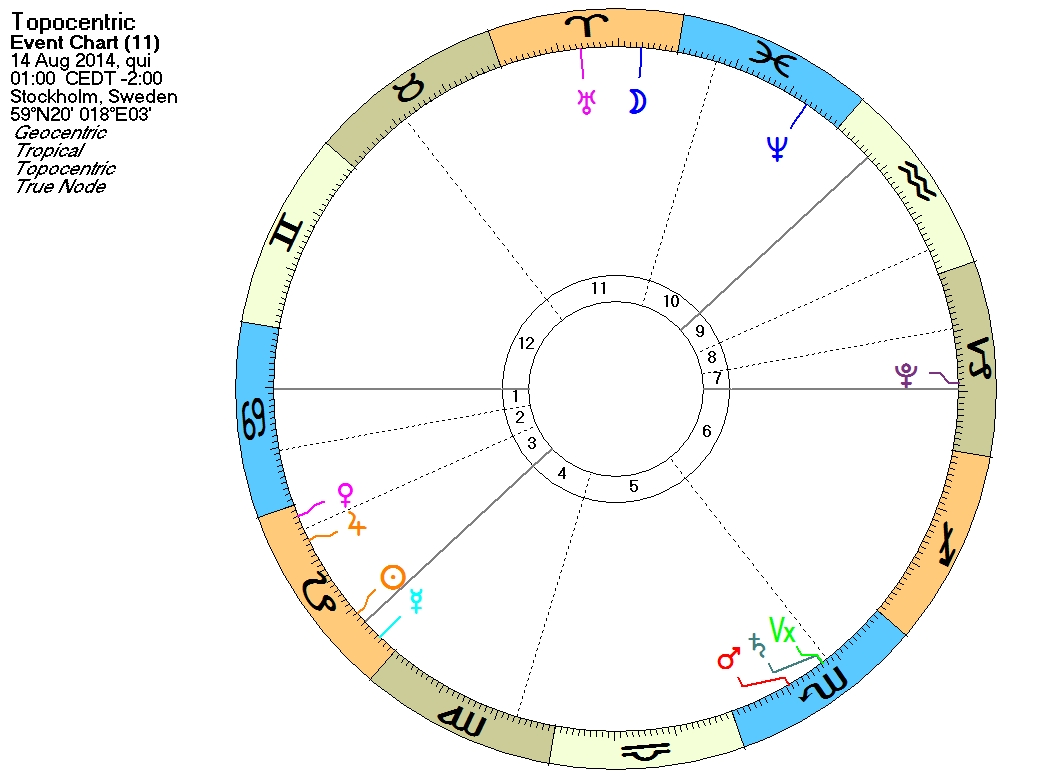
Topocentric house divisions

=== The MC in non-quadrant house systems ===
In the whole sign and equal house systems the Medium Coeli (Midheaven), the highest point in the chart, does not act as the cusp or starting point of the 10th house. Instead the MC moves around the top half of the chart, and can land anywhere in the 7th, 8th, 9th, 10th, 11th, 12th, depending on the latitude. The MC retains its commonly agreed significations, but it does not act as the starting point of the 10th house, whereas the Equal house system adds extra definition and meaning to the MC including any cusps involved, any interpretations applied to the MC itself concur with other house systems.

This is also the more common criticism of the whole sign and equal house method as it concerns the location of the Medium Coeli (Midheaven), the highest point in the chart. In the equal house system, the ascendant/descendant and midheaven/IC axes can vary from being perpendicular to each other (from approx. +-5 deg at most at equator to approx. +-15 degrees at Alexandria to +-90 degrees at polar circle). As a result, equal houses counted from the ascendant cannot in general place the midheaven on the tenth house cusp, where many feel it would be symbolically desirable. Since this point is associated with ambition, career, and public image, the argument is that the Midheaven, therefore, must be the cusp of the similar tenth house. It has also been linked by extension with Capricorn (the tenth sign of the zodiac). The equal house system always takes the MC to be first and foremost THE most important indicator of career; whereas the 10th house cusp, while taken into account, is interpreted simply as a weaker 2nd MC cusp. The Midheaven is not associated with house locations defined by the Whole Sign and Equal House system, rather, the Midheaven placement relies on the specific location of the Ascendant, so the Midheaven can be found anywhere between the 8th and 11th houses.

== Rulership ==
In Hellenistic, Vedic, Medieval and Renaissance astrology each house is ruled by the planet that rules the sign on its cusp. For example, if a person has the sign Aries on the cusp of their 7th house, the planet Mars is said to "rule" the 7th house. This means that when a planet is allotted a house, the planet's attributes will have some bearing on the topics related to that house within the life of the individual whose chart is being analyzed. This planet is considered very important for events specifically pertaining to that house's topics; in fact, its placement in the chart will have at least as much influence on the chart as the planets placed within the house. In traditional Western and Hindu astrology, each sign is ruled by one of the 7 visible planets (note that in astrology, the Sun and Moon are considered planets, which literally means wanderers, i.e. wandering stars, as opposed to the fixed stars of the constellations).

In addition, some modern astrologers who follow the X=Y=Z or Planet=Sign=House doctrine, which was first taught by Alan Leo in the early part of the 20th century, believe that certain houses are also ruled by—or have an affinity with—the planet which rules the corresponding zodiacal sign. For instance, Mars is ruler of the 1st house because it rules Aries, the first sign; Mercury rules (or has an affinity with) the 3rd house because it rules Gemini, the 3rd sign; etc. This concept is sometimes referred to as "natural rulership", as opposed to the former which is known as "accidental rulership".

== See also ==
- Jean-Baptiste Morin
