= Walter Koch (astrologer) =

German astrologer

Dr. Walter Albert Koch (18 September 1895 – 25 February 1970) was a German astrologer who founded the Koch House System in Astrology. He was born in Esslingen, Baden-Württemberg, Germany and died in Göppingen.

Like many German astrologers of those days he was imprisoned in the Dachau concentration camp (1941–45). In early 1960s he put forward the Koch House System. He also did research on the psychological and esoteric effects of colors and gems.

== Koch House System ==
Also called the Birthplace House System. Tables for this system first appeared in 1971, in an English translation of the work of Walter Koch. In spite of the claims of priority and originality made for this method, it is but a simple modification of the Alchabitius System. The following charts display the two house systems for the same time and location. To better compare systems subject to distortion, a high latitude city was chosen (Stockholm, Sweden) and the time corresponds to a long ascension sign (Cancer). For clarity purposes, all the usual aspect lines, degrees and glyphs were removed.

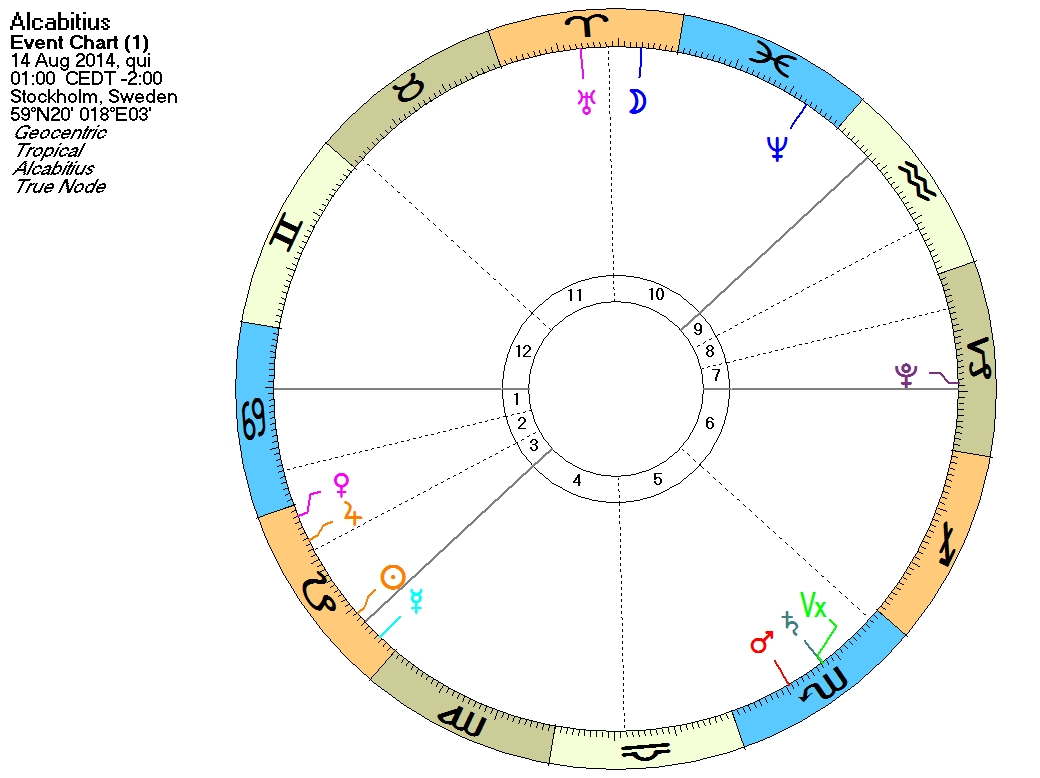
Alcabitius house divisions

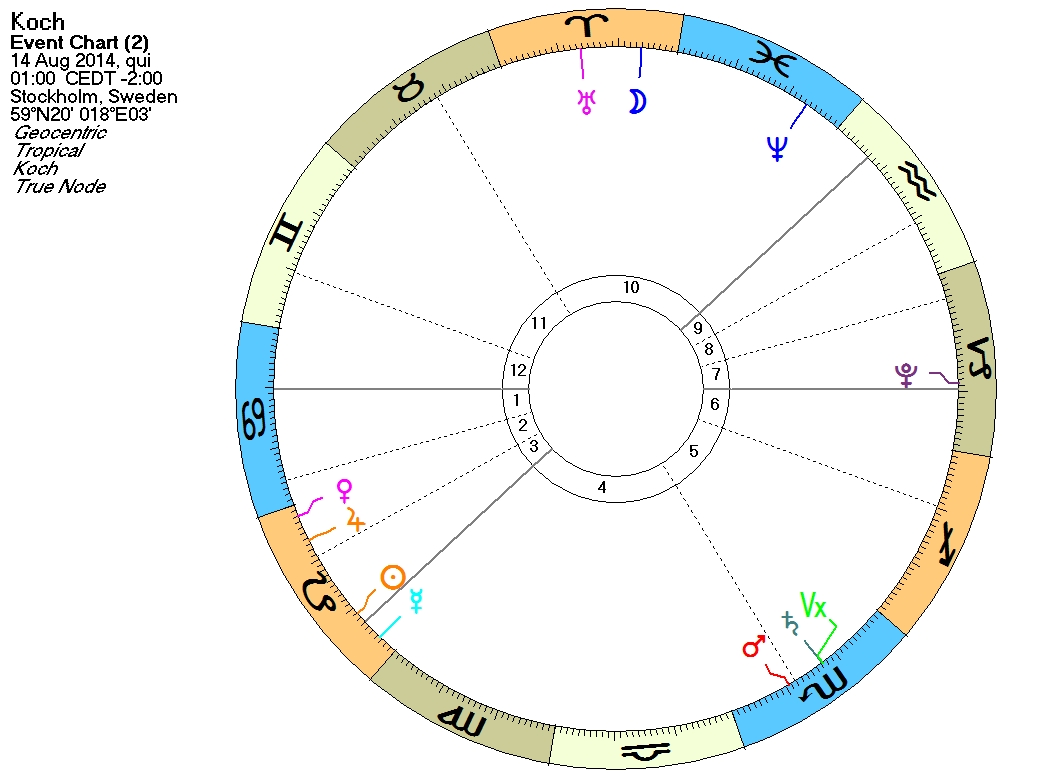
Koch house divisions

== Published works ==
- Psychologische Farbenlehre (1931)
- Seele der Edelsteine (1934)
- GOH Haeusertafeln (1965)
