= Pisces (astrology) =

Twelfth astrological sign of the zodiac

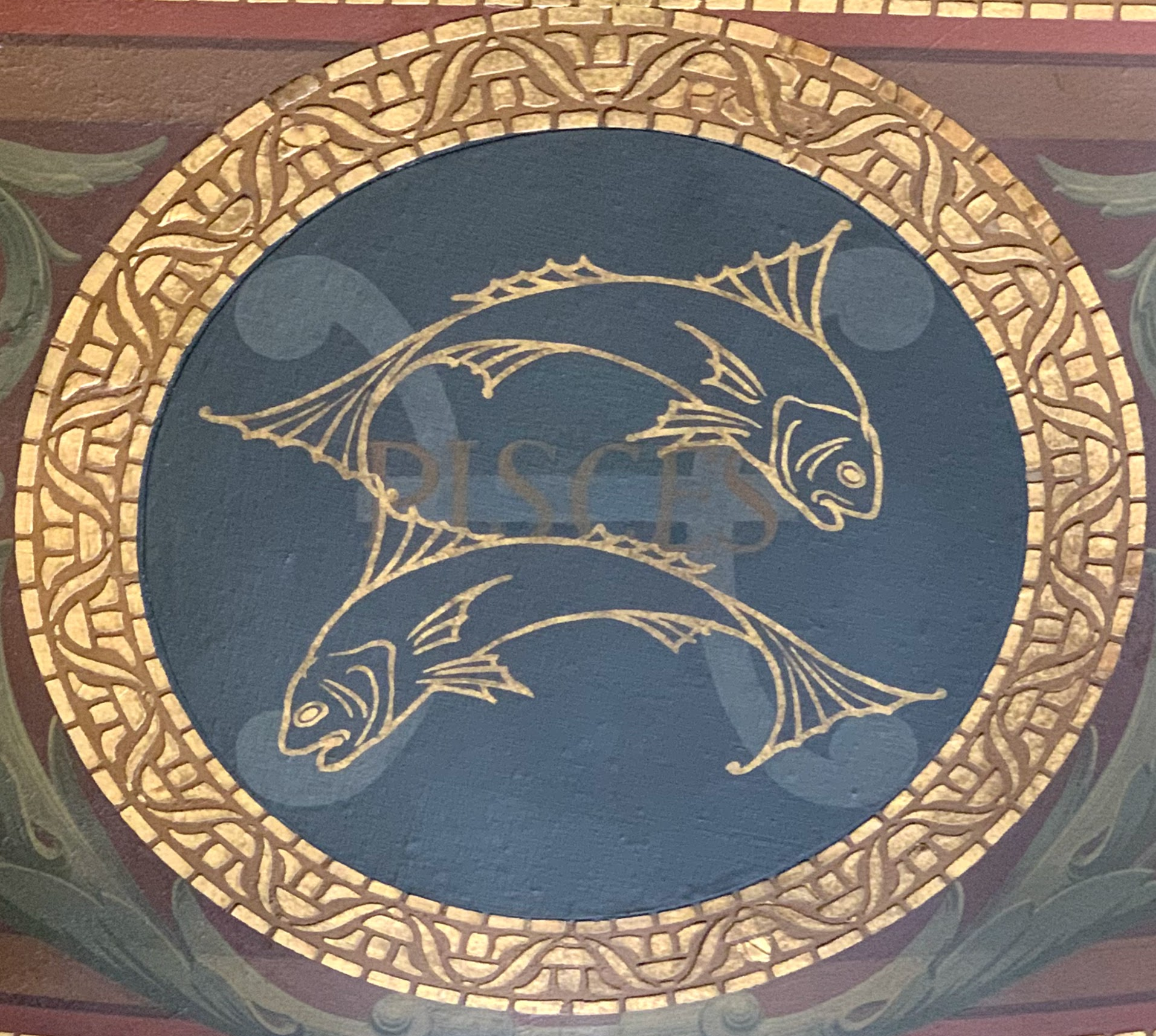
- Zodiac symbol: two fish
- Duration (tropical, western): February 18 – March 20 (2026, UT1)
- Constellation: Pisces
- Zodiac element: Water
- Zodiac quality: Mutable
- Sign ruler: Jupiter (traditional), Neptune (modern)
- Detriment: Mercury
- Exaltation: Venus
- Fall: Mercury

Pisces (♓︎; /ˈpaɪsiːz/; Ancient Greek: Ἰχθύες Ikhthyes, Latin for "fishes") is the twelfth and final astrological sign in the zodiac. It is a mutable sign. It spans 330° to 360° of celestial longitude. Under the tropical zodiac, the sun transits this area between about February 19 and March 20. (Note: The dates during which the sun is in Pisces, as with all the signs, is dependent on the leap year cycle; the dates February 19 to March 20 are given by Encyclopedia Britannica. Other sources give the beginning on February 20, and ending on March 21.) In classical interpretations, the symbol of the fish is derived from the ichthyocentaurs, who aided Aphrodite when she was born from the sea.

Some tropical astrologers believe the current astrological age is the Age of Pisces, while others maintain that currently it is the Age of Aquarius.

== Background ==
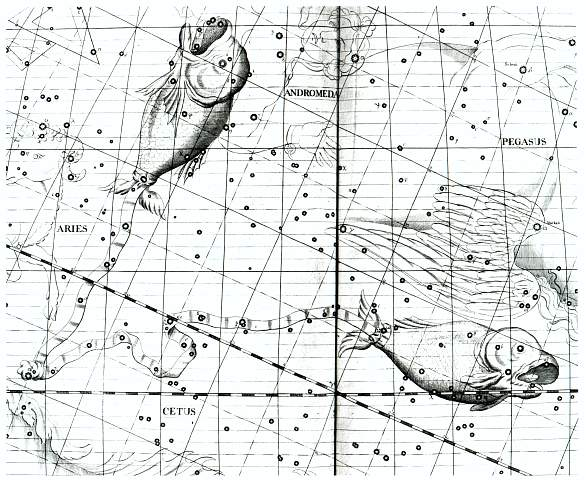
"A cord joins the tails of Pisces, the two fishes", from Atlas Coelestis

While the astrological sign Pisces per definition runs from ecliptic longitude 330° to 0°, this position is now mostly covered by the constellation of Aquarius due to the precession from when the constellation and the sign coincided. Today, the First Point of Aries, or the vernal equinox, is in the constellation Pisces. There are no prominent stars in the constellation, with the brightest stars being of only fourth magnitude. One star in the constellation, Alpha Piscium, is also known as Alrescha, which comes from the Arabic: الرشآء, romanized: al-rišā’, meaning "the well rope", or "the cord". The constellation, however, is different from the astronomical location where the sign occupies space. The constellations in earlier times were primarily used as markers to help determine what influence was in the sky. Nevertheless, the sign of Pisces remains in the 30-degree span of 330°–0°.

Ptolemy described Alpha Piscium as the point where the cords joining the two fish are knotted together. The astrological symbol shows the two fishes captured by a string, typically by the mouth or the tails. The fish are usually portrayed swimming in opposite directions; this represents the duality within the Piscean nature. They are ruled by the planet Jupiter (Neptune in modern astrology). Although they appear as a pair, the name of the sign in all languages originally referred to only one fish with the exception of Greek, Ukrainian, Polish, Romanian, Bulgarian, Russian, Dutch, Finnish, Swedish, Hungarian, Latvian, Lithuanian, Italian and Portuguese. Pisces is the mutable water sign of the zodiac.

== Mythology ==
Divine associations with Pisces include Poseidon/Neptune, Aphrodite, Eros, Typhon, Vishnu and the Sumerian goddess Inanna.

=== In early mythology ===
"Pisces" is the Latin word for "fishes". It is one of the earliest zodiac signs on record, with the two fish appearing as far back as c. 2300 BC on an Egyptian coffin lid.

According to one Greek myth, Pisces represents the fish, sometimes represented by a shark, into which Aphrodite (also considered Venus) and her son Eros (also considered Cupid) transformed in order to escape the monster Typhon. Typhon, the "father of all monsters", had been sent by Gaia to attack the gods, which led Pan to warn the others before himself changing into a goat-fish and jumping into the Euphrates. A similar myth, one in which the fish "Pisces" carries Aphrodite and her son out of danger, is resounded in Manilius' five-volume poetic work Astronomica: "Venus ow'd her safety to their Shape." Another myth is that an egg fell into the Euphrates River. It was then rolled to the shore by fish. Doves sat on the egg until it hatched, out from which came Aphrodite. As a sign of gratitude towards the fish, Aphrodite put the fish into the night sky. Because of these myths, the Pisces constellation was also known as "Venus et Cupido", "Venus Syria cum Cupidine", "Venus cum Adone", "Dione" and "Veneris Mater", the latter being the formal Latin term for mother.

The Greek myth on the origin of the sign of Pisces has been cited by English astrologer Richard James Morrison as an example of the fables that arose from the original astrological doctrine, and that the "original intent of [it] was afterwards corrupted both by poets and by priests."

=== In modern mythologies and religion ===
Purim, a Jewish holiday, falls at the full moon preceding the Passover, which was set by the full moon in Aries, which follows Pisces. The story of the birth of Christ is said to be a result of the spring equinox entering into the Pisces, as the Savior of the World appeared as the Fisher of Men. This parallels the entering into the Age of Pisces.

==== Astrological age ====
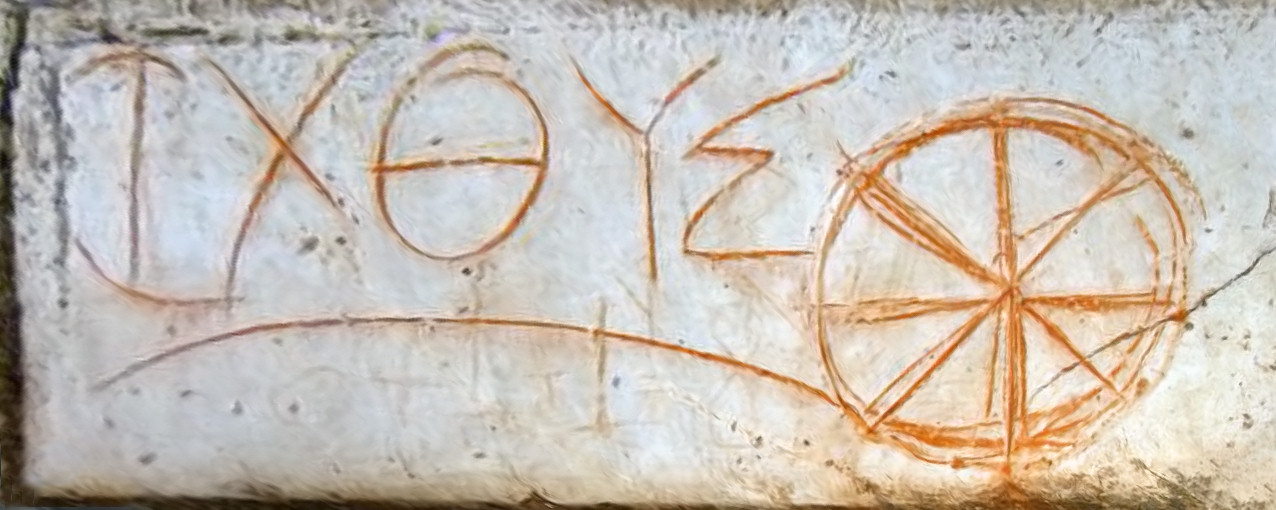
Early Christian ichthys inscription at ruins of Ephesus, modern day Turkey

An astrological age is a time period in astrology that parallels major changes in the development of Earth's inhabitants, particularly relating to culture, society and politics, and there are twelve astrological ages corresponding to the twelve zodiacal signs. Astrological ages occur because of a phenomenon known as the precession of the equinoxes, and one complete period of this precession is called a Great Year or Platonic Year of about 25,920 years.

The age of Pisces began c. AD 1 and will end c. AD 2150. (Note: There are some discrepancies in when the astrological ages begin and end. The variation in the "Age of Pisces" is said to be from AD 1 until AD 2150, AD 498 to AD 2656, and 100-90 BC until AD 2680 according to the interpretations of Neil Mann, Heindel Rosicrucian, and Shephard Simpson, respectively.) With the story of the birth of Christ coinciding with this date, many Christian symbols for Christ use the astrological symbol for Pisces, the fishes. The figure Christ himself bears many of the temperaments and personality traits of a Pisces, and is thus considered an archetype of the Piscean. Moreover, the twelve apostles were called the "fishers of men", early Christians called themselves "little fishes", and a code word for Jesus was the Greek word for fish, "ΙΧΘΥΣ ICHTHYS". With this, the start of the age, or the "Great Month of Pisces", is regarded as the beginning of the Christian religion. Saint Peter is recognized as the apostle of the Piscean sign.

== In the arts ==
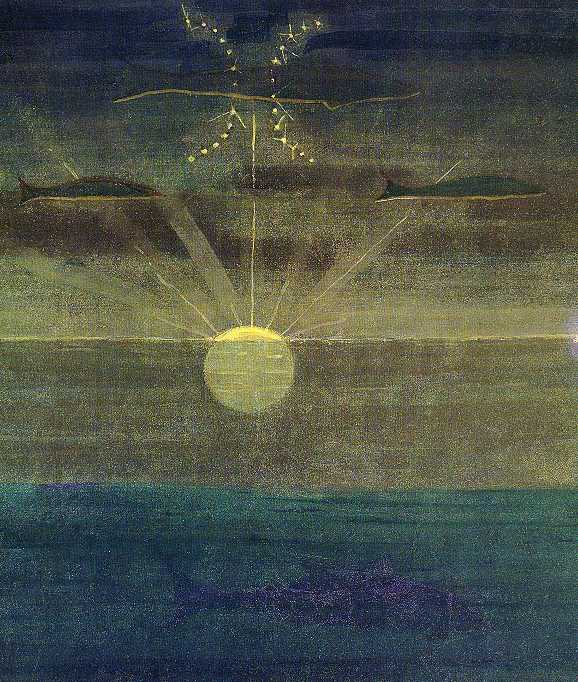
Žuvys (Pisces) by Mikalojus Konstantinas Čiurlionis

Venus exalted in Pisces is representative of divine love in the first canto of Dante's Purgatorio. Pisces is the subject of Luca Della Robbia's 15th century Plate with the Month of February. They are also the subject of one of Elizabeth Barrett Browning's poetic works:

And here fantastic fishes duskly float,
Using the calm for waters, while their fires
Throb out quick rhythms along the shallow air.

— Elizabeth Barrett Browning, A Drama of Exile

== In popular culture ==
In the January 1970 edition of the Avengers (No. 72), the supervillain group Zodiac introduced the member "Pisces" whose abilities allowed him to live underwater, which included fins, scales and gills.

In the 1979 sports fantasy film The Fish That Saved Pittsburgh, the fictitious basketball team the "Pittsburgh Pythons" turn to astrology after a continuous losing streak, and fill the roster with players born under the astrological sign of Pisces. They are reborn as the "Pittsburgh Pisces" and enter into a championship.

Oscar J. Kambly, inventor of Goldfish crackers, designed the cracker's signature fish shape as a tribute to his wife, a Pisces.

== Gallery ==
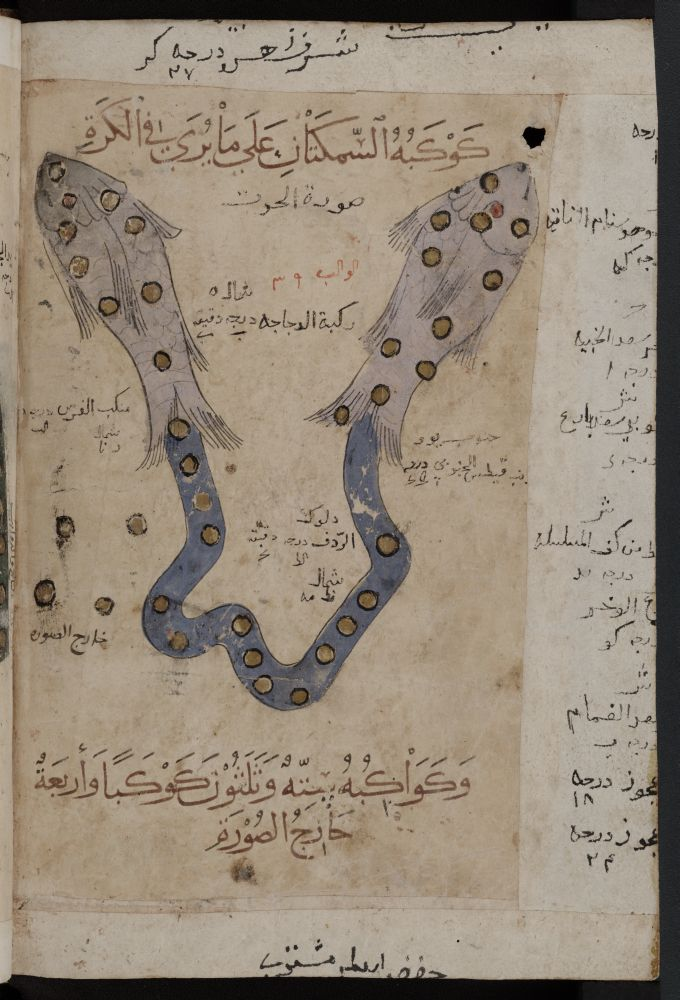
Depicted in 14th century Arabic manuscript, Book of Wonders

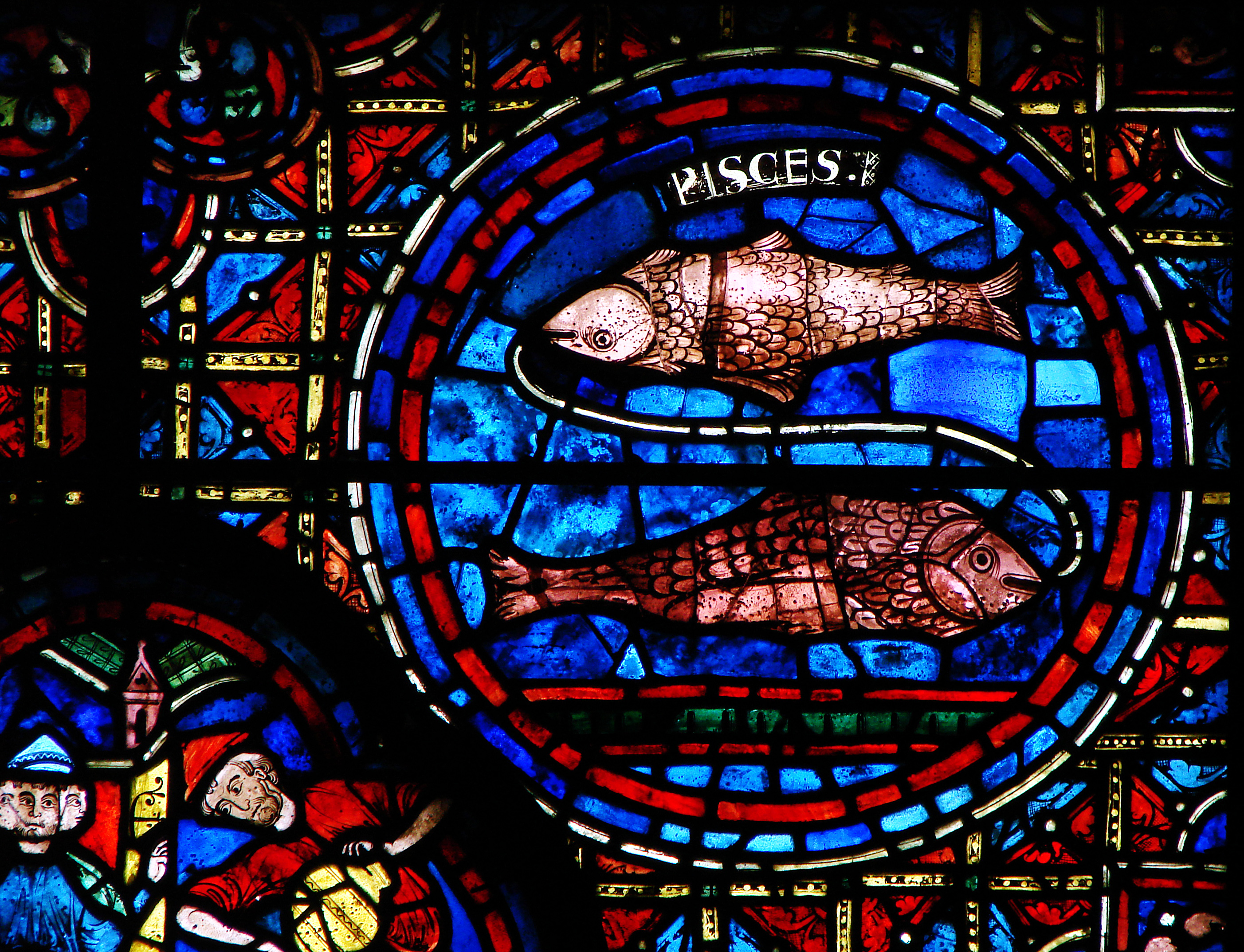
Appearing in Chartres Cathedral in Chartres

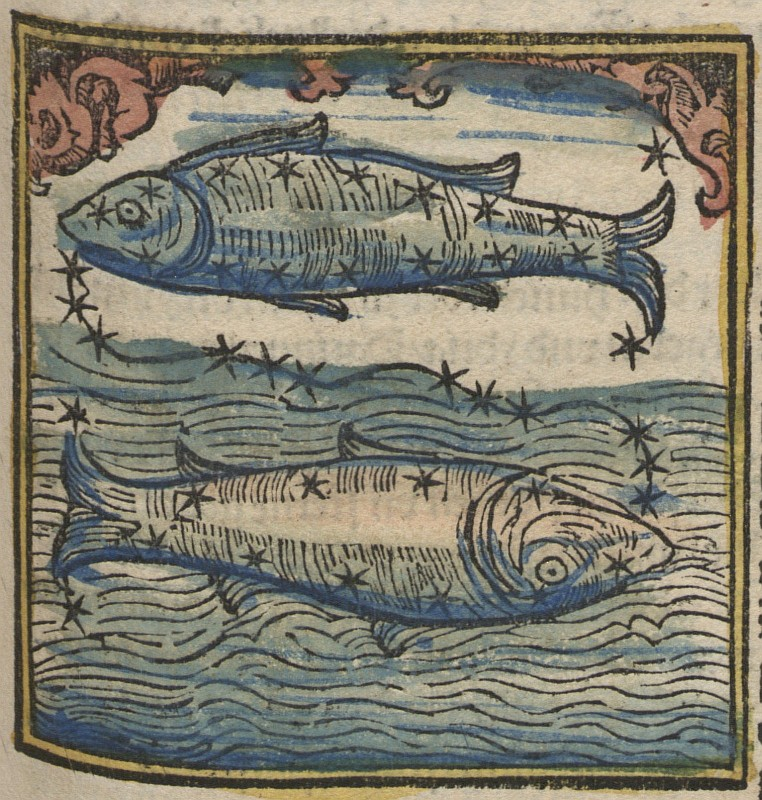
16th-century woodcut by Johannes Regiomontanus

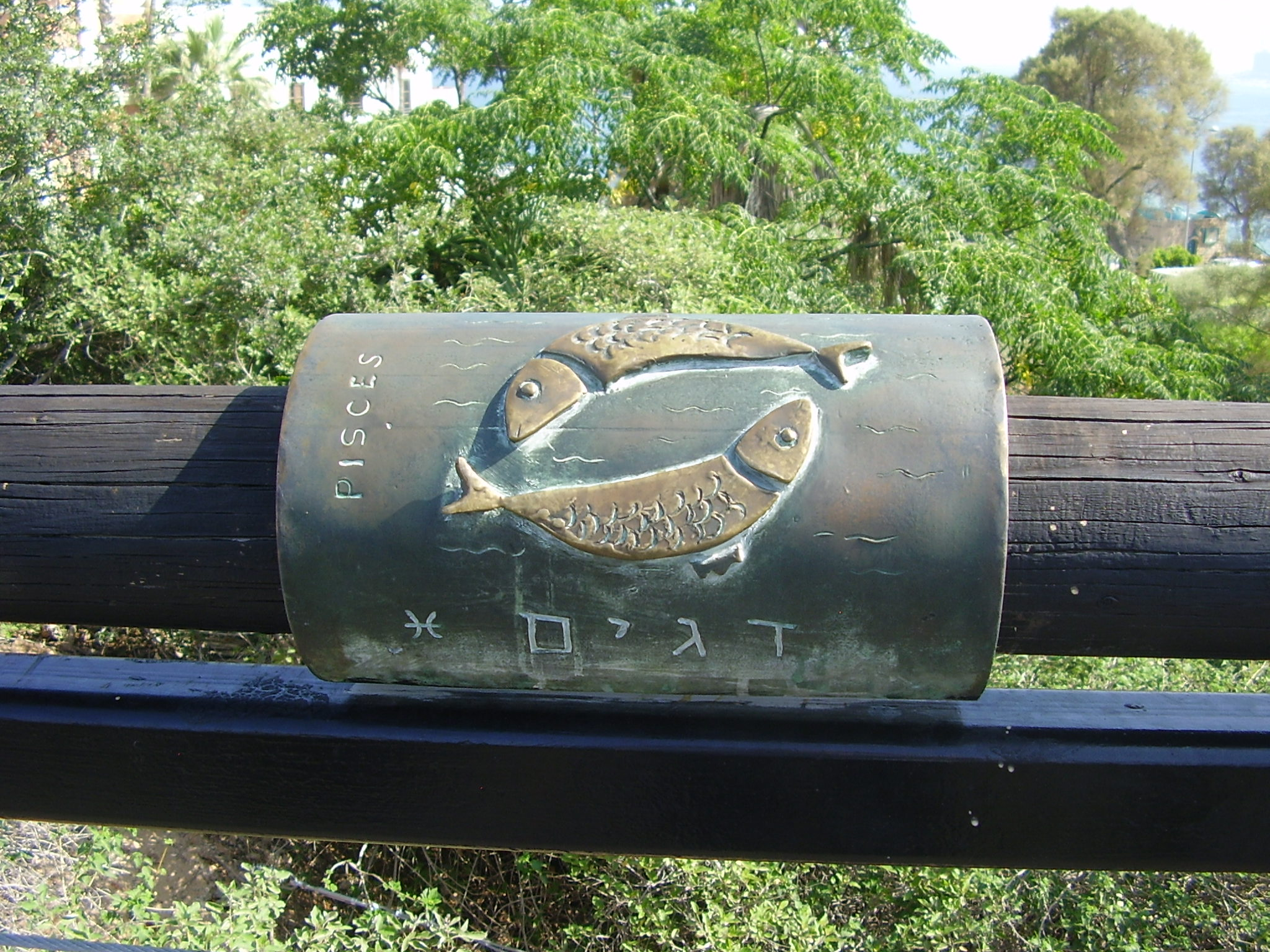
Pisces on "Wishing Bridge" in Old Jaffa, Tel Aviv, Israel

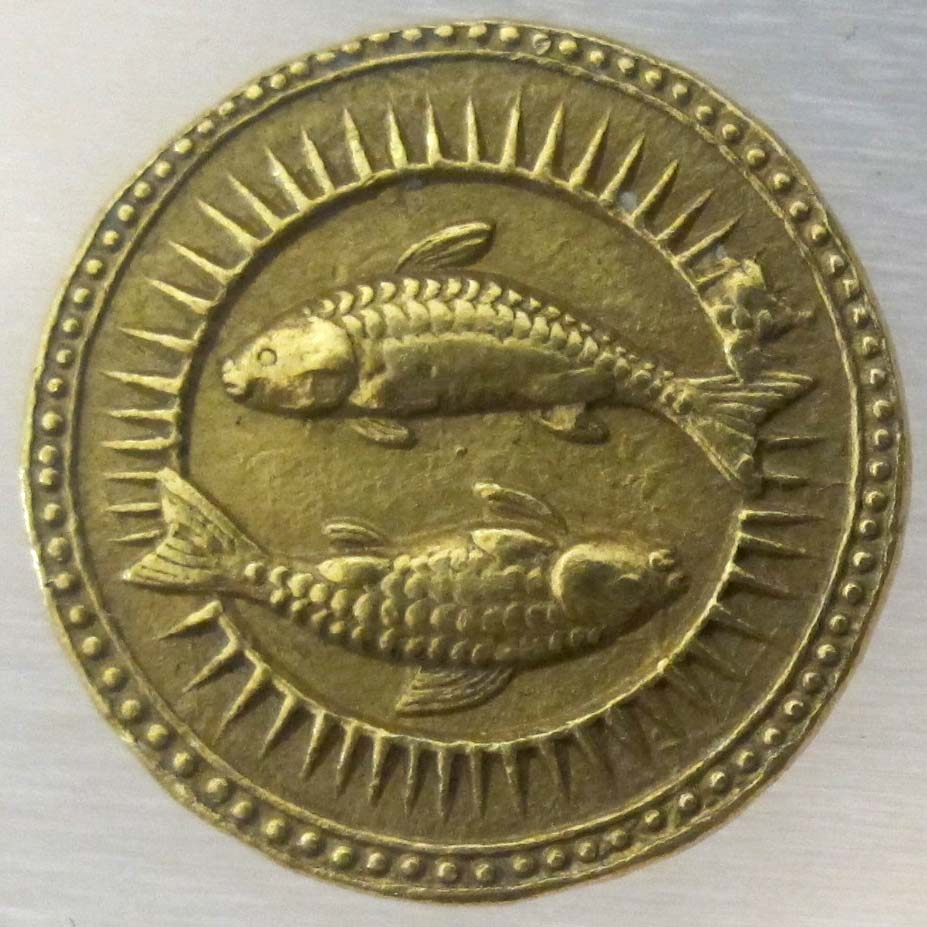
Gold coin minted during the reign of Jahangir depicting Pisces

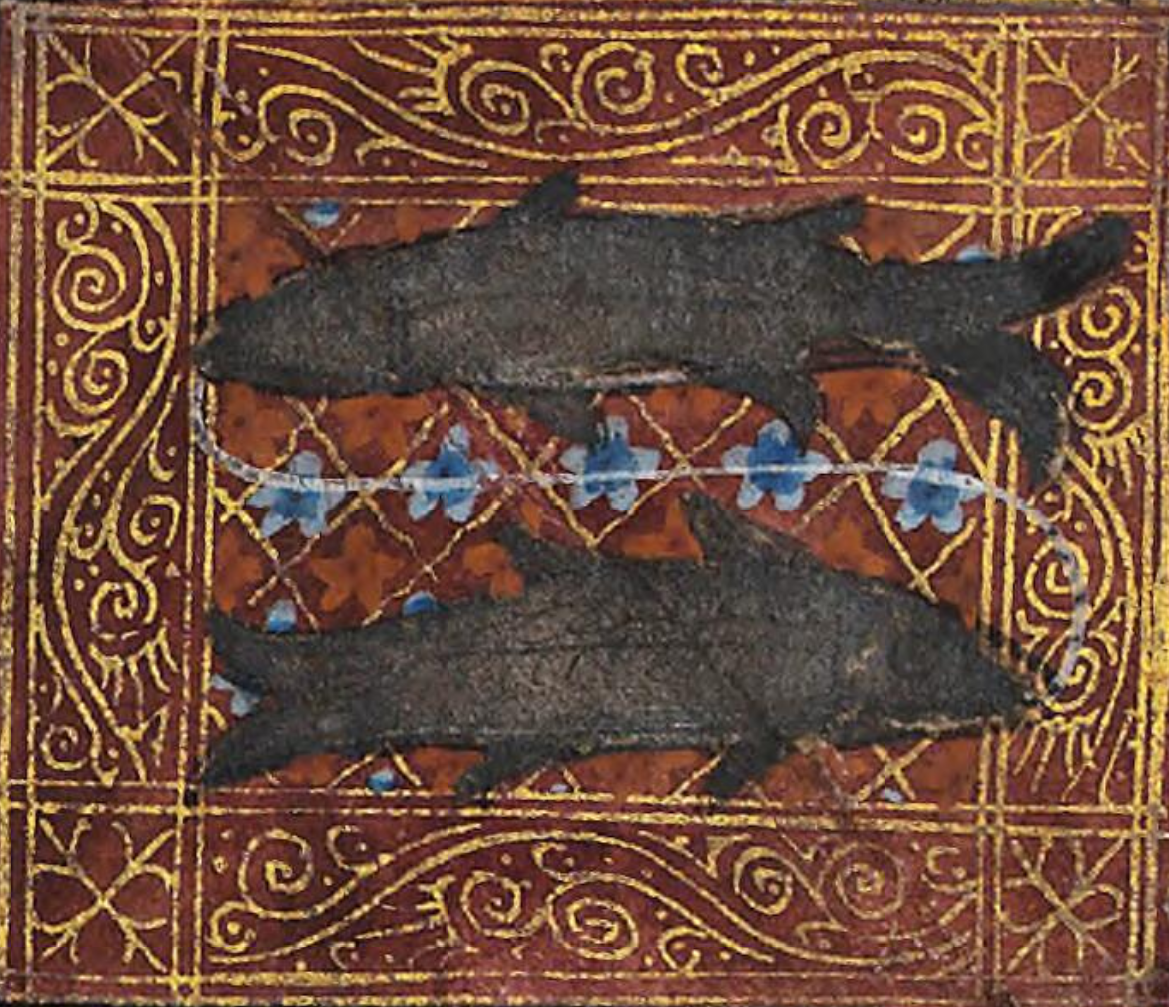
Depicted in a 14th western British Book of Hours

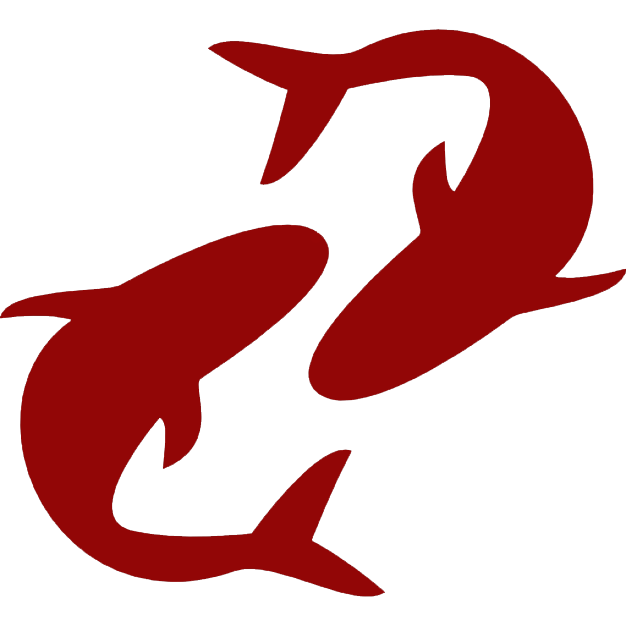
A representation of the Pisces symbol

== See also ==
- Astronomical symbols
- Chinese zodiac
- Circle of stars
- Cusp (astrology)
- Elements of the zodiac
- Hindu astrology
- Water (classical element)
