= Equatorial ascendant =

Sign rising over the Eastern Horizon

The equatorial ascendant is arc BE.

In astrology, the equatorial ascendant, or the East point, is the sign and degree rising over the Eastern Horizon at the Earth's equator at any given time. In the celestial sphere it corresponds to the intersection of the ecliptic with a great circle containing the ecliptic poles and the East point of the horizon.

== Calculation ==
Equations derived from spherical trigonometry allow for the conversion from equatorial coordinates to ecliptic coordinates. As points in the ecliptic have no latitude (β=0º) and the East point of the horizon has a right ascension 6^{h} higher than that of the meridian (or 90º more in hour angle), the equation that determines East Point's longitude can be written as:

$$\tan\lambda_{EP} = {\tan(\theta_{\rm L}+90^\circ)  \cos\varepsilon}$$

where $\theta_{\rm L}$ is the local sidereal time and $\varepsilon$ is the obliquity of the ecliptic. The equation can also be derived from the Ascendant at the equator ($\phi$=0º).

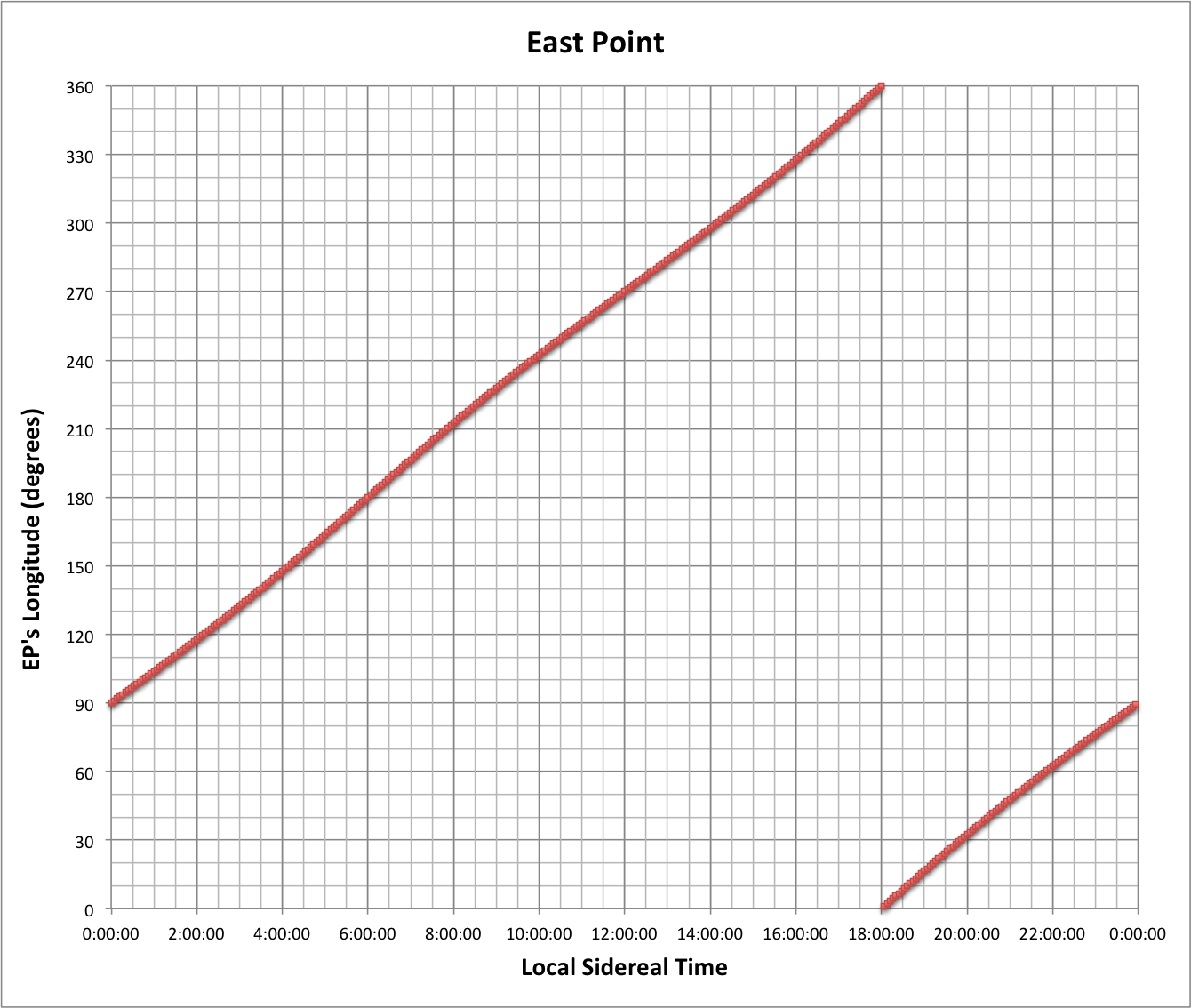
Longitude of East Point as function of Local Sidereal Time

- Angles in the degrees ( ° ), minutes ( ' ), and seconds ( " ) of sexagesimal measure must be converted to decimal before calculations are performed. Whether they are converted to decimal degrees or radians depends upon the particular calculating machine or program.
- Angles in the hours ( ^{h} ), minutes ( ^{m} ), and seconds ( ^{s} ) of time measure must be converted to decimal degrees or radians before calculations are performed. (1^{h} = 15° 1^{m} = 15' 1^{s} = 15")
- Angles greater than 360° (2π) or less than 0° may need to be reduced to the range 0° - 360° (0 - 2π) depending upon the particular calculating machine or program.
- When L.S.T. is 0^{h} 0^{m} 0^{s} ($\theta_{\rm L}$=0º), East Point's longitude is 90º.
- Inverse trigonometric functions are quadrant-ambiguous, and results should be carefully evaluated by taking into account that λ_{EP} is roughly 90º more than λ_{MC}.
- For the past 5 million years, Earth's obliquity has varied between 22.042500° and 24.50444°. The effect on λ_{EP} is less than 0.53°. For values referred to the standard equinox J2000.0 use 23.4392911°; for J1950.0 use 23.4457889°.

== See also ==
- Ascendant
