= Cusp (astrology) =

Imaginary line that separates a pair of consecutive astrological signs in the zodiac

In astrology, a cusp (from the Latin for spear or point) is the imaginary line that separates a pair of consecutive signs in the zodiac or houses in the horoscope.

Because the solar disc has a diameter of approximately half a degree, it is possible for the Sun to straddle the cusp as it moves across the sky. When this occurs at the moment of their birth, such a person is said to be "born on the cusp," and some interpretations of astrology hold that their life is influenced by the characteristics of both signs. For example, someone born when the Sun (by convention the point at the centre of the Solar disc) was located at 29 degrees, 50 minutes Gemini is said to have been born on the cusp of Gemini and Cancer, for much of the Solar disc was actually in Cancer even though its centre was in Gemini.

Although the term "cusp" is universally used for the boundaries of signs, not all astrologers agree that an object can ever be included in more than one sign. Many consider relevant only the location of the Sun's centre, which must be entirely in one sign, and would describe the natal Sun in the example above as simply being in Gemini. If late degrees of Gemini are considered to have a Cancer-like character, such astrologers would describe that as simply the nature of that part of Gemini rather than some influence spilling over from the next sign. In this view, in order to discover what sign the Sun was in, the exact time must be considered.

On the other hand, astrologers who consider objects "on the cusp" to be meaningfully different from objects entirely in one sign may apply such a description even when no part of the object crosses the boundary into the other. These astrologers may consider the Sun to be "on the cusp" even when its centre is as much as two degrees away from the sign boundary. They may also call other objects (much less than half a degree in diameter) "on the cusp" despite no part of the object being in the adjacent sign. Their claim is that the influence of the cusp weakens but does not suddenly disappear as the object gets further from the cusp.
