= Exaltation (astrology) =

Form of dignity for a planet

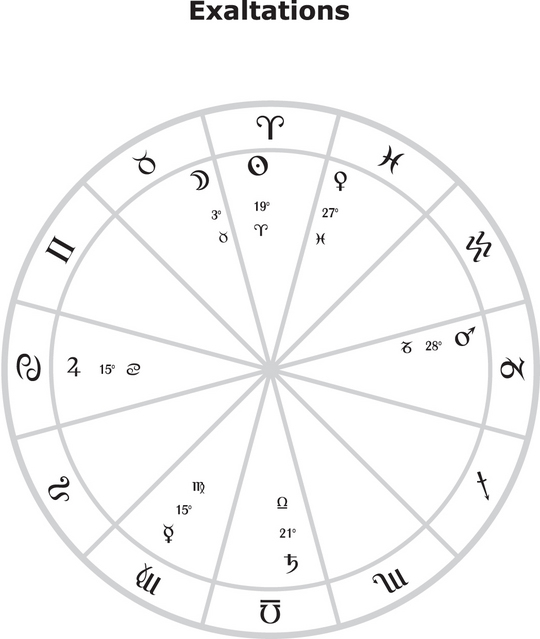
Exaltation Degrees of the Planets

In astrology, exaltation is one of the five essential dignities of a planet. The exaltation is a place of awareness for the planet, whereas the fall is a position of weakness concerning the function of the planet.

Each of the seven traditional planets has its exaltation in one zodiac sign. The positions are:

- Sun: 19th degree of Aries (i.e.., 18°00' - 18°59')
- Moon: 3rd degree of Taurus
- Mercury: 15th degree of Virgo
- Venus: 27th degree of Pisces
- Mars: 28th degree of Capricorn
- Jupiter: 15th degree of Cancer
- Saturn: 21st degree of Libra

Exaltations have also been attributed to the north node (3rd degree of Gemini) and the south node (3rd degree of Sagittarius). These positions are listed in astrological texts of the early medieval Arabic period, such as al-Biruni's 11th-century Book of Instruction in the Elements of the Art of Astrology. Whilst modern Vedic astrologers place significance on the exaltation positions of the nodes, the western astrological tradition transmitted through medieval Europe demonstrates little use of them in practice traditionally and currently. Al-Biruni also points out that, in contradiction to the Greeks and Persians, the Hindu astrologers of his period disagreed upon the degree positions of the Sun, Jupiter and Saturn, and did not recognize the exaltations of the nodes - a principle he described himself as being "quite proper".

The exaltations are one of the most ancient astrological factors still in use. They are used in ancient Mesopotamian astrology from an era which pre-dates the known use of the zodiac (using reference to constellation positions which shows correspondence with those later attributed to zodiac degrees). Francesca Rochberg has pointed out that since the system is found in the tradition of Enuma Anu Enlil, its roots may extend into the second millennium BCE. Joanne Conman believes that certain decan stars the ancient Egyptians venerated in Middle Kingdom Coffin Texts appear to be the source of the "places of secret" of the later Babylonian astrological texts referenced by Rochberg and of the corresponding planetary exaltations or hypsomata of Hellenistic astrology. The coffin texts pre-date attested Babylonian astrological texts. The pattern of the honored decans matches and appears to account for the pattern of the exaltation for four of the planets.

Why the Babylonians considered these placements to be dignified is not known to Western astrologers. Although many speculations concerning the reasoning behind it have been put forth over the centuries, there are, as Robert Hand has said, still anomalies that are almost impossible to explain with any consistency, such as the exaltation of vigorous Mars in cold Capricorn. The Western sidereal astrologer, Cyril Fagan, has speculated that the planets all rose heliacally at these degrees in the year of the erection of an important temple to the Babylonian god Nabu in the year 786 BC, but this is still very speculative.

Since in Hellenistic astrology aspects were generally recognised from sign to sign, it is uncertain whether the distance of a planet from the exact degree of exaltation had much significance. However, the degree itself was used by ancient astrologers; for example, the exact degree of exaltation of each of the luminaries (the Sun and Moon) was used in the formula for the Hellenistic Lot of Exaltation.

In later Medieval astrology, influenced by the Arab and Byzantine, a hierarchy of all five essential dignities was favored, in which the most important dignity was that of the domicile ruler, followed in importance by exaltation. Medieval astrologers assigned numerical values to each dignity in the hierarchy, and these were tabulated to provide a rough statistical mode of comparison (see Essential dignity.) These weighted valuations are still in use today by astrologers.

After the discovery of the three outer planets—Uranus, Neptune, and Pluto—modern astrologers speculated on possible domicile and exaltation rulerships for these planets. It was suggested, for example, that Neptune was the "true" domicile ruler of Pisces (usurping one of Jupiter's two domicile rulerships). The ancient system was complex and symmetrical, making no allowance for additional, unseen planets, and it is difficult to include them in traditional techniques. Most modern astrologers have therefore abandoned attempts to assign exaltations to these newer planets. Notwithstanding, modern astrologers have attributed exaltation references by signs, with Uranus in Scorpio, Neptune in Aquarius, and Pluto in Leo.

Traditional Hindu Astrology, based the notion of exaltation primarily on the stellar constellations, also called Nakshatras, in which the planet fell. There are 27 Nakshatras present in the Sidereal Zodiac. Taking 360°/27 results in a precise arc of 13° 20′ per Nakshatra, remembering that 60′ constitute 1°. For example, although Jupiter is exalted in Cancer there are 3 different Nakshatras Jupiter could occupy within the 30° arc of Cancer, namely, Punarvasu (20°00′ Gemini to 3°20 Cancer), Pushya (3°20′ to 16°40′ Cancer), and Ashlesha (16°40′ to 29°59′ Cancer). Since Jupiter is exalted at 15° Cancer this placement signifies his true exaltation in Pushya Nakshatra. The Nakshatra Devata of Pushya is Bṛhaspati, the teacher of the Gods. Jupiter will not give his full exaltation effects when he is posited in a Nakshatra besides Pushya although he is still generally exalted in the sign of Cancer. Furthermore, each Nakshatra is divided into four sections, also called pāda, and when taking 13°20′/4 results in a precise arc of 3°20′ per pāda. The four pāda denote the four goals of life according to the Vedic tradition, namely, Dharma, Artha, Kāma, and Mokṣa. Although Jupiter finds strong exaltation in Pushya there are four different pāda Jupiter could occupy within the 13°20′ arc of Pushya, namely, Dharma pāda (3°20′-6°40′ Cancer), Artha pāda (6°40′-10°00′ Cancer), Kāma pāda (10°00′-13°20′ Cancer), and Mokṣa pāda (13°20′-16°40′ Cancer). Since Jupiter is exalted at 5° Cancer this signifies "deep" exaltation in the heart of the Dharma pāda of Pushya Nakshatra in the sign of Cancer which provides the astronomical reasoning of Jupiters exaltation degree. Esoterically speaking, when Jupiter is in Cancer (which signifies the heart), and is being influenced by Bṛhaspati (the teacher of the Gods), and is directed toward righteous action (Dharma pāda) Jupiter is functioning in 100% exaltation, concerning everything Jupiter represents.

== See also ==
- Astrological fall
