= Hellenistic astrology =

Ancient Greco-Roman astrology

Hellenistic astrology is a tradition of horoscopic astrology that was developed and practiced in the late Hellenistic period in and around the Mediterranean Basin region, especially in Egypt. The texts and technical terminology of this tradition of astrology were largely written in Greek (or sometimes Latin). The tradition originated sometime around the late 2nd or early 1st century BCE, and then was practiced until the 6th or 7th century CE. This type of astrology is commonly referred to as "Hellenistic astrology" because it was developed in the late Hellenistic period, although it continued to be practiced for several centuries after the end of what historians usually classify as the Hellenistic era.

== History ==
The origins of much of the astrology that would later develop in Asia, Europe and the Middle East are found among the ancient Babylonians and their system of celestial omens that began to be compiled around the middle of the 2nd millennium BCE. This system later spread either directly or indirectly through the Babylonians to other areas such as Greece where it merged with preexisting indigenous forms of astrology. (The claim that Babylonian astrology spread to China is dubious and has been challenged.) It came to Greece initially as early as the middle of the 4th century BCE, and then around the late 2nd or early 1st century BCE after the Alexandrian conquests this Babylonian astrology was mixed with the Egyptian tradition of Decanic astrology to create horoscopic astrology. This system is labeled as "horoscopic astrology" because, unlike the previous traditions, it employed the use of the ascendant, otherwise known as the horoskopos ("hour marker") in Greek, and the twelve celestial houses which are derived from it. The focus on the natal chart of the individual, as derived from the position of the planets and stars at the time of birth, represents the most significant contribution and shift of emphasis that was made during the Hellenistic tradition of astrology. This new form of astrology quickly spread across the ancient world into Europe, and the Middle East.

Additionally, some authors such as Vettius Valens and Paulus Alexandrinus took into account the Monomoiria, or individual degrees of a horoscope.

This complex system of astrology was developed to such an extent that later traditions made few fundamental changes to the core of the system, and many of the same components of horoscopic astrology that were developed during the Hellenistic period are still in use by astrologers in modern times.

== Mythical origins ==
Several Hellenistic astrologers ascribe its creation to a mythical sage named Hermes Trismegistus. Hermes is said to have written several major texts which formed the basis of the art or its evolution from the system of astrology that was inherited from the Babylonians and the Egyptians. Several authors cite Hermes as being the first to outline the houses and their meaning, and thus the houses are usually thought to date back to the very beginning of the Hellenistic tradition and indeed they are one of the major defining factors which separate Hellenistic astrology and other forms of horoscopic astrology from Babylonian astrology and other traditions in different parts of the world. This system of horoscopic astrology was then passed to another mythical figure named Asclepius to whom some of the Hermetic writings are addressed.

According to Firmicus Maternus, the system was subsequently handed down to an Egyptian pharaoh named Nechepso and his priest Petosiris. They are said to have written several major textbooks which explicated the system and it is from this text that many of the later Hellenistic astrologers draw from and cite directly. This system formed the basis of all later forms of horoscopic astrology.

== Astrology in Hellenistic Egypt ==
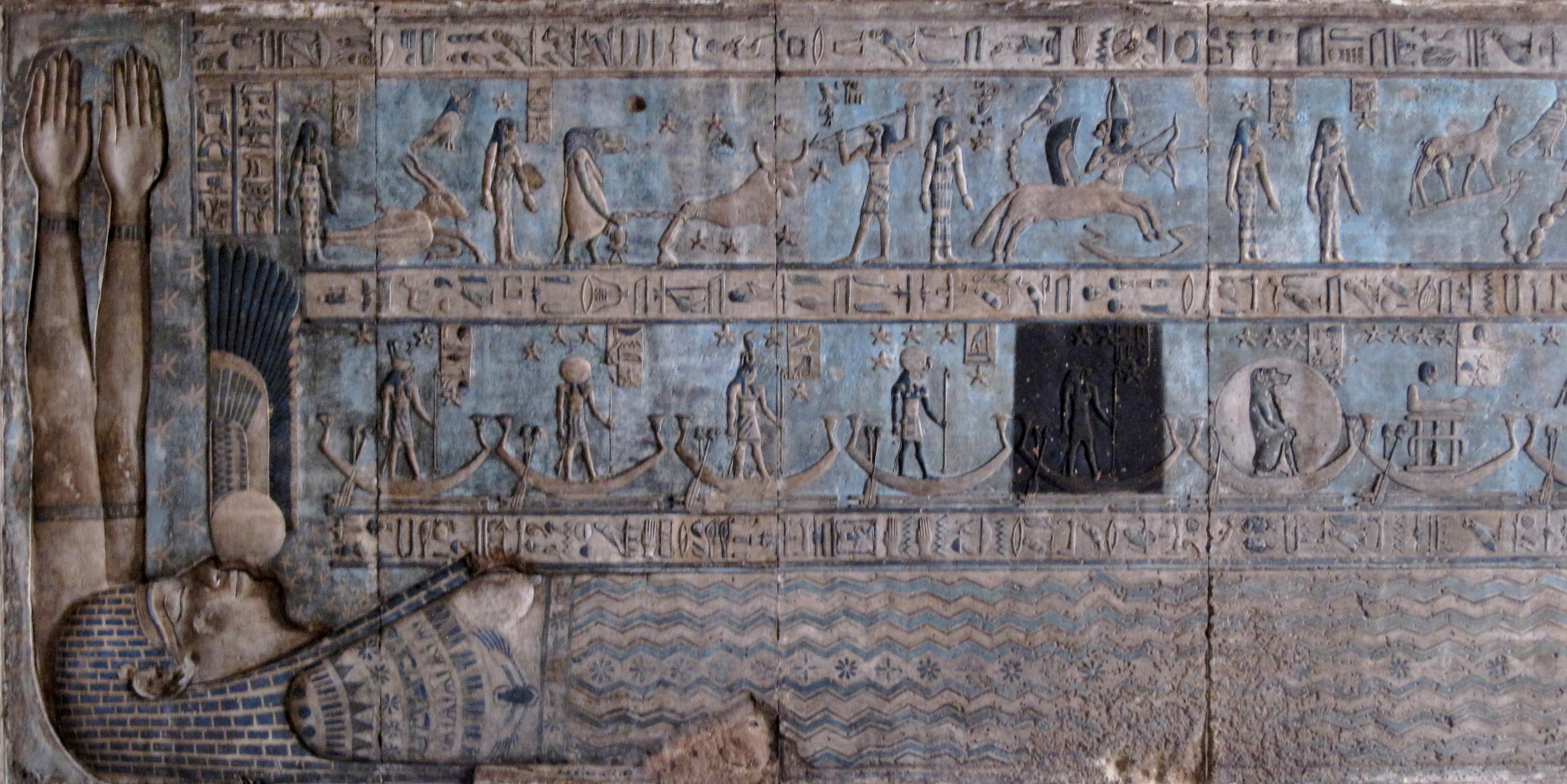
Ptolemaic Egyptian constellations at Dendera

In 525 BCE Egypt was conquered by the Persians, so there is likely to have been some Mesopotamian influence on Egyptian astrology. Arguing in favor of this, Barton gives an example of what appears to be Mesopotamian influence on the zodiac, which included two signs – the Balance and the Scorpion, as evidenced in the Dendera Zodiac (in the Greek version the Balance was known as the Scorpion's Claws).

After the occupation by Alexander the Great in 332 BCE, Egypt came under Greek rule and influence. The city of Alexandria was founded by Alexander after the conquest and during the 3rd and 2nd centuries BCE, the scholars of Alexandria were prolific writers. It was in 'Alexandrian Egypt' that Babylonian astrology was mixed with the Egyptian tradition of Decanic astrology to create Horoscopic astrology. This contained the Babylonian zodiac with its system of planetary exaltations, the triplicities of the signs and the importance of eclipses. Along with this it incorporated the Egyptian concept of dividing the zodiac into 36 decans of ten degrees each, with an emphasis on the rising decan, the Greek system of planetary gods, sign rulership, and the four elements.

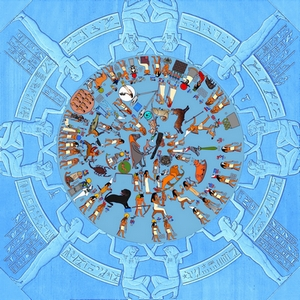
Dendera zodiac with original colors (reconstructed)

The decans were a system of time measurement according to the constellations. They were led by the constellation Sothis or Sirius. The risings of the decans in the night were used to divide the night into 'hours'. The rising of a constellation just before sunrise (its heliacal rising) was considered the last hour of the night. Over the course of the year, each constellation rose just before sunrise for ten days. When they became part of the astrology of the Hellenistic Age, each decan was associated with ten degrees of the zodiac. Texts from the 2nd century BCE list predictions relating to the positions of planets in zodiac signs at the time of the rising of certain decans, particularly Sothis.

Particularly important in the development of horoscopic astrology was the astrologer and astronomer Ptolemy, who lived in Alexandria in Egypt. Ptolemy's work the Tetrabiblos laid the basis of the Western astrological tradition. The earliest Zodiac found in Egypt dates to the 1st century BCE, the Dendera Zodiac.

According to Firmicus Maternus (4th century), the system of horoscopic astrology was given early on to an Egyptian pharaoh named Nechepso and his priest Petosiris. The Hermetic texts were also put together during this period and Clement of Alexandria, writing in the Roman era, demonstrates the degree to which astrologers were expected to have knowledge of the texts in his description of Egyptian sacred rites:

This is principally shown by their sacred ceremonial. For first advances the Singer, bearing some one of the symbols of music. For they say that he must learn two of the books of Hermes, the one of which contains the hymns of the gods, the second the regulations for the king's life. And after the Singer advances the Astrologer, with a horologe in his hand, and a palm, the symbols of astrology. He must have the astrological books of Hermes, which are four in number, always in his mouth.

The Thema Mundi as exposed by Macrobius

== Astrology in Greece ==
The conquest of Asia by Alexander the Great exposed the Greeks to the cultures and cosmological ideas of Syria, Babylon, Persia and central Asia. Greek overtook cuneiform script as the international language of intellectual communication and part of this process was the transmission of astrology from Cuneiform to Greek. Sometime around 280 BCE, Berossus, a priest of Bel from Babylon, moved to the Greek island of Kos in order to teach astrology and Babylonian culture to the Greeks. With this, what Campion calls, 'the innovative energy' in astrology moved west to the Hellenistic world of Greece and Egypt. According to Campion, the astrology that arrived from the East was marked by its complexity, with different forms of astrology emerging. By the 1st century BCE two varieties of astrology were in existence, one that required the reading of horoscopes in order to establish precise details about the past, present and future, the other being theurgic, meaning literally 'god-work', and emphasised the soul's ascent to the stars. While they were not mutually exclusive, the former sought information about the life, while the latter was concerned with personal transformation, where astrology served as a form of dialogue with the divine.

== Astrology in Rome ==
Like so much else, astrology came to Rome due to Greek influence. Among the Greeks and Romans, Babylonia or Chaldea was so identified with astrology that "Chaldaean wisdom" became the synonym of divination through the planets and stars. Astrologers became very much in vogue in Imperial Rome. Indeed, the emperor Tiberius had had his destiny predicted for him at birth, and so surrounded himself with astrologers such as Thrasyllus of Mendes. According to Ammianus Marcellinus there are people who "neither appear in public nor eat nor eat a meal nor think they can with due caution take a bath, until they have critically examined the calendar (ephemeris)". Claudius, on the other hand favored augury and banned astrologers from Rome altogether. It is perhaps not surprising, that in the course of time, to be known as a "Chaldaean" carried with it frequently the suspicion of charlatanry and of more or less willful deception. One of the more famous examples of Roman literature concerning astrology is the poem Astronomica, written in the first century CE by Marcus Manilius.

== Transmission ==
Hellenistic astrology was practiced from the 2nd century BCE until around the 7th century CE when Europe entered the Middle Ages. Astrology was then passed to and further developed by individuals working within the Islamic Empire from the 7th to the 13th century.

== See also ==
- Babylonian astrology
- Critodemus
- Dorotheus of Sidon
- Epigenes of Byzantium
- Hephaistio of Thebes
- Julius Firmicus Maternus
- Marcus Manilius
- Paulus Alexandrinus
- Ptolemy
- Petosiris to Nechepo
- Rhetorius
- Tetrabiblos
- Vettius Valens
- Worship of heavenly bodies

== Sources ==
- Ammianus Marcellinus, Res gestae, 384–385 CE. Translated by John C. Rolfe in Ammianus Marcellinus with an English Translation, Harvard University Press, 1935–1940.
- Barton, Tamsyn, 1994. Ancient Astrology. Routledge. ISBN 0-415-11029-7.
- Campion, Nicholas, 2008. The Dawn of Astrology: A Cultural History of Western Astrology - The Ancient and Classical Worlds. Continuum. ISBN 978-1-84725-214-2.
- Maternus, Julius Firmicus, 4th century. Matheseos libri VIII . Translated by Jean Rhys Bram in Ancient astrology theory and practice, Noyes Press, 1975. Reprinted by Astrology Center of America, 2005. ISBN 978-1-933303-10-9.
- Holden, James Herschel, 1996. A history of horoscopic astrology. American Federation of Astrologers, Inc. ISBN 978-0-86690-463-6.
- Parker, Derek and Julia, 1983. A history of astrology. Deutsch. ISBN 978-0-233-97576-4.
- Pingree, David Edwin, 1997. From astral omens to astrology: from Babylon to Bīnāker. Istituto italiano per l'Africa et l'Oriente (Serie orientale Roma).
- Roberts, Reverend Alexander (translator) 1906. The Ante-Nicene Fathers: The Writings of the Fathers Down to A.D. 325 Volume II - Fathers of the Second Century - Hermas, Tatian, Theophilus, Athenagoras, Clement of Alexandria. W. B. Eerdmans Pub. Co. Republished: Cosimo, Inc., 2007. ISBN 978-1-60206-471-3).
