= Pectoral (Ancient Egypt) =

Breast ornament worn in Ancient Egypt

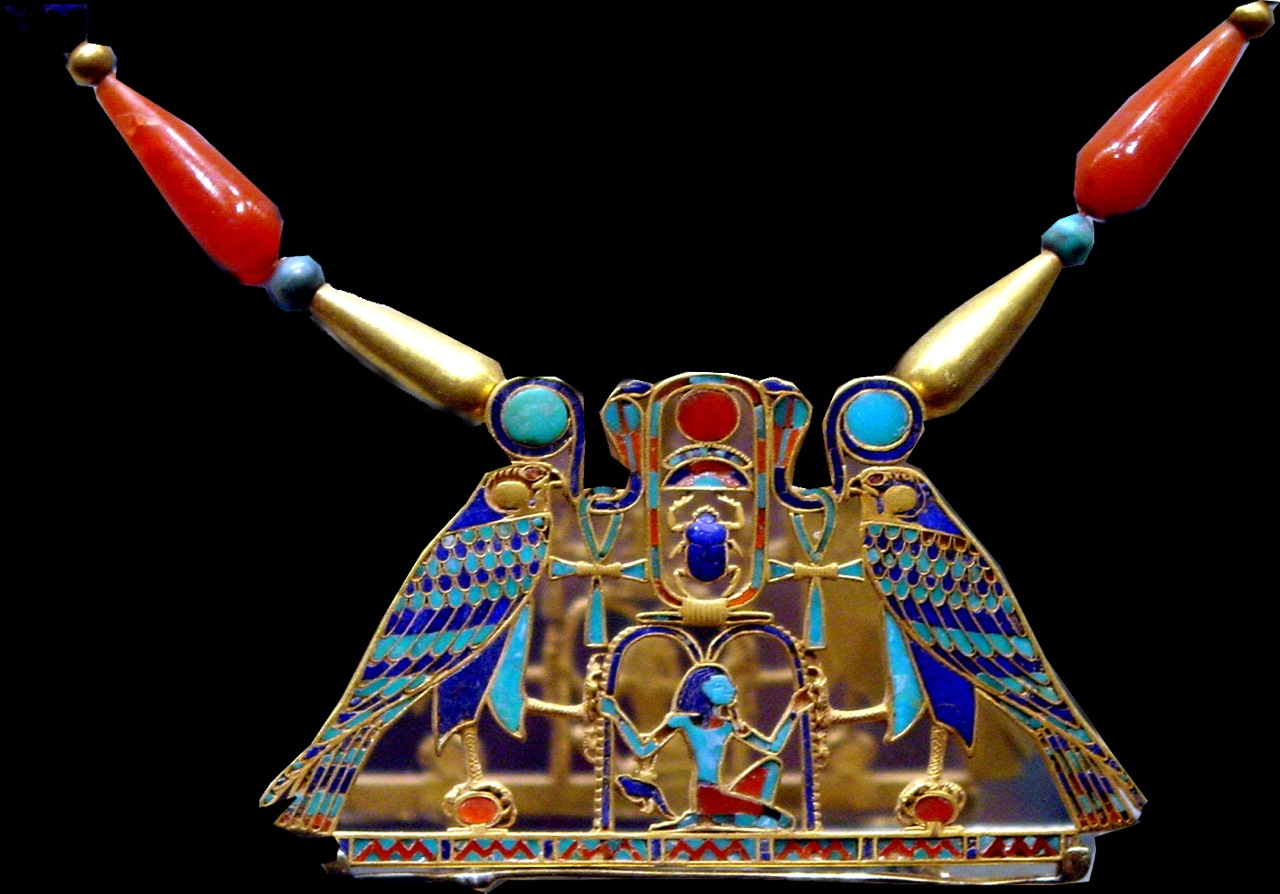
Sithathoriunet's pectoral bearing Senusret II's praenomen, c. 1878 BC. Hieroglyphs: ankh, Heh, tadpole, shen ring, scarab, Ra, water ripple, rising sun, uraeus

The pectorals of ancient Egypt were a form of jewelry, often in the form of a brooch. They are often also amulets, and may be so described. They were mostly worn by richer people and the pharaoh.

One type is attached with a nah necklace, suspended from the neck and lying on the breast. Statuary from the Old Kingdom onwards shows this form.

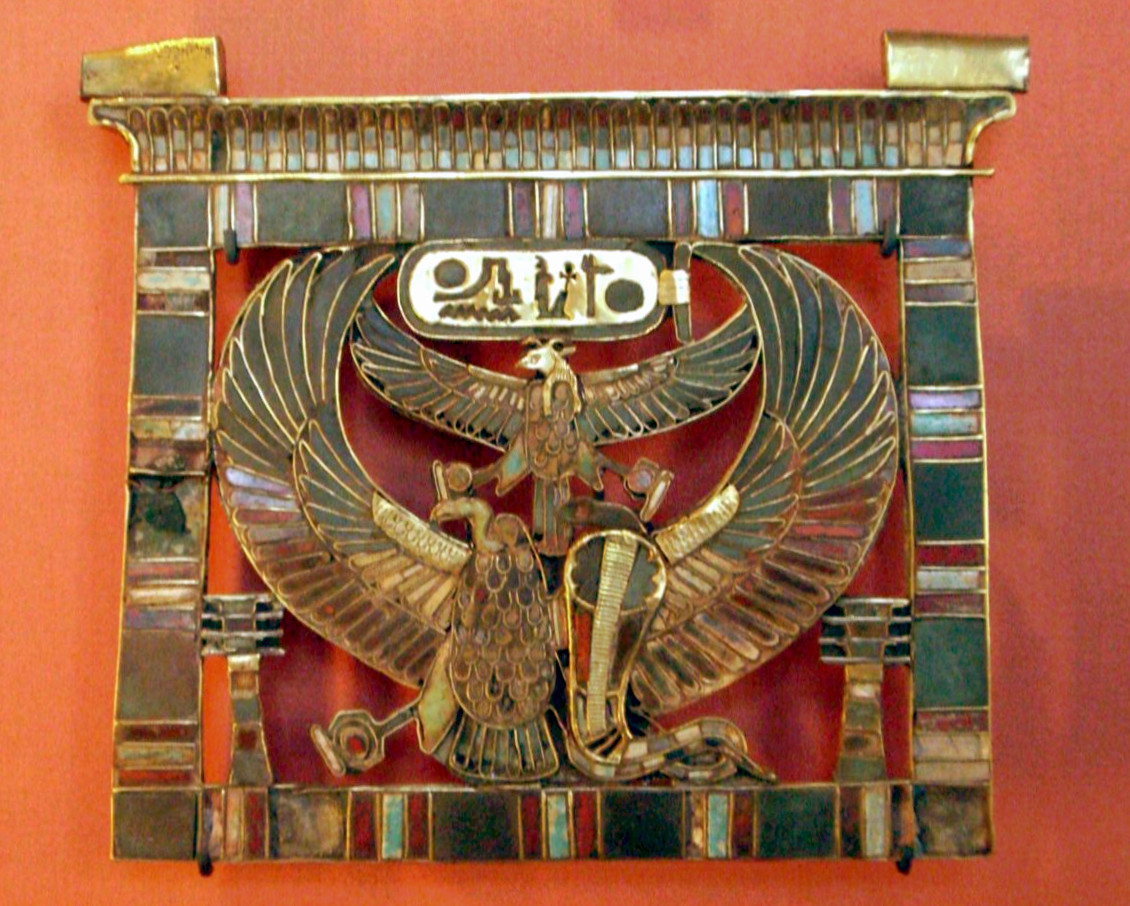
Brooch pectoral, with hieroglyphs: uraeus, mut, Djed pillar, shen ring, naos (shrine) cartouche: adze, was scepter, sun disk, Maat hieroglyph, N-water ripple (n hieroglyph)

A later form was attached as a brooch, with the thematic, iconographic function and statement outweighing its actual use as a piece of jewellery for adornment. The thematic statements were typically about the pharaoh or statements of ancient Egyptian mythology and culture. They are usually of gold with cloisonné inlays of gemstones.

Pectoral varies in size, from a simple motif suspended from the sternum to the size of a breastplate. It is made of precious metal, fabric, bone, or any other material.

== Bijou (jewellery) ==
This object appears from ancient times, in ancient Egypt as well as among the Hebrews. It is also found in many civilizations of the Mediterranean basin, Asia, pre-Columbian North and South America, and among indigenous peoples. It originates from a need for magical protection.

== History ==
=== Ancient Egypt ===
The Egyptian pectoral model comes in two forms. It can appear as a rigid or articulated necklace, suspended by a chain around the neck and descending to mid-chest, or even covering it. It can also take the form of a large brooch attached by a pin to the neck or sternum.

== Ancient Egyptian definition of pectoral ==
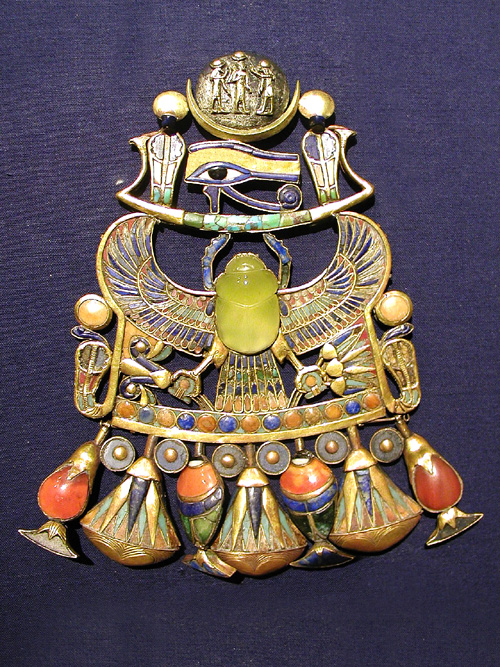
Amulet pendant from the tomb of Tutankhamun, with wadjet

The many determinatives for pectoral are not portrayed in the Gardiner's Sign List. However, one of the 10 words for 'pectoral', or 'collar' uses the Usekh collar determinative, S11, the "collar necklace" S11. However a similar hieroglyph for the verb "to collar", "to net" shows the relationship between the two Gardiner-listed hieroglyphs T24.

The basic definition of a brooch is as a wide piece of jewellery. Therefore, one form of the 'pectoral' word listings uses the word for "breadth, broad", "to be wide or spacious", the Egyptian word usekh. (Cf. Usekh collar.)

=== Pectoral determinatives ===
Though Gardiner lists only the "broad collar", S11, the following listing of words for "pectoral" shows the other types of pectoral jewellery forms that have a Gardiner-unlisted type of pectoral hieroglyph sign:

The list of Gardiner-unlisted determinatives for pectoral:

ari aui-(none) (bracelets, armlets)
usekh-(Gard-unl. 1 to 7) (8 is the S11 collar)
utcha-(Gard-unl. 9 to 12) (12 has beads)
babaa-{Gard-unl. 13) ('necklace of beads', pectoral)
beb-{Gard-unl. 13) (a metal pectoral or breastplate, collar) (uraeus headdress (?))
menqebit-(none) (collar or pectoral to which the serpent amulet was attached)
hebner-{Gard-unl. 2 (similar to collar S11)) (collar, pectoral, neckband)
heter-t-(none) (a pectoral, a pectoral amulet)

hkakerit-(Gard. Aa30-used horizontally)Aa30(ornaments, collar, pectoral, head-attire)
sheb-{Gard-unl. 15) (collar, necklace, pectoral)

'None' may have an alternate determinative used to define the word. From the above definitions, it can be seen that the collar, neckband, pectoral, beads, etc., can also include amulets inclusive into the pectoral's iconography. The above listed words are refenced in E. A. Wallis Budge's "dictionary" to 200 works: steles, papyri, Egyptian literature, personal literature, etc., or the approximate 120 authors referenced.

== Statuary with pectorals ==
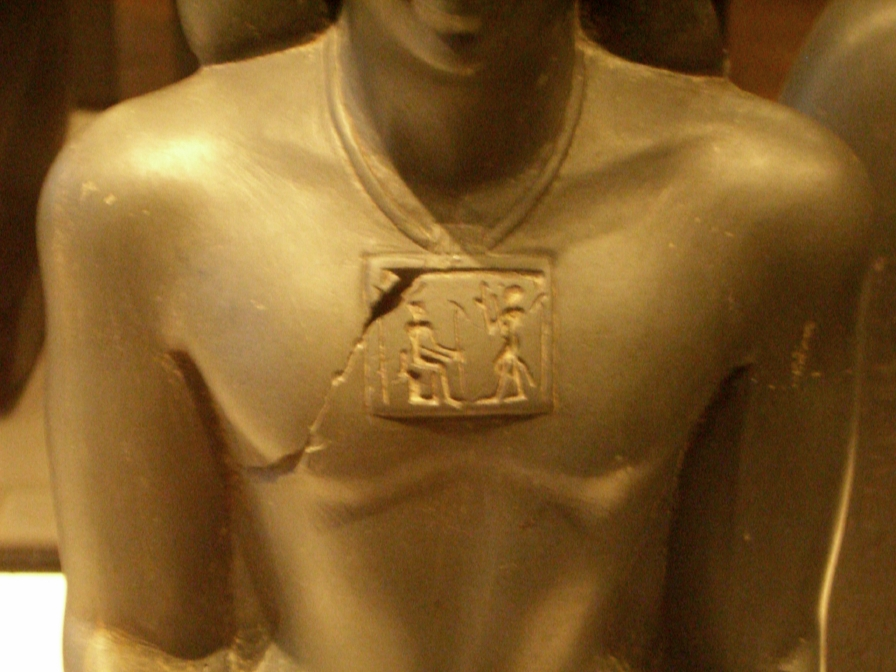
Louvre statue with pectoral

Standing statues, or others were sometimes represented with various forms of jewellery, including pectorals; some are enigmatic in what is being portrayed, whether to gods, or what the symbolism represents.

== Famous pectorals; hieroglyph statements ==
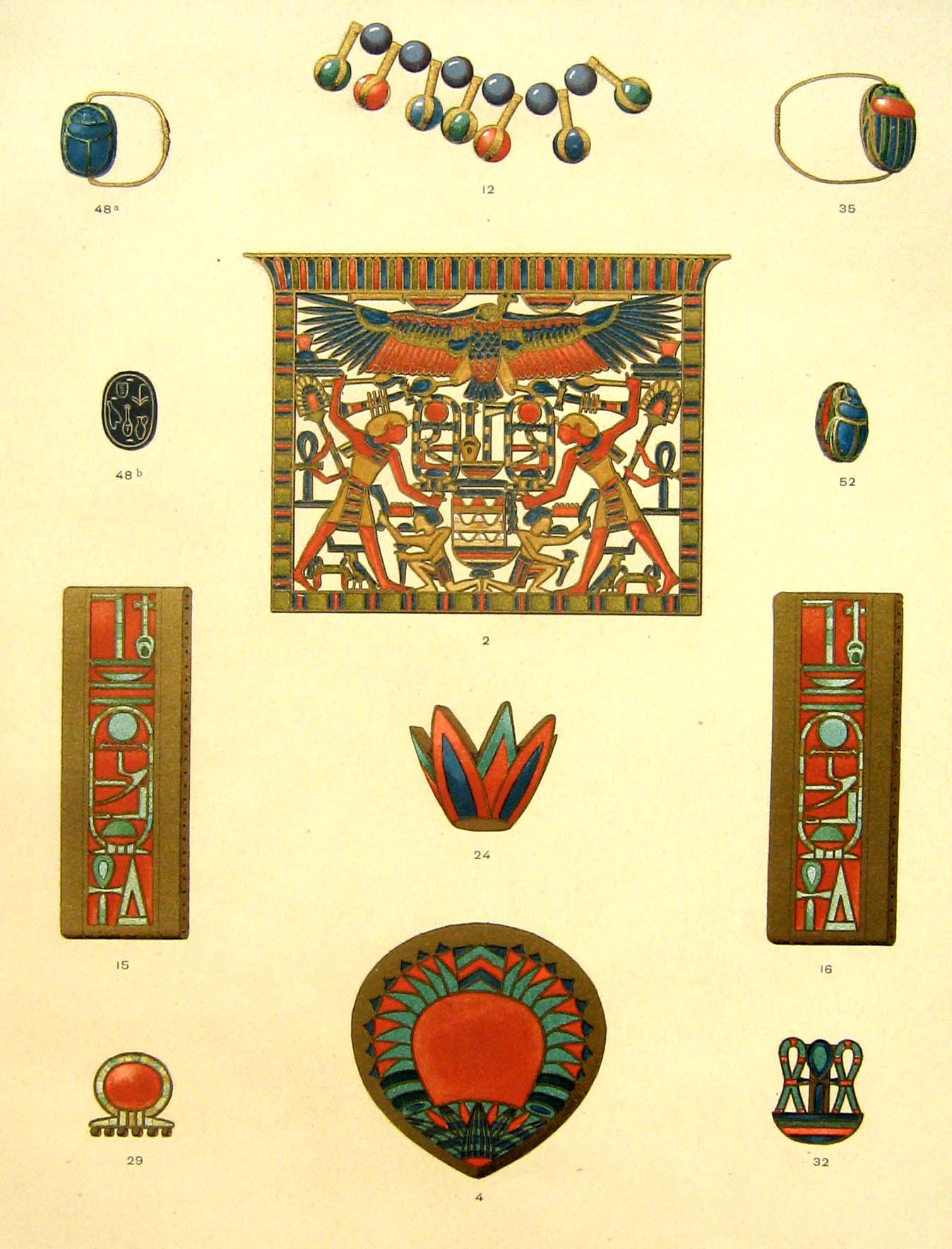
Jewellery including the Pectoral of Amenemhat III

Statements in Egyptian language hieroglyphs were often the theme of famous pectorals, regardless of their actual use for adornment.

One famous complex pectoral for Amenemhat III has a statement of his rulership. The Pectoral of Amenemhat III states the following:

Lord (of) Heaven, God-Good, Lord of the Two Lands, 'Ny-Maat-Ra', Lord (of all) Lands.
pt-nb, ntr-nft, nb-tawy, n-maat-a-t-Ra, nb-hastw. ('Ny-Maat-Ra' is Amenemhat III's prenomen name.)

Kamrin's modern hieroglyph primer for Egyptian artifacts uses Amenemhat III's pectoral for Exercise 22, Object 3. The discussion explains that the extended wings of the Vulture Goddess relate to "Lord of the Sky"-(pt), the Vulture Goddess, (but also implying the pharaoh is Lord of the Sky). Her translation: "Lord (Lady) of the sky Nimaatre (Amenemhat III), the good god, lord of the Two Lands and of all foreign Lands." (nb pt n-m3't-r' nthr nfr nb t3wy h3swt nb(w)t)

== "Pectorals as a brooch" gallery ==
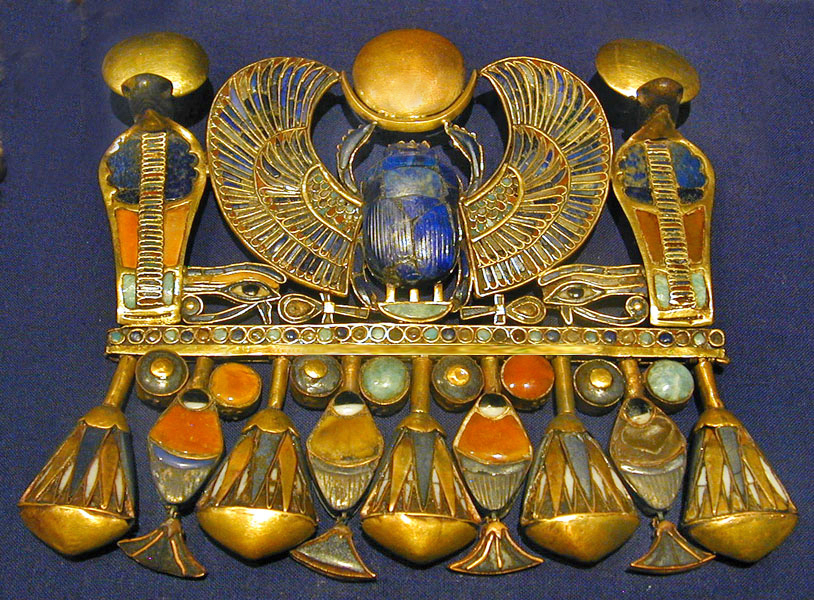
hieroglyphs: ankh, basket, Eye of Horus, Sun Disk-(Gard. N5)

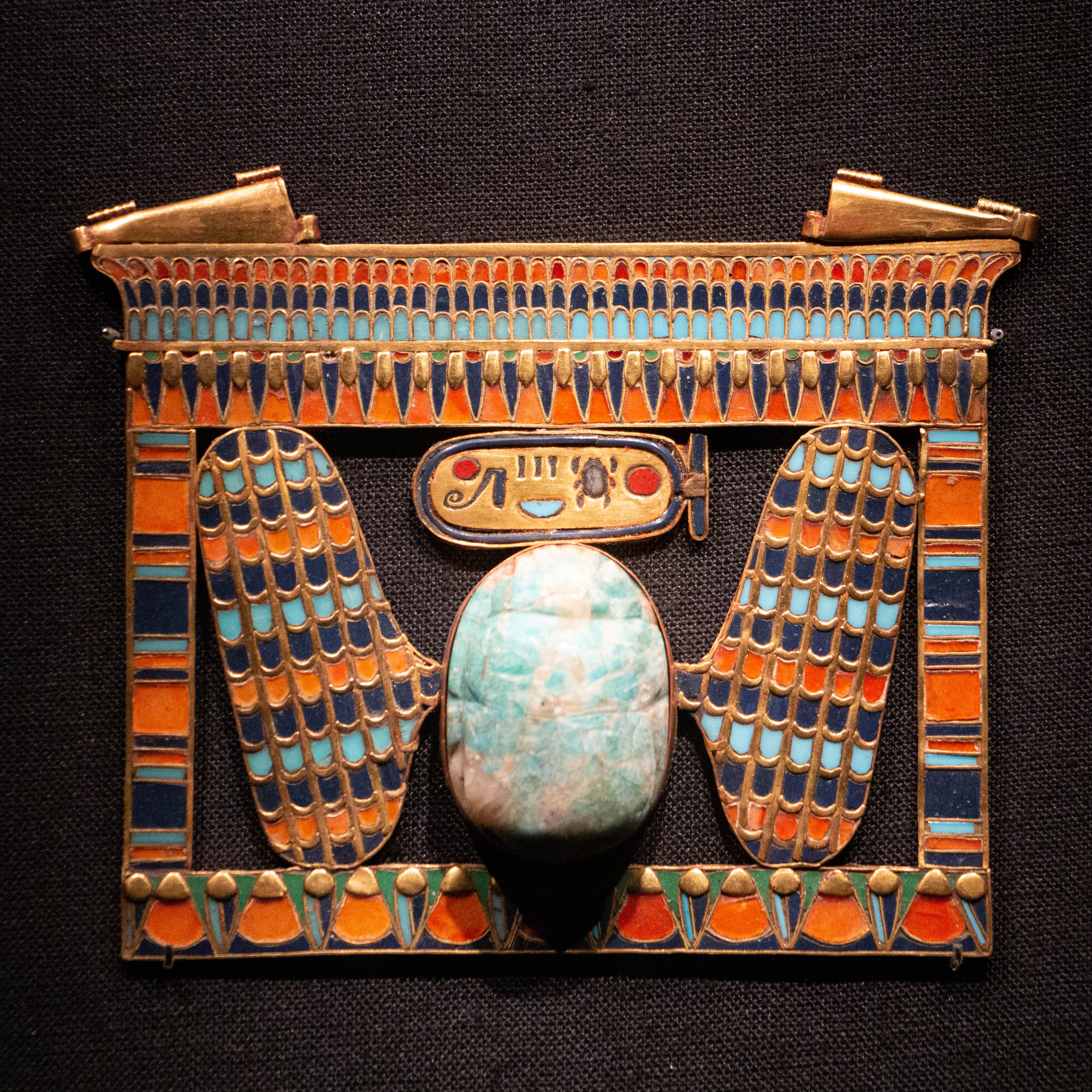
Heart scarab pectoral of Tutankhamun

== "Pectorals as necklace" gallery ==
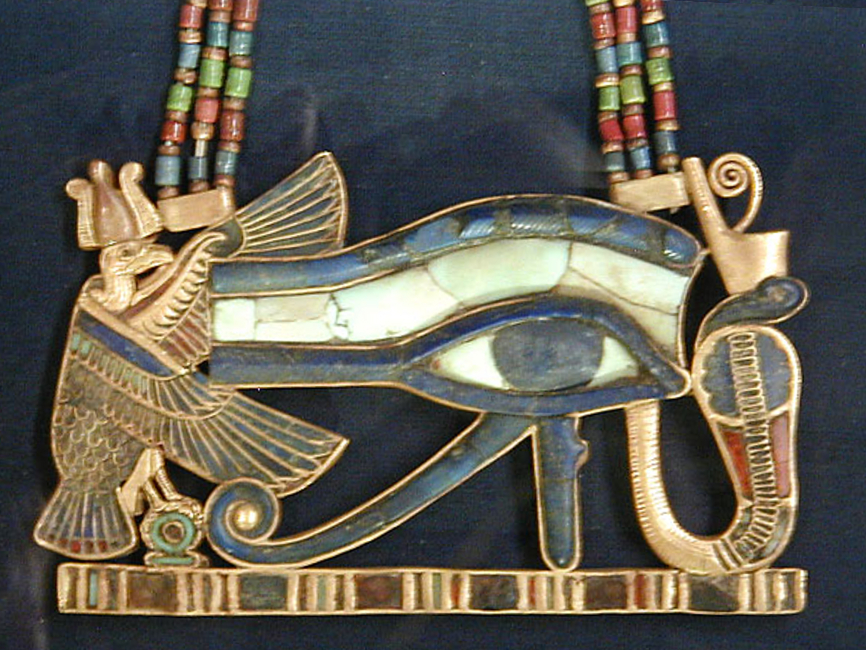
Eye of Horus pectoral.
hieroglyphs: Red crown, White crown, Shen ring, uraeus, mut vulture, Eye of Horus

== See also ==
- Gardiner's Sign List#S. Crowns, Dress, Staves, etc.
- Gardiner's Sign List
- List of ancient Egyptian statuary with amulet necklaces, (section Pectoral Necklace)
- Gorget
