= Teucer of Babylon =

Greco-Egyptian astrologer, probably of the 1st century

Teucer of Babylon (Ancient Greek: Τεῦκρος ὁ Βαβυλώνιος), also known as Teukros of Babylon, was a Greek-Egyptian Hellenistic astrologer of uncertain date, probably active in or before the first century AD. His name was transmitted in Middle Persian and Arabic in forms including Tinkalūshā, Tinkalūs, Tankalūshā, and, in Persian, Tanglūshā (Persian: تنگلوشا).

He is chiefly known for his treatment of the paranatellonta, the constellations or asterisms that rise together with particular degrees or divisions of the zodiac. His writings became an important source for later Greek, Middle Persian and Arabic astrology.

== Identity and date ==
Teucer was most probably of Greek descent and lived in Roman Egypt. The “Babylon” attached to his name is generally identified not with the Mesopotamian city of Babylon, but with Babylon Fortress in Egypt, near modern Cairo.

The date of Teucer is reconstructed from references to, and possible borrowings from, his work. David Pingree concluded that he was used as a source by Vettius Valens and Rhetorius, which would place him in or before the first century AD. Wolfgang Hübner has argued that some of his material was already used by Marcus Manilius and Julius Firmicus Maternus; if the proposed relationship with Manilius is accepted, at least some of the material attributed to Teucer would date to the first century BC. Teucer is also mentioned by the philosopher Porphyry, establishing that he lived before the third century AD.

== Astrological doctrines ==
Teucer combined divisions of the zodiac with geography, melothesia—the correspondence of zodiacal signs with parts of the human body—and numerous constellations or asterisms outside the zodiac. He is especially important for the history of the paranatellonta (Ancient Greek: παρανατέλλοντα), celestial figures believed to rise simultaneously with specified zodiacal degrees.

The system attributed to him included many figures that were not among the conventional 48 constellations associated with Ptolemy. In one of the surviving arrangements, the zodiac was divided into small sectors, usually of two or five degrees, greatly increasing the number of extrazodiacal figures associated with the signs. Approximately 140 such figures were connected with the degrees of the zodiac.

Teucer's paranatellonta influenced or were preserved by later astrologers, including Vettius Valens, Rhetorius and Byzantine writers. Elements of the system also passed through Middle Persian into Arabic astrology and appear in the works of Abu Ma'shar al-Balkhi.

== Surviving fragments ==
No complete work by Teucer survives. Fragments attributed to him are preserved in three principal textual groupings:

1. The paranatellonta of the 36 decans, edited by Franz Boll in Sphaera (1903), pp. 16–21, and in the Catalogus Codicum Astrologorum Graecorum, vol. VII (1908), pp. 156–214. The section from 18° Aquarius to 30° Pisces was critically edited by Wolfgang Hübner in Grade und Gradbezirke der Tierkreiszeichen (1995), vol. I, pp. 126–127, with commentary in vol. II, pp. 94–103.
2. The paranatellonta of particular zodiacal degrees, containing traces of hexametrical composition, edited by Boll in Sphaera, pp. 41–52. The surviving material extends from 1° Aries to 18° Aquarius and was critically edited by Hübner, vol. I, pp. 108–127, with commentary in vol. II, pp. 1–93.
3. A second collection of decanal paranatellonta, edited by Stefan Weinstock in the Catalogus Codicum Astrologorum Graecorum, vol. IX, part 2 (1953), pp. 180–186. This arrangement considered the 36 decans in relation to the seven traditional planets and may originally have contained 252 sections.

Reflections of these texts also occur in Rhetorius, in a twelfth-century Byzantine astrological poem by John Kamateros, in the Oxford manuscripts conventionally called the Excerpta Barocciana, and in Abu Ma'shar's Great Introduction to Astrology.

== Transmission through Middle Persian and Arabic ==
Teucer's work was translated or adapted into Middle Persian, probably during the Sasanian period, and was subsequently translated from Middle Persian into Arabic. In Arabic and Persian sources the author's name appears in several forms, including Tinkalūshā, Tinkalūs, Tanglūshā and Ṭīnfarūs. These variants have been explained as products of the transmission of the Greek name through the ambiguous Pahlavi script.

In the Islamic bibliographical tradition, a work attributed to Tinkalūshā was known as the Kitāb al-wujūh wa-l-ḥudūd (“Book of the Faces and Bounds”). The “faces” in this title refer to the three ten-degree divisions of each zodiacal sign, usually called decans, while the “bounds” were another system for dividing the signs among the planets.

The Middle Persian version appears to have been an adaptation rather than a strictly literal translation. The transmitted material incorporated Iranian names and doctrines alongside Greek and Indian systems. Traces of this Iranian recension survive in the first chapter of the sixth book of Abu Ma'shar's Great Introduction. Abu Ma'shar describes the figures associated with the decans according to Greek, Indian and Persian authorities; much of the Persian material is attributed to Tinkalūshā, and some of the figures retain Persian names.

The original Arabic translation made from Middle Persian appears to be lost, although substantial extracts survived through Abu Ma'shar and other authors. A work entitled Ṣuwar al-daraj wa-l-ḥukm ʿalayhā fīmā tadullu ʿalayhi min ṭawāliʿ al-mawlūdīn, attributed to Tinkalūshā and supposedly translated by Ibn Wahshiyya, has also circulated in Arabic manuscripts. Carlo Alfonso Nallino concluded that this text was a later forgery unrelated to the authentic work of Teucer.

== Persian name and literary reception ==
In Persian lexicography, Teucer's transmitted name became Tanglūshā (Persian: تنگلوشا), with related forms such as Tanglūsh and Tinkalūs. Later Persian dictionaries misunderstood the name as a compound consisting of tang, interpreted as a painted book or folio, and Lūshā, supposedly the name of a Roman painter or sage.

This folk etymology generated a legend in which Lūshā was portrayed as a master painter and a counterpart of Mani. His illustrated book, the Tanglūshā, was consequently compared with Mani's celebrated painted book, the Arzhang. Modern scholarship identifies this tradition as a secondary misunderstanding of the transmitted name of Teucer, rather than evidence for a separate painter named Lūshā.

Because Teucer's astrological work contained numerous descriptions of celestial figures, the name Tanglūshā eventually became associated in Persian literature with richly illustrated books and collections of marvelous images. The Persian poets Khaqani and Nizami Ganjavi both referred to the Tanglūshā in this sense. Khaqani compared his own compositions with both the Chinese Arzhang and the Tanglūshā, while Nizami described it as a book of “a hundred thousand images”.

This literary reception illustrates how the name of a technical astrological text was gradually detached from its original author and reinterpreted in Persian culture as the title of a legendary book of pictures.

== Bibliography ==
- Boll, Franz. Sphaera: Neue griechische Texte und Untersuchungen zur Geschichte der Sternbilder. Leipzig: Teubner, 1903.
- Blažeković, Zdravko. Music in Medieval and Renaissance Astrological Imagery. PhD dissertation, Graduate Center, City University of New York, 1997.
- Hübner, Wolfgang. Grade und Gradbezirke der Tierkreiszeichen. 2 vols. Stuttgart: Teubner, 1995.
- Hübner, Wolfgang. “Teukros im Spätmittelalter”. International Journal of the Classical Tradition 1, no. 2 (1994): 45–57.
- Hübner, Wolfgang. Manilius, Astronomica Buch V. Berlin: De Gruyter, 2010.
- Pingree, David. The Yavanajātaka of Sphujidhvaja. Vol. II. Harvard University Press, 1978, pp. 442–443.
- Rochberg, Francesca. “Teukros of Egyptian Babylon”. In The Encyclopedia of Ancient Natural Scientists, edited by Paul T. Keyser and Georgia L. Irby-Massie. Routledge, 2008, p. 778.
- Taqizadeh, Seyyed Hasan. Gāh-shomārī dar Īrān-e qadīm [Chronology in Ancient Iran], pp. 317–319.

== See also ==
- Hellenistic astrology
- Astrology in Hellenistic Egypt
- Decan (astrology)
- Paranatellonta
- Abu Ma'shar al-Balkhi
- Middle Persian literature
- History of astrology
