= Paulus Alexandrinus =

Ancient astrologer

Paulus Alexandrinus was an astrological author from the late Roman Empire. His extant work, Eisagogika, or Introductory Matters (or Introduction), which was written in 378 AD, is a treatment of major topics in astrology as practiced in the fourth-century Roman Empire.

== Biography ==
Little is known about Paulus' life. He lived in Alexandria, one of the most scholarly cities of the Roman world, where astrology was also at its most sophisticated. In his lifetime, Rome's power was declining and the capital of the Roman Empire had been moved to Constantinople. We know he was regarded as a considerable authority because we have the record of a series of lectures given on his work by the respected Neo-Platonist philosopher Olympiodorus some two centuries later (in 564 AD), in Alexandria. These lectures were preserved in a Commentary and both Paulus' Introduction and Olympiodorus' Commentary have been translated together, giving a view of the development of astrological technique and contemporary attitudes towards astrology from the tumultuous late Empire through the even more unstable early Byzantine Empire.

The Introduction may be most interesting for its discussion of the eleven phases of the Moon, because it gives us a clear treatment of a topic whose influence on Greek astrological speculation has likely been much underestimated The Moon's phases are probably the single most influential factor in katarchic charts of the Hellenistic period, going back beyond Dorotheus of Sidon. Also very important in the Introduction are the Lots, which were at the core of Hellenistic astrological technique, although the scientifically minded Ptolemy avoids them. Paulus also discusses dodekatemoria and monomoiria, and gives an extensive treatment of sect in astrological analysis, and of the influence of planetary aspects as they apply and separate (the Hellenistic understanding of which is considerably at odds with modern practice.)

At the time Paulus wrote, there was notable intellectual consolidation taking place in astrology. Forty years earlier, Julius Firmicus Maternus had written Mathesis, a long and very detailed summary of the astrological technique of his time, which has come down to us intact. Contemporaneous with Paulus, an anonymous writer had produced a Treatise on the Fixed Stars in 379 AD, which is our best record of how practical astrologers of the Roman period after Ptolemy dealt with stars in the context of the astrological chart; a few decades later came three books (Apotelesmatika) by the Egyptian Hephaistio of Thebes (415 AD) integrating Ptolemy with earlier traditions.

== Legacy ==
In the several hundred years following Paulus and Hephaistio, there continued to be an active astrological tradition, some works of which have come down to us, including writings by Julian of Laodicea (c. 500 AD), Rhetorius (6th or 7th century), and, in the 5th or 6th century, Centiloquy (spuriously attributed for many centuries to Ptolemy), which exerted a very considerable influence on the astrological thinking of the Arabs and on European astrologers of the Medieval and Early Modern periods. (See: Lilly.)

An important Indian astrological treatise called the Paulisa Siddhanta ("Doctrine of Paulus") is sometimes thought to be derived from the work of Paulus. However, this notion has been rejected by other scholars in the field, notably by David Pingree who stated that "...the identification of Paulus Alexandrinus with the author of the Paulisasiddhanta is totally false".

== Works ==
- Elementa apotelesmatica (ed. by E. Boer), Teubner, Leipzig, 1958.

=== Translations ===
- Paulus Alexandrinus, Introductory Matters, trans. Robert Schmidt, ed. Robert Hand, The Golden Hind Press, Berkeley Springs, WV, second edition, revised, 1993.
- Late Classical Astrology: Paulus Alexandrinus and Olympiodorus, with the Scholia from Later Commentators, trans. Dorian Giesler Greenbaum, ed. Robert Hand, ARHAT Publications, Reston, VA, 2001.
