= Teucer (disambiguation) =

Teucer is a legendary character in the Homeric tradition. The name may be:

- Teucer, the bowman, half-brother of Ajax
- King Teucer, founder of Dardania
- Teucer of Babylon, an astrologer of Egyptian Babylon
- 2797 Teucer, an asteroid
- Caligo teucer, a species of butterfly
