= Antiochus of Athens =

Ancient Greek astrologer

Antiochus of Athens (Ancient Greek: Ἀντίοχος ὁ Ἀθηναῖος) was an influential Hellenistic astrologer who flourished sometime between the late 1st and mid 2nd century AD. There is some disagreement as to when he lived and wrote. Franz Cumont and others have argued that he lived as early as the 1st century BC, while David Pingree placed him as late as the end of the 2nd century AD. The one agreed datum is that Antiochus is referenced by Porphyry (234-c. 305 AD), and so Antiochus must have lived before the death of Porphyry.

All the writings of Antiochus are now lost, but substantial fragments and extracts remain. The works ascribed to him are a Thesaurus (Treasuries), an Introduction (Eisagogika) to astrology, and also an astrological calendar, On the risings and settings of the stars in the 12 months of the year. Antiochus is extensively quoted or paraphrased by later writers, particularly the Neoplatonist Porphyry, and Rhetorius of Egypt. There is also a later Byzantine epitome, or summary, of his work. A parapegma or calendar of star risings and settings and weather changes is also extant.

Antiochus was influential upon later astrologers. Parts of his text were used as the basis for Porphyry's third-century Introduction to the Tetrabiblos of Ptolemy, as well as being quoted by Hephaistio of Thebes (380 AD), Anonymous of 379 AD (Treatise on Fixed Stars) and Julius Firmicus Maternus (c. 336 AD).

Porphyry relies heavily on Antiochus for definitions of technical terms used by Ptolemy in Tetrabiblos. Antiochus made one of the earliest references to astrological reception, and discussed the twelves houses (topoi) of the astrological chart, heliacal risings and settings, and the Lots.
