= Monomoiria =

Treatise on Hellenistic astrology

The Monomoiria are the 360 individual degrees of the sky in Hellenistic astrology. They were each associated with particular planets, especially in traditions that influenced and were influenced by Paulus Alexandrinus's Eisagogika and Vettius Valens's Anthology.
