= Hephaestion of Thebes =

Ancient Egyptian astrologer

Hephaestion, Hephaistion, or Hephaistio of Thebes (Ancient Greek: Ἡφαιστίων ὁ Θηβαῖος, Hēphaistíōn ho Thēbaĩos) was a Hellenized Egyptian astrologer of late Antiquity (born AD 380) who wrote a Greek treatise known as the Apotelesmatics or Apotelesmatika around AD 415. Much of the work appears to be an attempt to synthesize the earlier works of the 1st century astrologer Dorotheus of Sidon and the 2nd century astrologer Claudius Ptolemy. Hephaestion is seen mainly as one of the later compilers of the Hellenistic tradition of astrology since he mainly draws from earlier astrologers, including Antiochus of Athens, and he summarizes large portions of Ptolemy and Dorotheus, which is helpful to modern scholars since we have no other record of many of the authorities that he quotes.

Hephaestion's intention appears to have been to reconcile the authoritative Ptolemaic tradition with the earlier practices represented by Dorotheus of Sidon. He wrote at a time and in a place (possibly Alexandria) when astrological ideas were being summarized and consolidated, after the removal of the capital of the Empire from Rome to Constantinople. His contemporaries included Paulus Alexandrinus (378 AD) and the anonymous author of the well-known Treatise on Fixed Stars (379 AD).

Although influential on later Byzantine astrologers, his work seems to have had little impact in the Arab tradition which followed. The first two volumes of the Apotelesmatics have been translated into English (by Robert Schmidt of Project Hindsight) and the third volume on Katarchic astrology (e.g., electional) by Eduardo J. Gramaglia under Cazimi Press, Minneapolis.
