= Apuleius =

2nd-century Numidian Latin-language writer, rhetorician and philosopher

- Late antique ceiling painting c. 330, possibly of Apuleius but also possibly of Lactantius
- Born: c. 124; Madaurus, Numidia
- Died: c. 170 – c. 190
- Occupations: Novelist, writer, public speaker

Philosophical work
- School: Middle Platonism
- Notable works: The Golden Ass

Apuleius (/ˌæpjʊˈliːəs/ APP-yuu-LEE-əs), also called Lucius Apuleius Madaurensis (c. 124 – after 170), was a Numidian Latin-language prose writer, Platonist philosopher and rhetorician. He was born in the Roman province of Numidia, in the Berber city of Madauros, modern-day M'Daourouch, Algeria. He studied Platonism in Athens, travelled to Italy, Asia Minor, and Egypt, and was an initiate in several cults or mysteries. The most famous incident in his life was when he was accused of using magic to gain the attentions (and fortune) of a wealthy widow. He declaimed his own defense before the proconsul and a court of magistrates convened in Sabratha, near Oea (modern Tripoli, Libya). This speech, which Apuleius subsequently published, is known as the Apologia.

His most famous work is his bawdy picaresque novel the Metamorphoses, otherwise known as The Golden Ass. It is the only ancient Latin novel that has survived in its entirety. It relates the adventures of its protagonist, Lucius, who experiments with magic and is accidentally turned into a donkey. Lucius goes through various adventures before he is turned back into a human being by the goddess Isis.

== Life ==
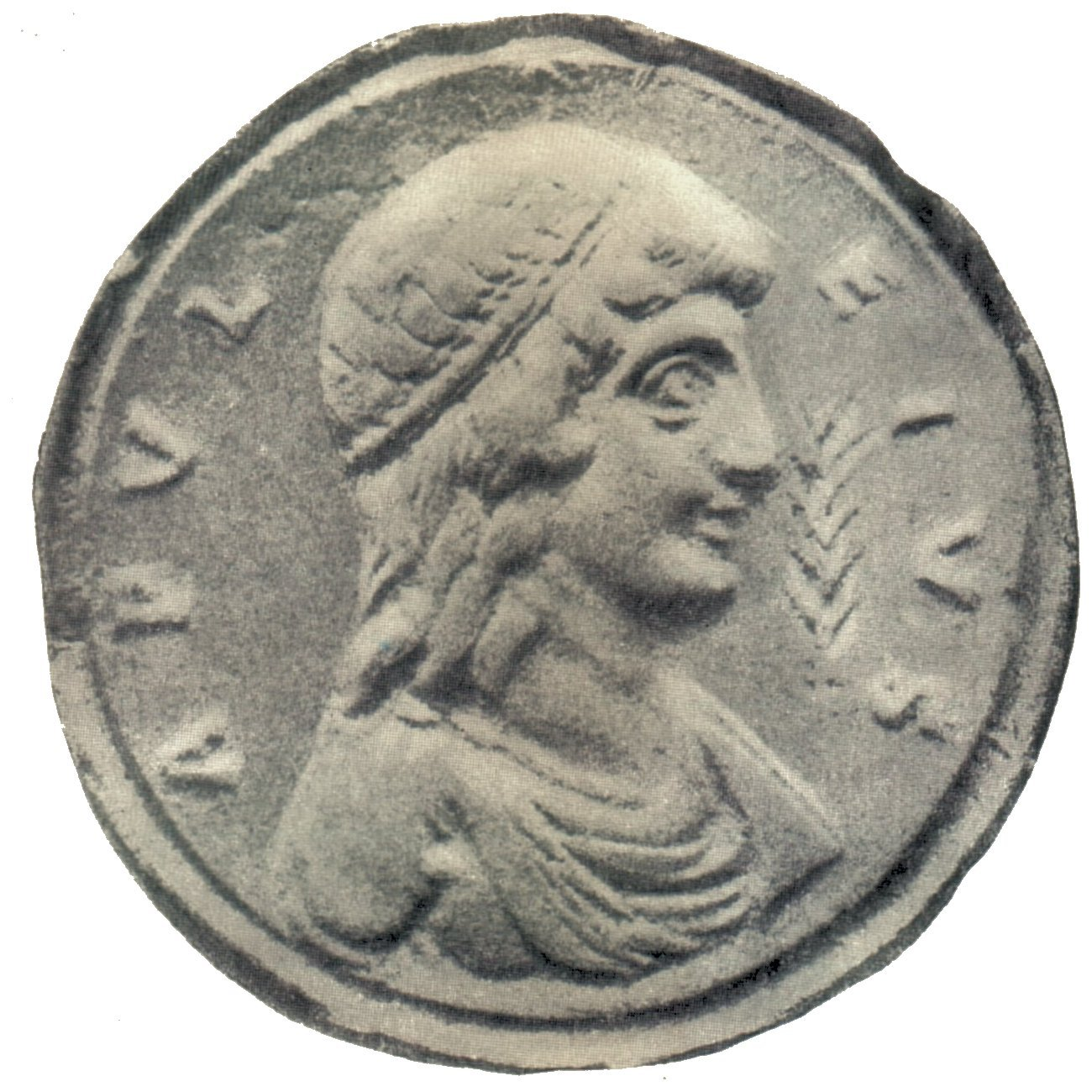
Imagined portrait of Apuleius on a medallion of the 4th century.

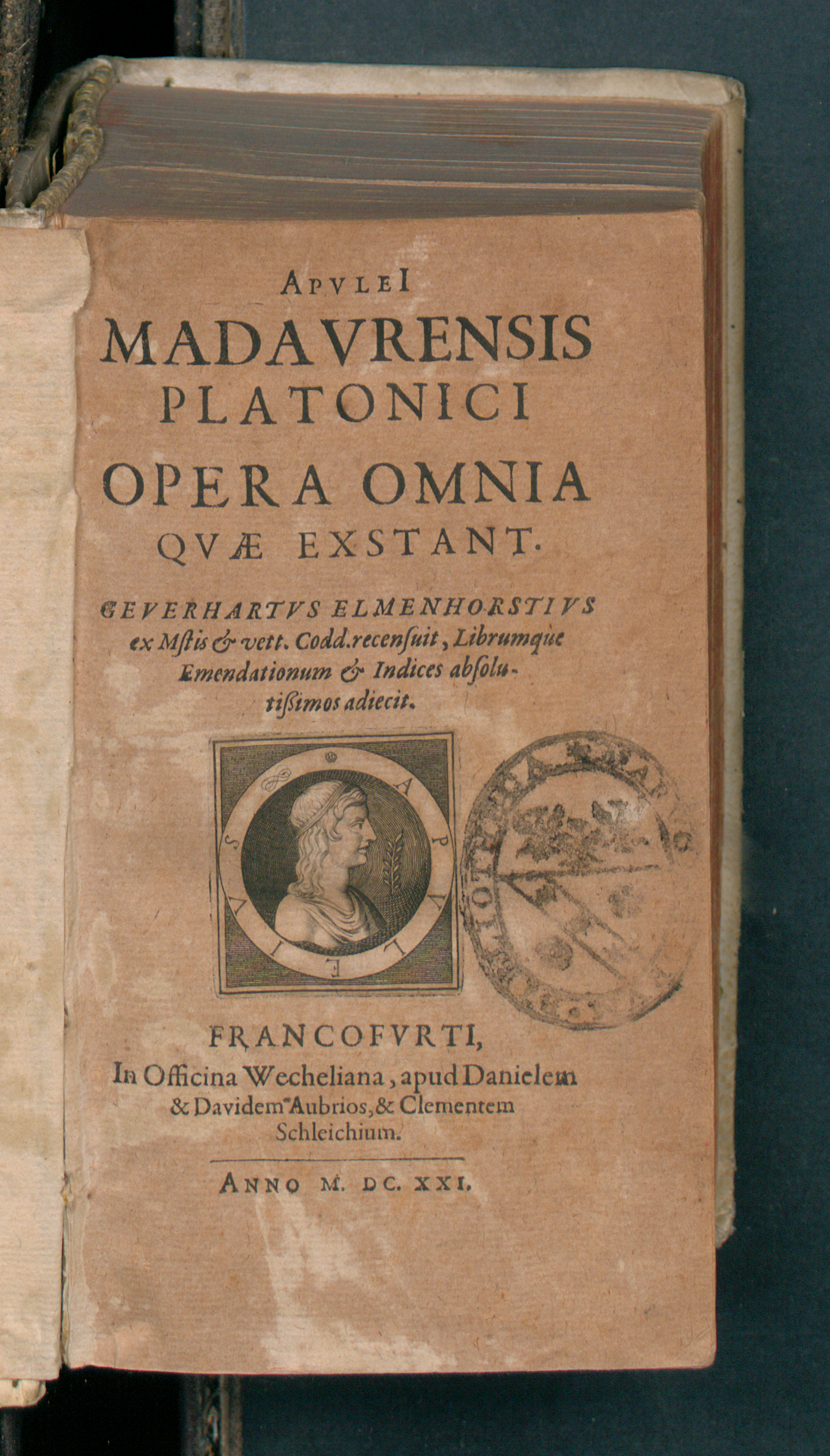
Apuleii Opera omnia (1621)

Apuleius was born in Madauros, a colonia in Numidia on the North African coast bordering Gaetulia, and he described himself as "half-Numidian half-Gaetulian." Madauros, in whose university Augustine of Hippo later received his early education, was located well away from the Romanized coast, but nonetheless contains some pristine Roman ruins. Apuleius's praenomen is not given in any ancient source; late-medieval manuscripts began the tradition of calling him Lucius after the hero of his novel. Details regarding his life come mostly from his defense speech (Apology) and his work Florida, a collection of excerpts from some of his best speeches.

Upon the death of their father, a duumvir, or municipal magistrate, Apuleius and his brother inherited nearly two million sesterces. Apuleius studied with a master at Carthage, where he later settled. After his initial stay in Carthage he moved on to Athens, studying Platonist philosophy among other subjects, and then to Rome to study Latin rhetoric and, most likely, to speak in the law courts for a time before returning to his native North Africa. He also travelled extensively in Asia Minor and Egypt, furthering his knowledge of philosophy and religion but also depleting his inheritance.

Apuleius was an initiate in several Greco-Roman mysteries, including the Dionysian Mysteries. (Note: As he proudly claims in his Apologia.) He was a priest of Asclepius and, according to Augustine, sacerdos provinciae Africae (i.e., priest of the province of Carthage).

Not long after his return home he set out upon a new journey to Alexandria. On his way there he was taken ill at the town of Oea (modern-day Tripoli) and was hospitably received into the house of Sicinius Pontianus, whom he had befriended in Athens. Pontianus's mother Pudentilla was a very rich widow. With her son's consent – indeed encouragement – Apuleius agreed to marry her. Pontianus's father-in-law, Herennius Rufinus, was indignant that Pudentilla's wealth should pass out of the family; he instigated Pontianus, Pontianus's younger brother Sicinius Pudens, a mere boy, and their paternal uncle, Sicinius Aemilianus, to join him in impeaching Apuleius upon the charge of gaining Pudentilla's affections by charms and magic spells. The case was heard at Sabratha, near Tripoli, c. 158 AD, before Claudius Maximus, proconsul of Africa. The accusation itself seems to have been ridiculous, and the spirited and triumphant defence spoken by Apuleius is still extant. This is known as the Apologia (A Discourse on Magic). Apuleius accuses an extravagant personal enemy of turning his house into a brothel and prostituting his wife.

Of his subsequent career, we know little. Judging from the many works of which he was author, he must have devoted himself diligently to literature. He occasionally gave speeches in public to great reception; he had the charge of exhibiting gladiatorial shows and wild beast events in the province, and statues were erected in his honour by the senate of Carthage and by other senates.

The date, place and circumstances of Apuleius' death are not known. There is no record of his activities after 170, a fact which has led some people to believe that he must have died about then (say in 171), although other scholars feel that he may still have been alive in 180 or even 190.

== Works ==
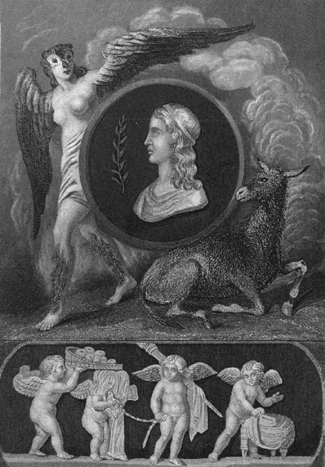
Frontispiece from the Bohn's Classical Library edition of The Works of Apuleius: a portrait of Apuleius flanked by Pamphile changing into an owl and the Golden Ass

=== The Golden Ass ===
The Golden Ass (Asinus Aureus) or Metamorphoses is the only Latin novel that has survived in its entirety. It relates the adventures of one Lucius, who introduces himself as related to the famous philosophers Plutarch and Sextus of Chaeronea. Lucius experiments with magic and is accidentally turned into an ass. In this guise, he hears and sees many unusual things, until escaping from his predicament in a rather unexpected way. Within this frame story are found many digressions, the longest among them being the well-known tale of Cupid and Psyche. This story is a rare instance of a fairy tale preserved in an ancient literary text.

The Metamorphoses ends with the (once again human) hero, Lucius, eager to be initiated into the mystery cult of Isis; he abstains from forbidden foods, bathes, and purifies himself. He is introduced to the Navigium Isidis. Then the secrets of the cult's books are explained to him, and further secrets are revealed before he goes through the process of initiation, which involves a trial by the elements on a journey to the underworld. Lucius is then asked to seek initiation into the cult of Osiris in Rome, and eventually is initiated into the pastophoroi – a group of priests that serves Isis and Osiris.

=== Apologia ===
Apologia (Apulei Platonici pro Se de Magia) is the version of the defence presented in Sabratha, in 158–159, before the proconsul Claudius Maximus, by Apuleius accused of the crime of magic. Between the traditional exordium and peroratio, the argumentation is divided into three sections:

1. Refutation of the accusations levelled against his private life. He demonstrates that by marrying Pudentilla he had no interested motive and that he carries it away, intellectually and morally, on his opponents.
2. Attempt to prove that his so-called "magical operations" were in fact indispensable scientific experiments for an imitator of Aristotle and Hippocrates, or the religious acts of a Roman Platonist.
3. A recount of the events that have occurred in Oea since his arrival and pulverize the arguments against him.

The main interest of the Apologia is historical, as it offers substantial information about its author, magic and life in Africa in the second century.

=== Other ===
His other works are:

- Florida. A compilation of twenty-three extracts from his various speeches and lectures.
- De Platone et dogmate eius (On Plato and His Doctrine). An outline in two books of Plato's physics and ethics, preceded by a life of Plato
- De Deo Socratis (On the God of Socrates). A work on the existence and nature of daemons, the intermediaries between gods and humans. This treatise was attacked by Augustine of Hippo in The City of God (Books VIII to X), while Lactantius reserved it for short-lived creatures. De Deo Socratis contains a passage comparing gods and kings which is the first recorded occurrence of the proverb "familiarity breeds contempt":
  parit enim conversatio contemptum, raritas conciliat admirationem
  (familiarity breeds contempt, rarity brings admiration)
- On the Universe. This Latin translation of Pseudo-Aristotle's work De Mundo is probably by Apuleius.

Apuleius wrote many other works which have not survived. He wrote works of poetry and fiction, as well as technical treatises on politics, dendrology, agriculture, medicine, natural history, astronomy, music, and arithmetic, and he translated Plato's Phaedo.

=== Spurious ===
Extant works wrongly attributed to Apuleius include:

- Peri Hermeneias (On Interpretation). A brief Latin version of a guide to Aristotelian logic.
- Asclepius. A Latin paraphrase of a lost Greek dialogue (The Perfect Discourse) featuring Asclepius and Hermes Trismegistus.
- Herbarium Apuleii Platonici by Pseudo-Apuleius.

== Apuleian Sphere ==
The Apuleian Sphere described in Petosiris to Nechepso, also known as "Columcille's Circle" or "Petosiris' Circle", is a magical prognosticating device for predicting the survival of a patient.

== See also ==
- Boethius
- Square of opposition
