= Sky (hieroglyph) =

Egyptian hieroglyph

N1
Sky
(heaven)
in hieroglyphs

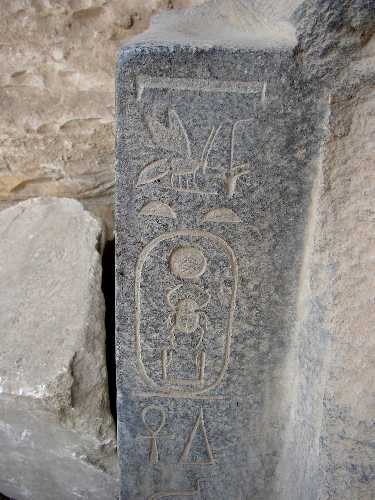
Relief with cartouche.

The ancient Egyptian Sky hieroglyph, (also translated as heaven in some texts, or iconography), is Gardiner sign listed no. N1, within the Gardiner signs for sky, earth, and water.

The Sky hieroglyph is used like an Egyptian language biliteral-(but is not listed there) and an ideogram in pt, "sky"; it is a determinative in other synonyms of sky. For the language value hrt, it has the phonetic value hry.

The Sky hieroglyph is often written with the complement of its component values of "p", and "t", Q3, X1 in a hieroglyph composition block, N1 Q3 X1 meaning "pt", or commonly 'pet'.

== Pt, with Gods and the Pharaoh ==
The Sky hieroglyph can be found in iconography with the gods, especially Ra as referencing the Lord of P(e)t, (Lord of Heaven), and the God's ownership of Pet. The Pharaoh is often equally named as the Lord of Pet.

Some ancient Egyptian names using the sky hieroglyph are Petosiris and the god Petbe.

== Ligatured variants of Sky ==
The simple 'vault' of the sky hieroglyph has variants that are ligatured with it. Three of these are given separate entries in Gardiner's sign list:

1–The Sky with 4 Props–Sky combined with 4 Props, N4 Used for word i3dt, "dew"; determinative for šnyt-(-(sh)nyt), "rain".

2–The Sky with Was-staff–Sky with Staff, N2 Used for words meaning obscurity: grh and wh, for "night", and kkw, for "dark".

3–The Sky with Oar-(for staff)–Replacement: N3 Same as Sky with Was-staff

The hieroglyphs used in the three ligatures are the Prop, Gardiner O30, Was-staff, S40, and Oar, P8: O30, S40, P8.

== Why the sky hieroglyph is not a biliteral ==
Though the sky hieroglyph is used as pt, in the Coptic alphabet, for the Coptic language, (the follow-on to the Egyptian hieroglyphs), the spelling of the "sky" is "pe" in Coptic. Consequently, Budge's 2-volume dictionary lists the sky hieroglyph under "pe-t"

In the short P word section in the Egyptian dictionaries, the end of the P's has the pd, and pdj. In the languages the d's and t's are listed together; they are the unaspirated and the aspirated. (See d, and dj, the hieroglyphs for "hand" and "cobra".) The pd is represented by 'feet', and parts of them, and 'running', and the hieroglyph for 'extend', Gardiner no. T9-(similar to a bow), T9 (Many of the entries also refer to items about the bow, i.e. "stringing a bow", etc.) The pdj then refers to bowmen, etc., and especially the Nine bows. The archers of the 1350 BC Amarna letters, the archers (Egyptian pitati) get their name of 'pitati' from these related pd words.

Preceded by Q3; Stool-or-mat (hieroglyph) unileral-P (start of P's)	N1 sky-("heaven") "pt"	Succeeded by G40; Bird in flight p3-(pa)

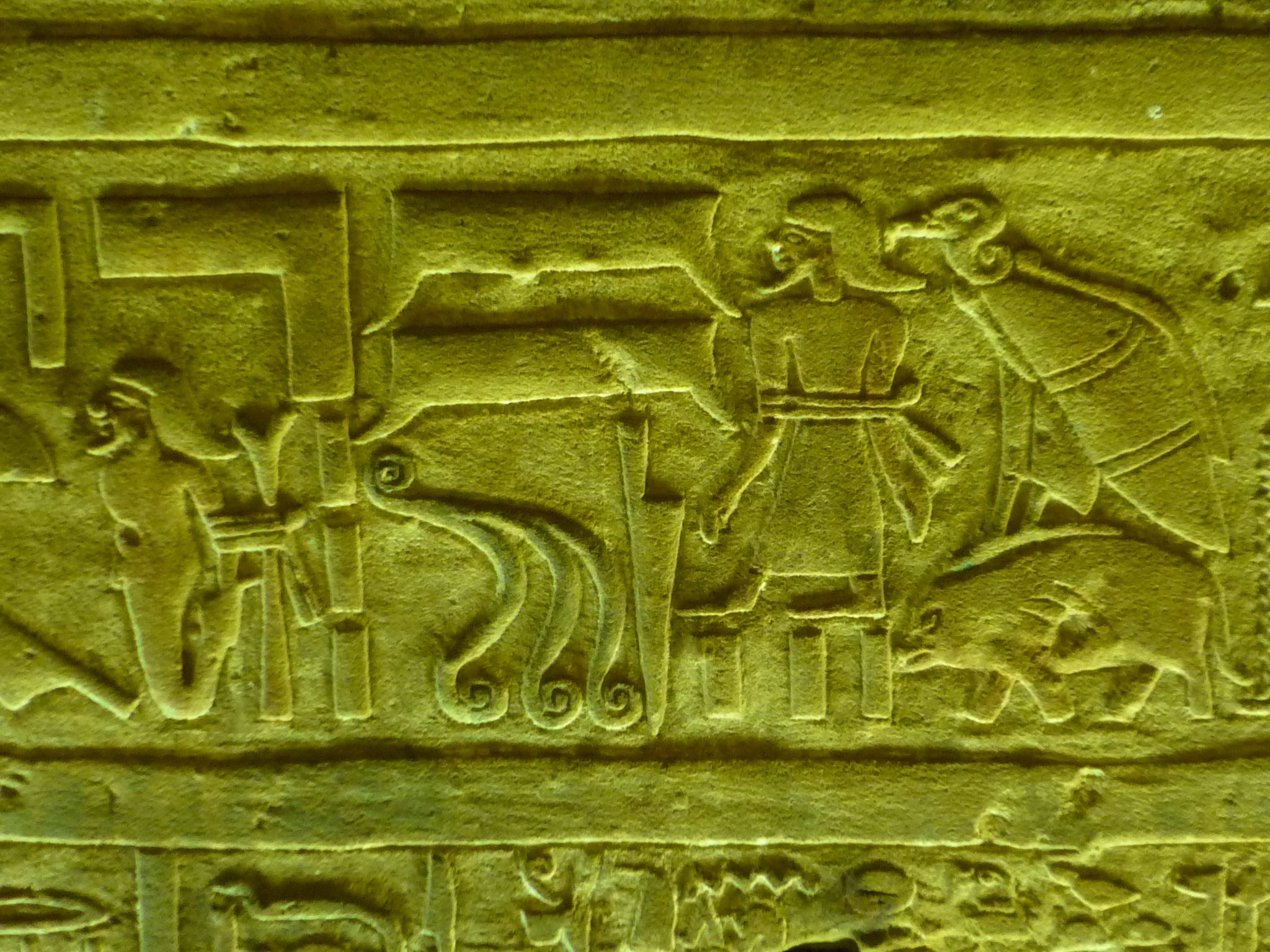
Relief

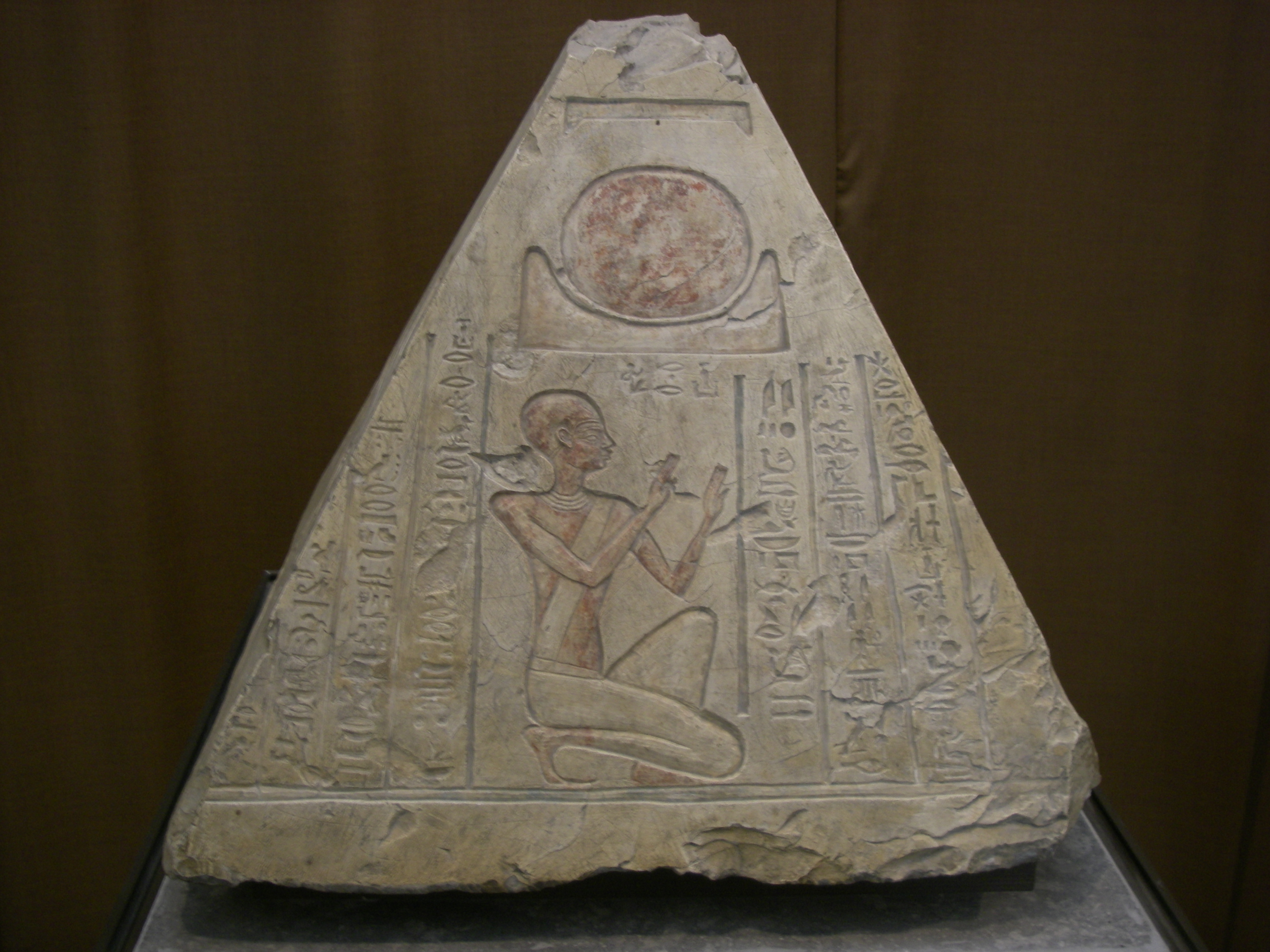
Pyramidion

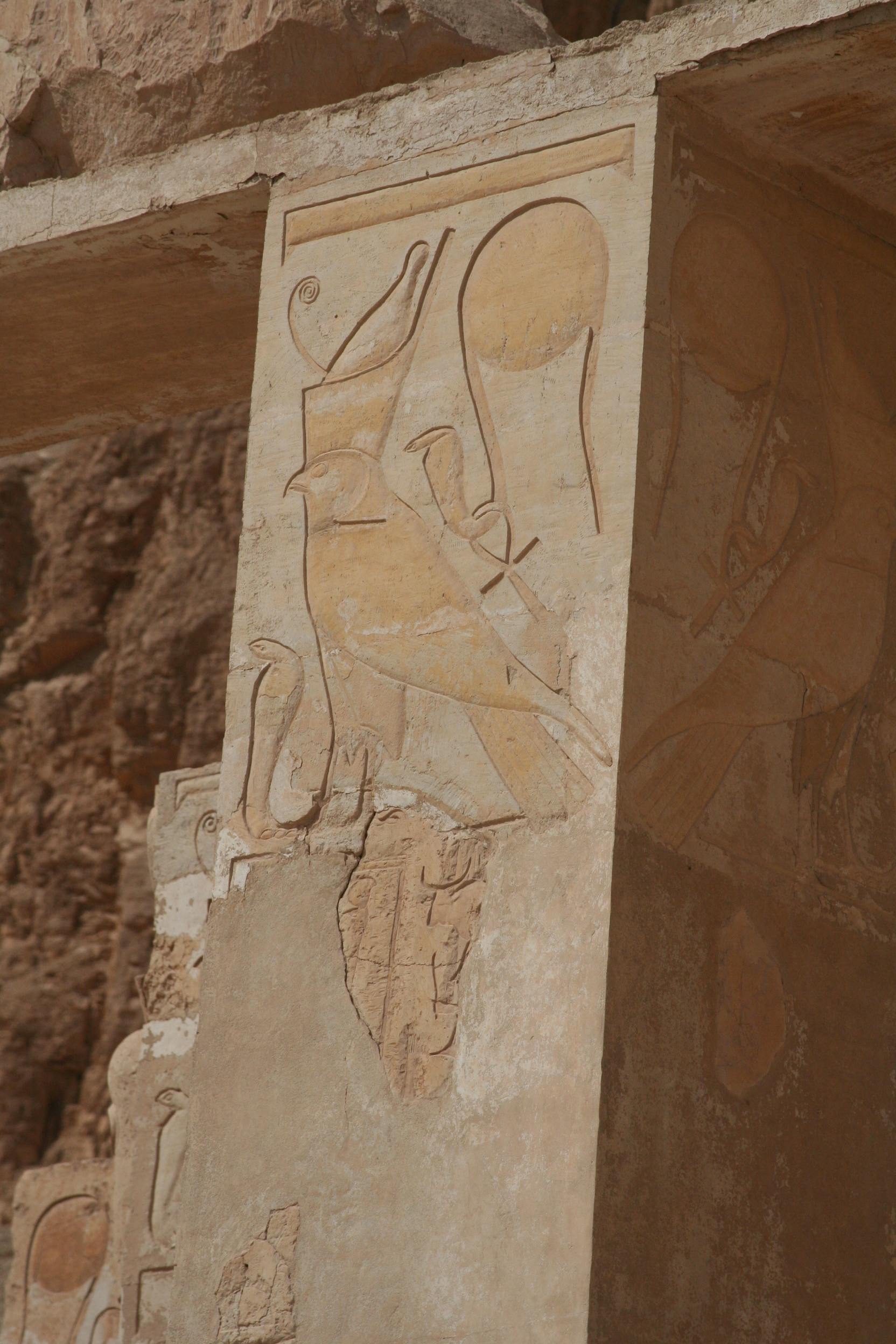
Temple of Hatshepsut

Hieroglyph-(using Sky hieroglyph)

== See also ==
- Gardiner's Sign List#N. Sky, Earth, Water
- List of Egyptian hieroglyphs
- Nut (goddess)
