= Critodemus =

Ancient Greek astrologer

Critodemus was a Greek astrologer. "One of the earliest known authors on astrology", he was used as a source by Pliny and Vettius Valens among others. His dates are uncertain but 1st century AD at the latest.
