= Rhetorius =

Ancient Greek astrologer

Rhetorius of Egypt (Greek: Ῥητόριος) was the last major classical astrologer from whom we have any excerpts. He lived in the sixth or early seventh century, in the early Byzantine era. He wrote an extensive compendium in Greek of the techniques of the Hellenistic astrologers who preceded him, and is one of our best sources for the work of Antiochus of Athens. Although no intact original manuscript survives of his work, we do have several late Byzantine versions of it.

Rhetorius provides important confirmation of the survival of the more obscure astrological techniques of Vettius Valens, the practicing astrologer whose tradition is somewhat at variance with the more well-known methods of Claudius Ptolemy; for example, in his treatment of the Lot of Fortune as a horoskopos, much as Valens treated Lots, and in his use of sect with lots. In addition, Rhetorius discusses the late-Roman systems of time lords, a topic which came to be heavily developed by the Persians, Arabs and medieval Europeans. Rhetorius provides an informative link between the earlier Hellenistic tradition and the Arab and medieval practices that followed him.

== Sources ==
- Rhetorius qui dictur: Compendium astrologicum: Libri Vi et VI, edited by David Pingree, Berlin, Walter de Gruyter, 2007.
- Rhetorius the Egyptian, Astrological Compendium (Tempe, Az.: A.F.A., Inc., 2009.) translated by James Herschel Holden.
- Robert Schmidt, Project Hindsight.
- Dorian Gieseler Greenbaum (translation and commentary). Late Classical Astrology: Paulus Alexandrinus and Olympiodorus (with the Scholia of later Latin Commentators). ARHAT, 2001.
- Rhetorius of Egypt on The Hellenistic Astrology website.
