= Omar Tiberiades =

Medieval Persian astrologer

Omar Tiberiades or Abū Ḥafṣ ʿUmar ibn al-Farrukhān al-Tabari (d. ca. 815), (Persian أبو حفص عمر بن الفرخان الطبري) was a Medieval Persian astrologer and architect from Tabaristan.

The historical Tabaristan region is in the present-day Mazandaran Province of northern Iran. He was part of a group of astrologers, including Naubakht, Mashallah ibn Athari and Muḥammad ibn Ibrāhīm al-Fazārī, who was asked by Caliph al-Mansur to choose a favorable time for the founding of Baghdad (July 30, 762). The last date in which at-Tabari is mentioned is the month of Shawwal 196 AH (from June 15 to July 13, 812), when he completed The Four Books (commentary to Ptolemy's Tetrabiblos).

== Works ==
Around the year 800, Tiberiades translated the Middle Persian version of the Pentateuch by Dorotheus of Sidon. He translated the five books into the Arabic language.

A Latin translation of his book was often quoted by Western astrologers.

== See also ==
- Medieval Iran
- History of Mazandaran Province
