= Luminary (astrology) =

Astrology: two planets that give light

The luminaries were what traditional astrologers called the two astrological "planets" which were the brightest and most important objects in the heavens, that is, the Sun and the Moon. Luminary means, source of light. The Sun and Moon, being the most abundant sources of light to the inhabitants of Earth are known as luminaries. The astrological significance warrants the classification of the Sun and Moon separately from the planets, in that the Sun and Moon have to do with man's spiritual consciousness, while the planetary influences operate through the physical mechanism. The Moon is a luminary in the biblical sense that it affords to Man "light by night". Some early, Pre-Newtonian astronomers to observe and study luminaries include Pythagoras, Aristotle, Claudius Ptolemy, al-Khwarizmi, Nicolaus Copernicus, Tycho Brahe, Galileo Galilei, and Johannes Kepler.

== Origins ==
The Sun and Moon were considered the rulers of day, and night, in accordance with the doctrine of astrology of sect: diurnal (or daytime) planets, which were ruled by the Sun, and nocturnal (or nighttime) planets, which were ruled by the Moon.

The Sun was also the sect ruler—or the luminary of sect for all charts of events and individuals born in the daytime, when the Sun was over the horizon; and the Moon was the sect ruler or luminary of sect for night charts, when the Sun was below the horizon.

Ancient astrologers divided all astrological factors into day and night groups: essential dignities, Arabian Parts (or "Lots") and all planetary characteristics. Even each of the Starry planets themselves "belonged" to one luminary or the other. The luminary "in charge" of any given chart was called the luminary of sect. (See sect.)

The luminaries can be found in the Bible:

And God made two great lights; the greater light to rule the day, and the lesser light to rule the night: He made the stars also. And God set them in the firmament of the heaven to give light upon the earth, And to rule over the day and over the night, and to divide the light from the darkness: and God saw that it was good. (Genesis 1:16-18, King James Version)

In modern Western astrology, the importance of the Moon and the Sun has even come to outweigh all the other celestial factors. In the interpretation of chart data. In Hindu astrology, the Moon (and the Ascendant) have that distinction.

== Early beliefs of the Sun and Moon ==
In the early history of all people we find the Sun and Moon regarded as human beings, connected with the daily life of mankind, and influencing in some mysterious way man's existence, and controlling his/her destiny. We find the luminaries alluded to as ancestors, heroes, and benefactors, who, after a life of usefulness on Earth, were transported to the heavens, where they continue to look down on, and, in a measure, rule over earthly affairs. The basis of mythology is the worship of the solar great father, and the lunar great mother. For centuries, people have worshiped and regarded the luminaries as objects of higher powers. Oftentimes, the Sun and Moon have been considered as opposite sexes. For example, the Sun being "the father" and the Moon being "the mother". In Australia, the Moon was considered to be a man, the Sun a woman, who appears at dawn in a coat of red kangaroo skins. Shakespeare speaks of the Moon as "she," while in Peru, the Moon was regarded as a mother who was both sister and wife of the Sun. The sex of each has been disputed and thought of differently over the centuries. This confusion in the sex, ascribed to the Sun and Moon by different nations, may have arisen from the fact that the day is mild and friendly, hence the Sun which rules the day would properly be considered feminine, while the Moon which rules the chill and stern night might appropriately be regarded as a man. On the contrary, in equatorial regions, the day is forbidding and burning, while the night is mild and pleasant. Applying these analogies, it appears that the sex of the Sun and Moon would, by some tribes, be the reverse of those ascribed to them by others, climatic conditions being responsible for the confusion.

Also many cultures believe the Sun and Moon to be husband and wife or brother and sister. From the conception that the Sun and Moon were husband and wife many legends concerning them were created, chief among these being the old Persian belief that the stars were the children of the Sun and Moon. As common with many marriages it was also thought that the sun and moons marriage was an uneasy one. There are many legends of the Sun and Moon that relate their disputes and marital troubles, for mythology reveals that as husband and wife the Sun and Moon did not live happily together, some of these explaining the reason of seasons and weather. The myths and thoughts of the relationship between the Sun and Moon and their role in the universe are high in quantity. Correlations and connections can be made with some of these beliefs but oftentimes many disagree with others.

== Luminaries in medicine ==
In early modern England, the medical effects of the Sun and the Moon had been traditionally explained by a vast symbolic system of "analogies, correspondences, and relations among apparently discrete elements in man and the universe," which had its conceptual origins in the works of Aristotle, Ptolemy, and Galen. The ultimate causes of planetary emanations had been considered "occult," an Aristotelian and early modern term utilized when distinguishing "qualities which were evident to the senses from those which were hidden" After the Restoration, many physicians attempted to rid the natural world of occult causes and to explain invisible forces solar and lunar emanations via mechanical, chemical, and mathematical systems.

To explain the medical effects of the luminaries, the English physicians Richard Mead (1673-1754) and James Gibbs (d. 1724) utilized iatromechanism, which regarded the body as a Cartesian machine, conforming in its functions to mechanical laws. Physiological phenomena could thus be explained in terms of physics. Richard Mead subsequently applied Newton's gravitational theories to Pitcairne's hydraulic iatromechanism and astrological medicine. In De imperio solis ac lunae in corpora humana et morbis inde oriundis [A treatise concerning the influence of the Sun and moon on human bodies and the diseases thereby produced] (1704), Mead stressed the mechanical effects of solar and lunar emanations, especially the gravitational effects of the tides, on the pressure of vessels and fluids within the human body.
