= John Kamateros =

John Kamateros (Greek: Ἰωάννης Καματηρός, romanized: John Camaterus, can refer to:

- John Kamateros (logothetes tou dromou), senior official under Emperor Manuel I Komnenos
- John X of Constantinople, Patriarch of Constantinople in 1183–86
