= Hypsomata =

Hypsoma (Babylonian nisirti ašar or bit nisirti; "hidden place"; pl. hypsomata) is a Greek word indicating the ecliptic high point of a celestial body, as seen from Earth (geocentric perspective). In Babylonian astronomy (wherein we have the prime mention of the phenomenon) the hypsomata of stars and planets are described in the Astrolabe B and in the ^{mul}.APIN: each star of Ea's path has its special hypsoma.

== Literature ==
- Dietz-Otto Edzard u.a.: Reallexikon der Assyriologie und vorderasiatischen Archäologie, Bd. 2, de Gruyter, Berlin 1978, ISBN 3-11-004450-1, S. 380-381
- Hermann Hunger, David Pingree: Astral sciences in Mesopotamia, Brill, Leiden 1999, ISBN 90-04-10127-6, S. 28
- Alexandra von Lieven: Der Himmel über Esna – Eine Fallstudie zur religiösen Astronomie in Ägypten am Beispiel der kosmologischen Decken- und Architravinschriften im Tempel von Esna. Harrassowitz, Wiesbaden 2000, ISBN 3-447-04324-5
