= Arabic parts =

Astrology: mathematical calculations of three horoscope entities

In astrology, the Arabic parts or lots are constructed points based on mathematical calculations of three horoscopic entities such as planets or angles. The distance between two of the points is added to the position of the third (very often the ascendant) to derive the location of the lot.

== History ==
The lots are a very ancient astrological technique which can be traced back to pre-Hellenistic sources. Their origin is obscure; they could originally be Babylonian, Ancient Egyptian, Magian, Persian or Hermetic, but by the time of Dorotheus of Sidon in the first century A.D. (and probably earlier) they had become an established tenet of Hellenistic astrological practice.

One of the best informational sources for the lots is the Introduction to Astrology by fourth-century astrologer Paulus Alexandrinus and the Commentary on this work by sixth-century philosopher Olympiodorus the Younger. Paulus used a dozen or so major lots for almost every aspect of his analysis. The most important of these were the Lot of Fortune (or Part of Fortune) and its complement, the Lot of Spirit.

After the fall of the Roman Empire, all of the classical legacy, including astrology, fell to the Abbasid Arabs and Persians. Abbasid astrologers translated sources from Greek and produced many of their own astrologers who wrote a considerable amount in Arabic on astrology. Although it is not clear whether the number of lots began to proliferate in late Antiquity or whether it was purely the product of the fascination the Abbasids had for them, Arabic manuscripts show an explosion in the number of lots that were used over the next several centuries. The inordinate increase is noted by the Abbasid commentators themselves. In The Abbreviation of the Introduction to Astrology, Persian astrologer Abu Ma'shar al-Balkhi (787-886) describes no less than 55 lots, although it's clear that these are only the ones he considers significant. This count does not even include all of the lots of Paulus.

Beginning in the tenth century, many Abbasid era Arabic manuscripts were translated into Latin, becoming the means by which Classical astrology found its way back to Europe. Medieval astrologers, most notably the major 13th-century Italian, Guido Bonatti, a contemporary of Dante, assumed it was the Abbasids who originated the concept of the lots, and hence they came eventually to be called the "Arabic parts".

By the time of William Lilly (XVII century), only the Lot of Fortune continued to be used by astrologers, although in a manner that would be considered strange by ancient practitioners. Lilly's methods with what he called "Fortuna" have continued in modern astrology, although rarely used and usually misunderstood. The Lot of Fortune mainly appears today in horary practice.

== Calculating the Lot of Fortune ==
Lilly's Part of Fortune (or Pars Fortunae) is calculated as Ascendant + Moon - Sun. That is, the degrees of distance (going in the direction of the signs) between the Sun and the Moon is calculated and then that same distance is measured from the point of the ascendant.

The same procedure was used by the Arabs and by Hellenistic astrologers to calculate the Lot of Fortune but there were two major differences:

- The location of the lot varied considerably in charts where the Sun was above the horizon (that is, a daytime chart, or one of diurnal sect) or below the horizon (a nighttime chart, or one of nocturnal sect). The day charts follow Lilly's procedure; nighttime charts reverse the direction in which the measurement is taken between the Sun and Moon, so that the astrologer measures from the Moon to the Sun (again, going in the direction of the signs) to get this arc. As with day charts, the arc is then measured from the ascendant to get the lot. The two formulas are, therefore:
  - Day chart: Ascendant + Moon - Sun
  - Night chart: Ascendant - Moon + Sun
- Interpretatively, the Lot of Fortune was used to represent the body, fortune, and health. It was also used in place of the ascendant thereby changing the starting point from where houses were numbered., to find out more about these factors. Lilly and his contemporaries used the Lot of Fortune as a simple indicator of material well-being and, in horary charts, a marker of success.

The symbol for the Lot of Fortune is (U+1F774 🝴).

== The Lot of Spirit ==
If the Lot of Fortune deals with material well-being, the body, fortune and health, the Lot of Spirit represents the initiative taken by that person, or what use is made of what is given.

The Lot of Spirit is the reverse of the Lot of Fortune, giving the following formulas:

- Day chart: Ascendant - Moon + Sun
- Night chart: Ascendant + Moon - Sun

== The Hermetic lots ==
The Hermetic lots are a specific set of seven lots, each associated with one of the seven visible planets (including the Sun and Moon), that were attributed to the figure Hermes Trismegistus in the Hellenistic tradition of astrology. This set of lots appears in the work of the 4th century astrologer Paulus Alexandrinus, as well as in his later commentator Olympiodorus the Younger. The formulas for the lots can be found in Paulus and are reproduced in the table below with formulas for daytime and nighttime births. The Lots of Fortune and Spirit are associated with the sun and moon, while further lots are calculated by the angular distance from one of the five classical planets and a given lot added to the ascendant. The benefic planets are associated with the Lot of Spirit while malefic planets and Mercury are associated with the Lot of Fortune.

Seven Hermetic Lots
Lot	Greek Name	Diurnal	Nocturnal
Lot of Fortune	Κλῆρος Τύχης	Asc + Moon - Sun	Asc + Sun - Moon
Lot of Spirit	Κλῆρος Δαίμονος	Asc + Sun - Moon	Asc + Moon - Sun
Lot of Eros	Κλῆρος Ἔρωτος	Asc + Venus - Spirit	Asc + Spirit - Venus
Lot of Victory	Κλῆρος Νίκης	Asc + Jupiter - Spirit	Asc + Spirit - Jupiter
Lot of Necessity	Κλῆρος Ανάγκης	Asc + Fortune - Mercury	Asc + Mercury - Fortune
Lot of Courage	Κλῆρος Τόλμης	Asc + Fortune - Mars	Asc + Mars - Fortune
Lot of Nemesis	Κλῆρος Νεμέσεως	Asc + Fortune - Saturn	Asc + Saturn - Fortune

The formulas for the Hermetic lots later made their way into the Medieval astrological tradition where they appear in authors such as Abu Ma'shar al-Balkhi and Guido Bonatti, although their lists have been combined with an alternate lot tradition derived from the 2nd century astrologer Vettius Valens.
