= Petosiris to Nechepso =

Hellenistic astrologers

Petosiris to Nechepso is a letter describing an ancient divination technique using numerology and a diagram. It is likely to be a pseudepigraph. Petosiris and Nechepso are considered to be the founders of astrology in some traditions. One translation of this letter into Latin is attributed to Saint Bede, and can be found in British Library, MS Cotton Tiberius C. II.

The technique is known by several names, including the Petosiris Circle, the Sphere of Apuleius, Columcille's Circle, and Democritus's Sphere. The attribution of ancient authors is a typical practice of Neoplatonism and Gnosticism, and the technique may arise from this tradition. Examples of the figure are known from Anglo-Saxon manuscripts.

The technique involves calculating the numerical value of a patient's name, then dividing by 30 or 29, a number derived from the lunar month to find the remainder, which is (mod 29) or (mod 30) in modular arithmetic. The number is then found on the diagram, to determine the prognosis.

== See also ==
- Computus

== Bibliography ==
- Fuentes González, Pedro Pablo, “Néchepso-Pétosiris”, in R. Goulet (ed.), Dictionnaire des Philosophes Antiques, vol. IV, Paris, CNRS, 2005, p. 601-615.
