= Columcille the Scribe =

Poem in Old Irish, notably translated by Séamus Heaney

Columcille the Scribe is a poem ascribed to Columba, though like a majority of such poems they were probably composed in the eleventh and twelfth centuries. With due regard to the discrepancy in attribution, the poem is sometimes known by its first line in Irish – is scíth mo chrob ón scríbainn (my hand is weary from writing).

== History ==
The earliest known copy of the text now known as "Columcille the Scribe" is from the 16th century and held at the Bodleian Library in Oxford. This is understood to be a reproduction of an earlier poem.

== The poem ==
The poem is written in Old Irish:

Is scíth mo chrob ón scríbainn;

ní dígainn mo glés géroll;

sceithid mo phenn gulban cáelda

dig n-dáelda do dub glégorm.

Bruinnid srúaim n-ecna n-dedairn

as mo láim degduinn desmais;

doirtid a dig for duilinn

do dub in chuilinn chnesglais.

Sínim mo phenn m-bec m-bráenach

tar áenach lebar lígoll

gan scor, fri selba ségann,

dían scíth mo chrob ón scríbonn.

The poem is told from the perspective of a scribe (almost certainly a monk) who complains of a weary hand from so much writing, but that he must continue because he is compelled by divine inspiration to record wisdom so that it is not lost. The poem's reference to the author's pen releasing a liquid flux of wisdom and power over multiple pages has been described as Freudian.

== In translation ==
Seamus Heaney wrote a literary translation of the poem to celebrate his enrolment as a member of the Royal Irish Academy in 1997, which he presented in vellum in a manner similar to the manuscript in the Bodleian Library. He chose this poem as it was the fourteen-hundredth anniversary of Columba. His translation was later included in his collection Human Chain. Heaney's version includes a nod to the opening line of Finnegans Wake by James Joyce.

Prior to Heaney, Kuno Meyer wrote a translation of the poem.

== Legacy ==
Heaney's version was included in Transport for London's "Poems on the Underground" series.
