= Sun-rising (hieroglyph) =

Egyptian hieroglyph

N28
Rising Sun
(Coronation of
King, Pharaoh)
in hieroglyphs

N28 D36 Aa1 D36
Rising Sun
(variations-Khā)
in hieroglyphs

The Egyptian hieroglyph Rising Sun (Gardiner N28) is used to represent "coronation", and related meanings (festivals, parades, rejoicing, etc.). Its phonetic value is ḫꜥ ("kha"). It is used in the Horus name of pharaoh Khasekhemwy (Ḫꜥj-sḫm.wj) of the Second Dynasty.

== Language usage of "Rising sun"-(Khā) ==
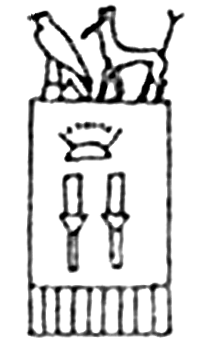
Khasekhemwy, Pharaoh of 2nd Dynasty. Serekh, using the Horus–falcon, and the Set-animal (hieroglyph). (for his name: rising sun: Kha + sekhemwy.

== See also ==
- Gardiner's Sign List#N. Sky, Earth, Water
- List of Egyptian hieroglyphs
- Sun (hieroglyph)
- Egyptian biliteral signs
