= Sun (hieroglyph) =

Egyptian hieroglyph

N5
Sun
"sun-disc"
in hieroglyphs

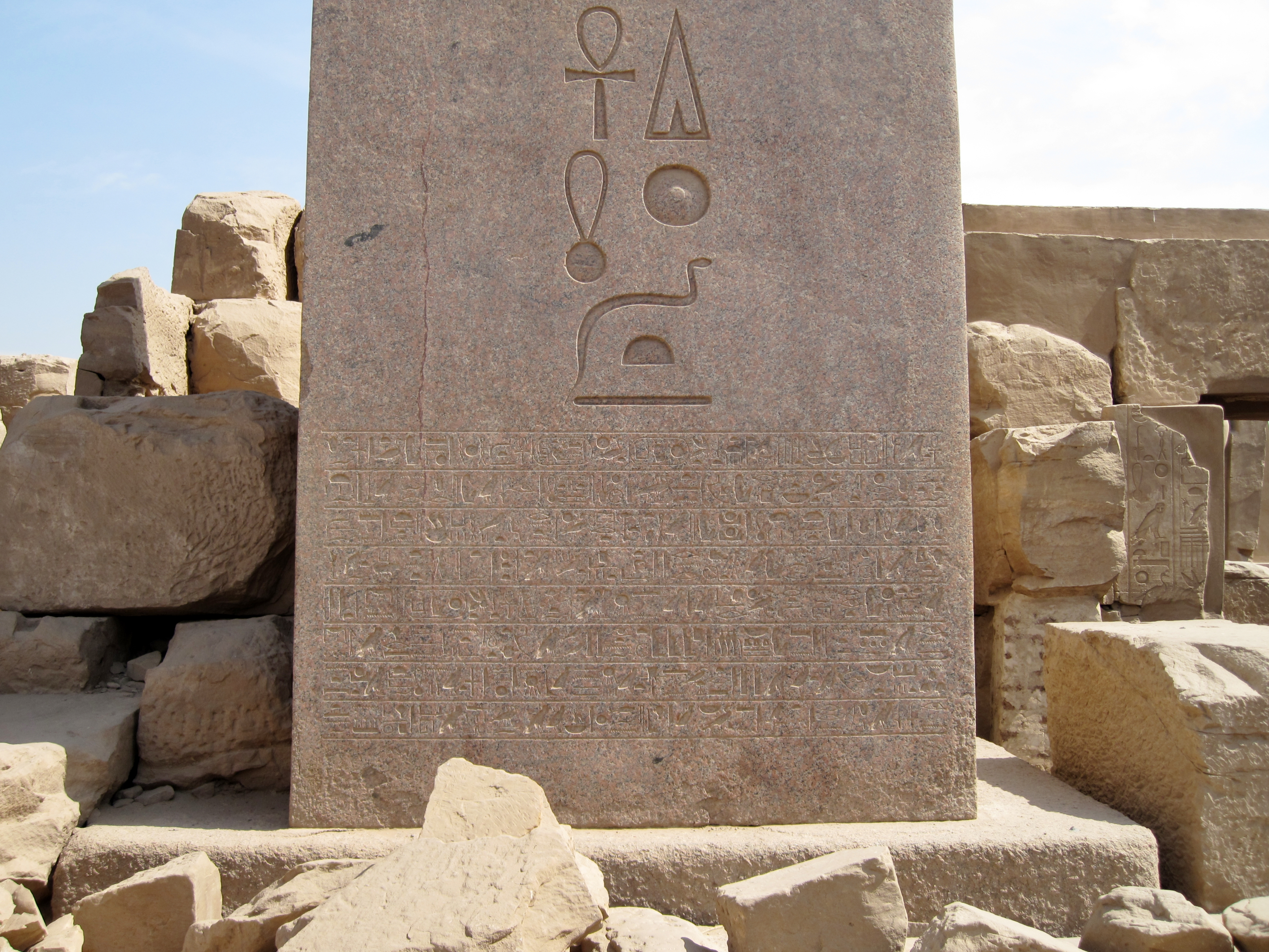
Hieroglyphs at Karnak. (di-ankh, Rā-ma, djet) X8 S34 N5 W19 I10 X1 N17 (Note:Reversed in the Gardiner font.) X8 S34 N5 W19

The ancient Egyptian Sun hieroglyph is Gardiner sign listed no. N5 for the sun-disc; it is also one of the hieroglyphs that refers to the god Ra.

The sun hieroglyph is used in the ancient Egyptian language hieroglyphs as a determinative to refer to events of time, for example when referring to '"day xx" (of month yy') . Even the "snap-of-the-finger", a 'moment', or 'instant' of time is represented using a Hippopotamus head (hieroglyph), Gardiner no. F3: F3, with the sun-disc: N5, as the time determinative in a hieroglyphic composition block.F3 N5 Z1

In the 24th century BC Palermo Stone, the sun hieroglyph is used on the Palermo Piece-(obverse) of the 7-piece Palermo Stone to identify dates, or specific "day-events", ..."day of ...." A few of the King Year-Register's are dates only for example in Row V (of VI rows):

N11 N11 N5 V20 V20 Z2ss

For: "Month 2, N11 N11, Day N5 23" (number 10, 10, 3).
Some other common hieroglyphs based on the sun hieroglyph, are the Sun-with-rays (hieroglyph), Gardiner no. N8: N8, and Sun-rising (hieroglyph)-(Coronations, "Appearance of..."-Palermo Stone), no. N28. N28. In the 24th century BC Palermo Stone: "Appearance of the King of the South and Appearance of the King of the North".
Ra, the Sun-god is Gardiner listed no. C1, of the listed: Anthropomorphic Deities–(more than 20 listed, and other Gardiner unlisted forms used in Ancient Egypt). The God Ra is shown with a sun-disc upon his head – or another common form with the Sun disc, encircled with Uraeus, (the cobra): C1

== Luwian hieroglyph ==
The Luwian language hieroglyphs, Luwian hieroglyphs has 7 varieties for the syllable of 's' and 'a'. For 'sa' number 4 (Sa_{4}).

== See also ==
- Gardiner's Sign List#N. Sky, Earth, Water
- List of Egyptian hieroglyphs
- Sun rising-Coronation (hieroglyph)
