= Astrology of sect =

Categories for planet

Sect is an ancient astrological concept in which the seven traditional "planets" (including the Sun, the Moon and the five starry planets) are assigned to two different categories: diurnal or nocturnal sect.

As can be seen by the example of Mercury, which is more obscured by being occidental, sect is a form of astrological polarity, much as the distinction between masculine and feminine planets. Since some planets were seen to be stronger in a positive or masculine environment, and others were seen to be more effective in a negative or feminine environment, whether a planet is in sect in any given chart was of particular importance to Hellenistic astrologers, who gave sect greater weight than any other astrological factor. The luminary of sect is the luminary which is said to rule each sect.

The Sun is the luminary of sect in a day chart (where the Sun is above the horizon) and the Moon is the luminary of sect in a night chart (when the Sun is below the horizon.) This distinction was crucial in determining the location of the astrological Lots – especially in Hellenistic astrology.

== The planets ==
Diurnal planets are more comfortable and powerful when they appear in charts in which the Sun is above the horizon. They include:

- Sun
- Jupiter
- Saturn

Nocturnal planets are more comfortable and powerful when they appear in charts in which the Sun is below the horizon, or at night. They are:

- Moon
- Venus
- Mars

Mercury, a hermaphroditic and very adaptable planet, possesses no inherent sect. Mercury changes its sect orientation depending upon whether it is oriental of the Sun (that is, positioned so that it rises before the Sun rises and sets before the Sun sets), in which case it is diurnal in sect; or occidental (that is, rising after the Sun rises and setting after the Sun sets), in which case it is of nocturnal sect.

== Historical usage ==
Medieval astrology became even more complex in its treatment of sect – although the factor itself became considerably less important. The Arab astrologers of the Middle Ages defined three forms of sect:

- a planet is in sect when it is in a chart where the Sun's position corresponds to its sect (such as Jupiter in a day chart, or when the Sun is above the horizon; or Mars in a night chart, when the Sun is below the horizon);
- a planet can still be in some sect if its sign polarity corresponds with its inherent sect (the idea being that Aries, Gemini, Leo, Libra, Sagittarius, and Aquarius were masculine or diurnal signs, whereas Taurus, Cancer, Virgo, Scorpio, Capricorn and Pisces were feminine or nocturnal signs.) Therefore, Venus in Virgo is in sect by sign because Virgo is a negative, or feminine, or nocturnal sign;
- a planet might yet have some shred of sect dignity if it is in the hemisphere of the chart corresponding to its inherent sect – for example, if Jupiter is in the same hemisphere as the Sun, whether or not the Sun is above the horizon, or if Venus is in the hemisphere opposite the Sun, whether or not the Sun is below the horizon.

Planets satisfying all three of these sect conditions were said to be Hayz, but it is not clear how Hayz strength compares to strength from essential dignities.
