= Petosiris =

4th century BCE Egyptian high priest

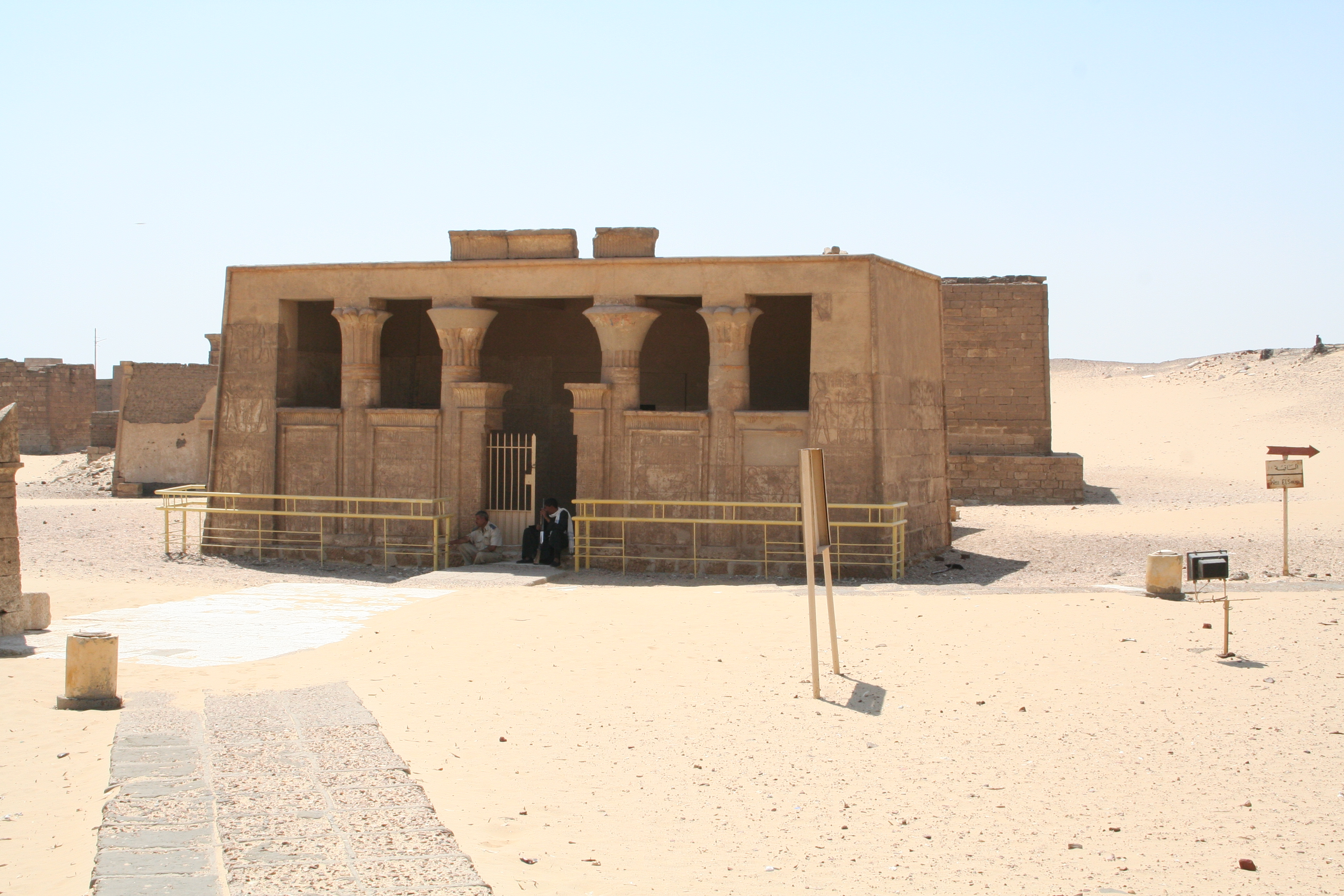
Tomb of Petosiris at Tuna el-Gebel

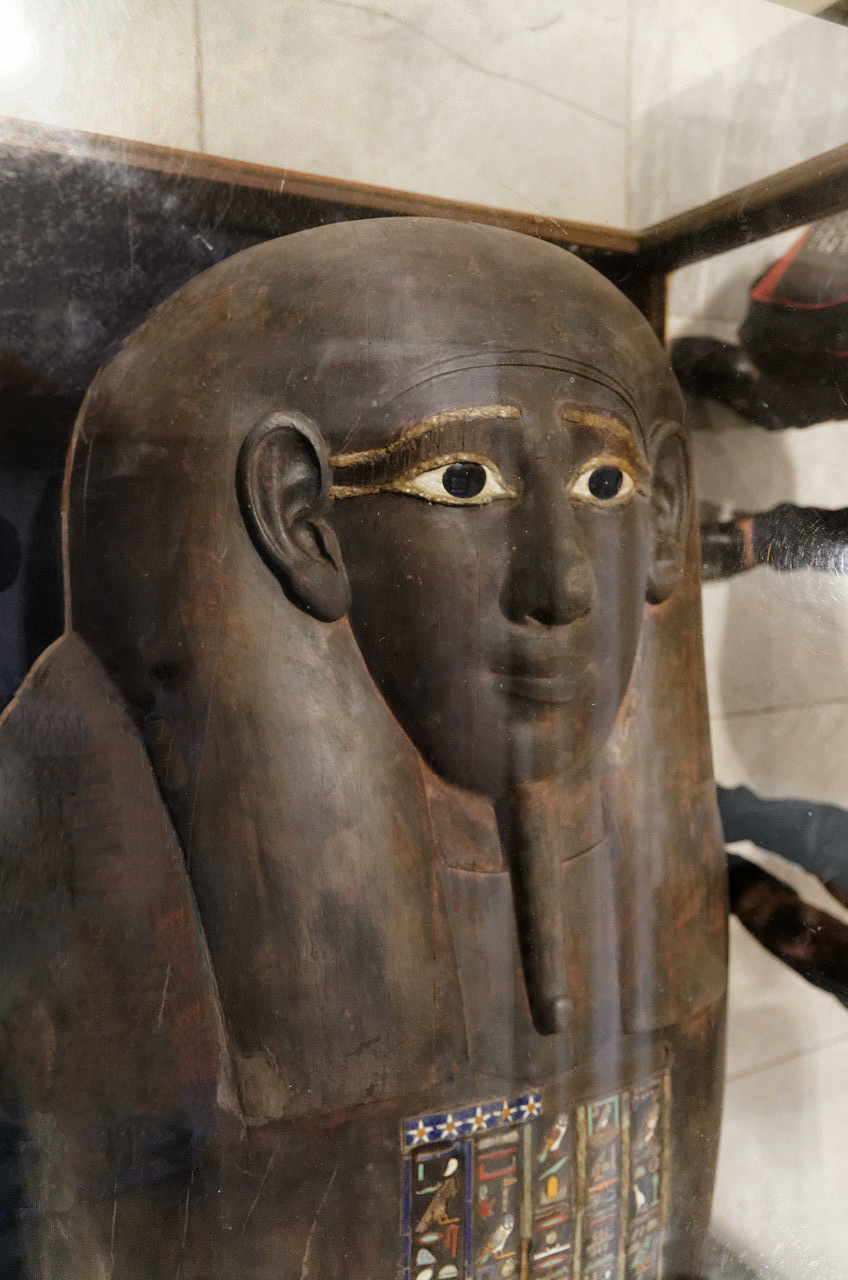
The Coffin of Petosiris in the Egyptian Museum.

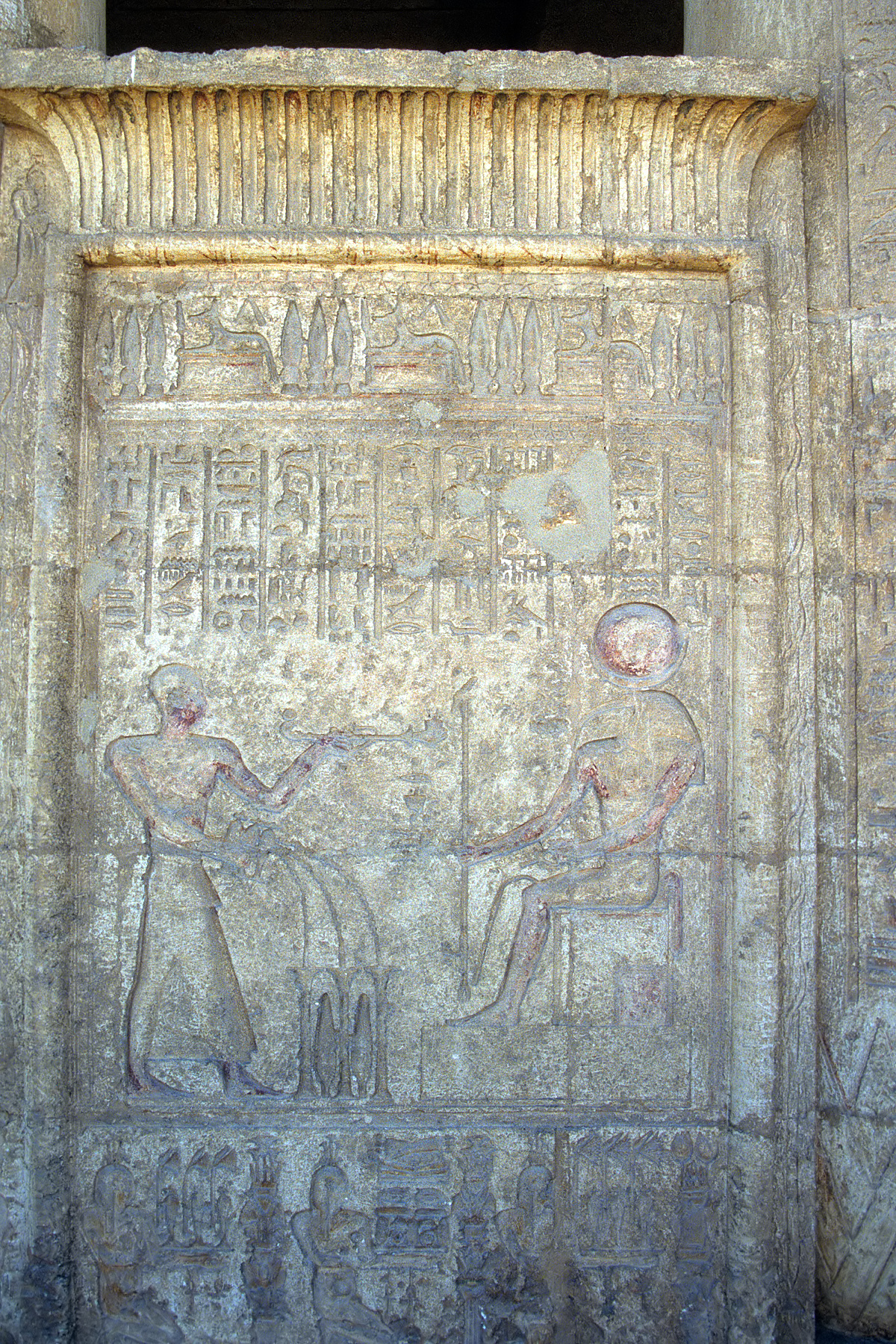
Façade of the tomb of Petosiris (east side) at Tuna el-Gebel

Petosiris (Ancient Greek: Πετόσιρις), called Ankhefenkhons, was the high priest of Thoth at Hermopolis and held various priestly degrees in the service of Sakhmet, Khnum, Amen-Re and Hathor.

Petosiris was the son of Sishu and Nefer-renpet. He lived in the second half of the 4th century BCE, during the 30th Dynasty. In his tomb, located in the necropolis at Tuna el-Gebel, Petosiris prided himself on having re-established the fortunes of the temples in which he served.

There is a pseudepigraphic onomantic text, Petosiris to Nechepso, and it is possible that the priestly Petosiris described in this article is the inspiration for the attribution of authorship. Nechepso lived in the 7th century BCE and the text is likely 2nd century BCE.

== The tomb of Petosiris ==
Petosiris is particularly known for the tomb he had built for himself in Tuna el-Gebel, the necropolis of Hermopolis Magna. The architecture of the tomb is modeled on a temple with a pronaos. The tomb is also known for its depictions of everyday scenes in a mixed Greco-Egyptian style. Greek graffiti proves that the tomb of Petosiris, later venerated as a saint, was visited by the sick in order to be healed. Petosiris's coffin, known for its colorful glass inlays, is now in the Egyptian Museum in Cairo (JE 46592).
