= Vettius Valens =

2nd-century Greek astrologer

Vettius Valens (February 8, 120 – c. 175) was a 2nd-century Hellenistic astrologer, a somewhat younger contemporary of Claudius Ptolemy.

Valens' major work is the Anthology (Latin: Anthologia), ten volumes in Greek written roughly within the period 150 to 175. The Anthology is the longest and most detailed treatise on astrology which has survived from that period. A working professional astrologer, Valens includes over a hundred sample charts from his case files in the Anthology.

== Life ==
Although originally a native of Antioch, he appears to have travelled widely in Egypt in search of specific astrological doctrines to bolster his practice. At the time Alexandria was still home to a number of astrologers of the older Babylonian, Greek and Egyptian traditions. He published much of what he learned from the tradition and through his practice in his Anthology, written in an engaging and instructional style. The Anthology is thus of great value in piecing together actual working techniques of the time.

Vettius claims the source of Egyptian and Phoenician astrological knowledge was Abraham.

Valens' work is also important because he cites the views of a number of earlier authors and authorities, such as Teucer of Babylon, who would otherwise be unknown. The fragments from works attributed to the alleged pharaoh Nechepso and the high priest Petosiris, pseudepigraphal authors of the 2nd century BC, survive mainly through direct quotations in Valens' work.

The three manuscripts of the Anthology all date from 1300 or later. The text, however, appears to be fairly reliable and complete, although disorganized in places.

Although Ptolemy, the astronomer, mathematician, astrologer of ancient Alexandria and author of Tetrabiblos (the most influential astrological text ever written), was generally regarded as the colossus of Hellenistic-period astrology in the many centuries following his death, it is most likely that the actual practical astrology of the period resembled the methods elaborated in Valens' Anthology. Modern scholars tend to counterpoise the two men, since both were roughly contemporary and lived in Alexandria; yet Valens' work elaborated the more practical techniques that arose from ancient tradition, while Ptolemy, very much the scientist, tended to focus more on creating a theoretically consistent model based on his Aristotelian causal framework. The balance given by Valens' Anthology is therefore very instructive. No other Hellenistic author has contributed as much to our understanding of the everyday, practical astrological methods of the early Roman/late Hellenistic era.
