= Dorotheus of Sidon =

Hellenistic astrologer

Dorotheus of Sidon (Ancient Greek: Δωρόθεος Σιδώνιος, c. 75 CE - ?? CE) was a 1st-century Greek astrologer and astrological poet, who, during the Hellenistic Period, wrote a didactic poem on horoscopic astrology in Greek, known as the Pentateuch (Πεντάτευχος; lit. five books; more commonly known in the Western world as Carmen Astrologicum), surviving in Greek fragments and an Arabic translation by Omar Tiberiades.

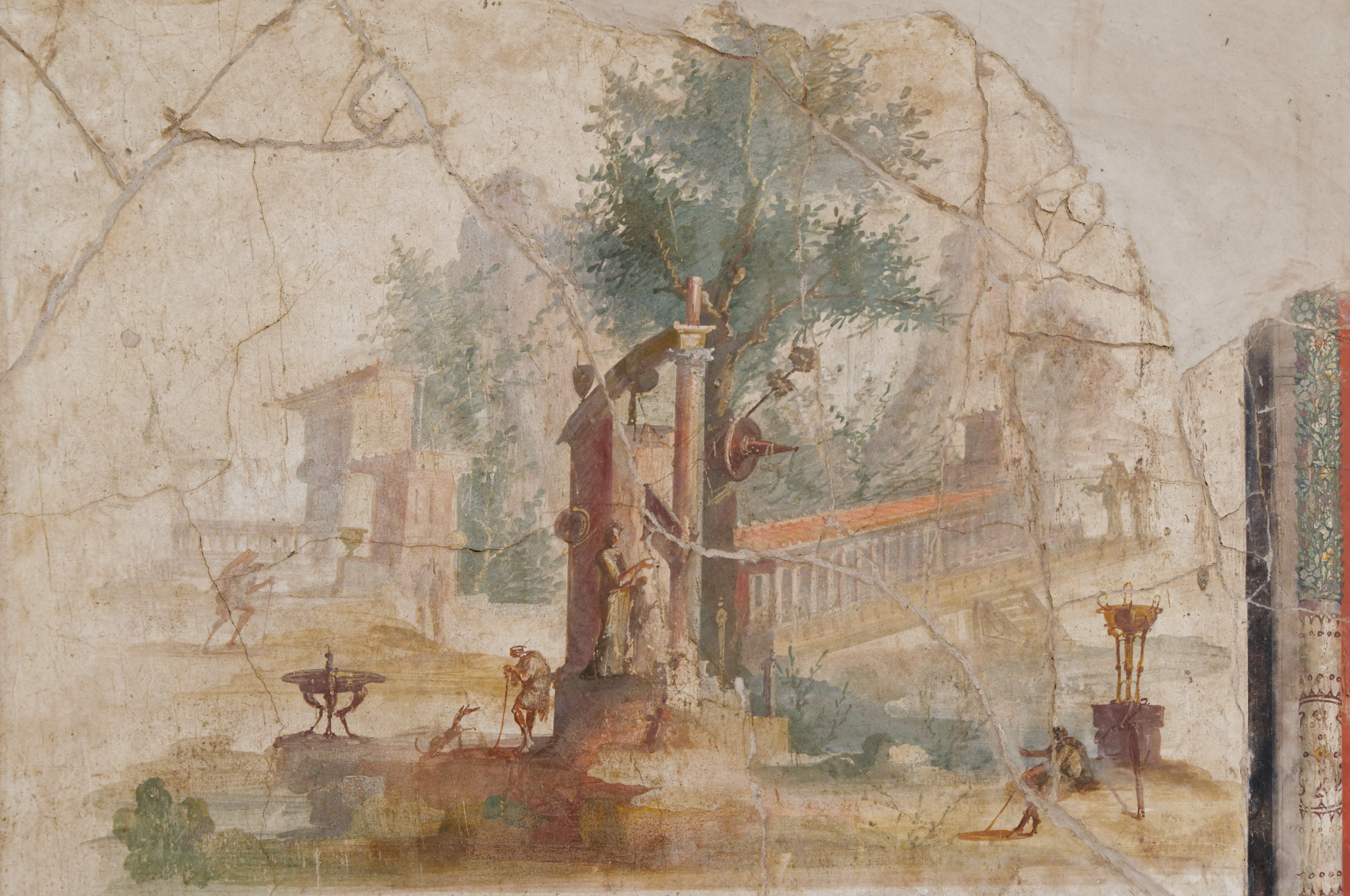
A first century fresco of life in Alexandria, roughly contemporary to Dorotheus

Very little is known about Dorotheus himself. Dorotheus most likely lived and worked in Alexandria, in Egypt, which, in addition to being the most important scholastic center in the Hellenistic world, was also the main location where the oldest Mesopotamian, Greek and Egyptian astrological techniques were synthesized together in order to create horoscopic astrology. According to Firmicus Maternus, Dorotheus was originally a native of the city of Sidon (Firmicus, Mathesis, 2, 29: 2).

== Pentateuch ==
The Pentateuch has come down to us mainly from an Arabic translation dating from around 800 AD carried out by Omar Tiberiades (which has been suggested to be a translation of a Middle Persian translation from the original Greek, although this matter is disputed and it is possible that the Arabic translation was indeed done from an original Greek manuscript). The Arabic text, however, does contain interpolations by later Persian hands, but, nevertheless, remains one of our best sources for the practice of astrology during Hellenistic and Roman times, and it was a work of great influence on later Christian, Persian, Arab and medieval astrologers.

=== Editions & Translations ===
Dorotheus' Pentateuch (Carmen Astrologicum) has been completely translated twice into English, following the surviving Arabic translation:

- Dorothei Sidonii Carmen Astrologicum, ed. and trans. David Pingree, Teubner, Leipzig, 1976 — Critical edition of the Arabic with English translation.
  - Dorotheus of Sidon, Carmen Astrologicum, tr. David Pingree, Ascella Publications, London, 1993 — Republication of Pingree's English translation in the above critical edition.
  - Re-published again by Astrology Classics, Bel Air, MD, 2005
  - The first three books of this translation have been made available by the rights holder online: Book 1, Book 2, Book 3
- Carmen Astrologicum: The 'Umar Al-Tabari Translation, trans. Benjamin N. Dykes, Cazimi Press, 2017

A complete translation into French has been published:

- Carmen Astrologicum Livre 1,2,3,4 et 5, trans. Fabien Waibel, self-published, 2023

An incomplete translation from Greek fragments was made into German in the early 20th century by philologist Viktor Stegemann, based on his 1937 doctoral thesis:

- Die Fragmente des Dorotheos von Sidon, trans. Viktor Stegemann, Heidelberg, Selbstverlag von Bilabel, 1939 (Vol. 1), 1943 (Vol 2.)
