= Sikidy =

Malagasy algebraic divination by seeds

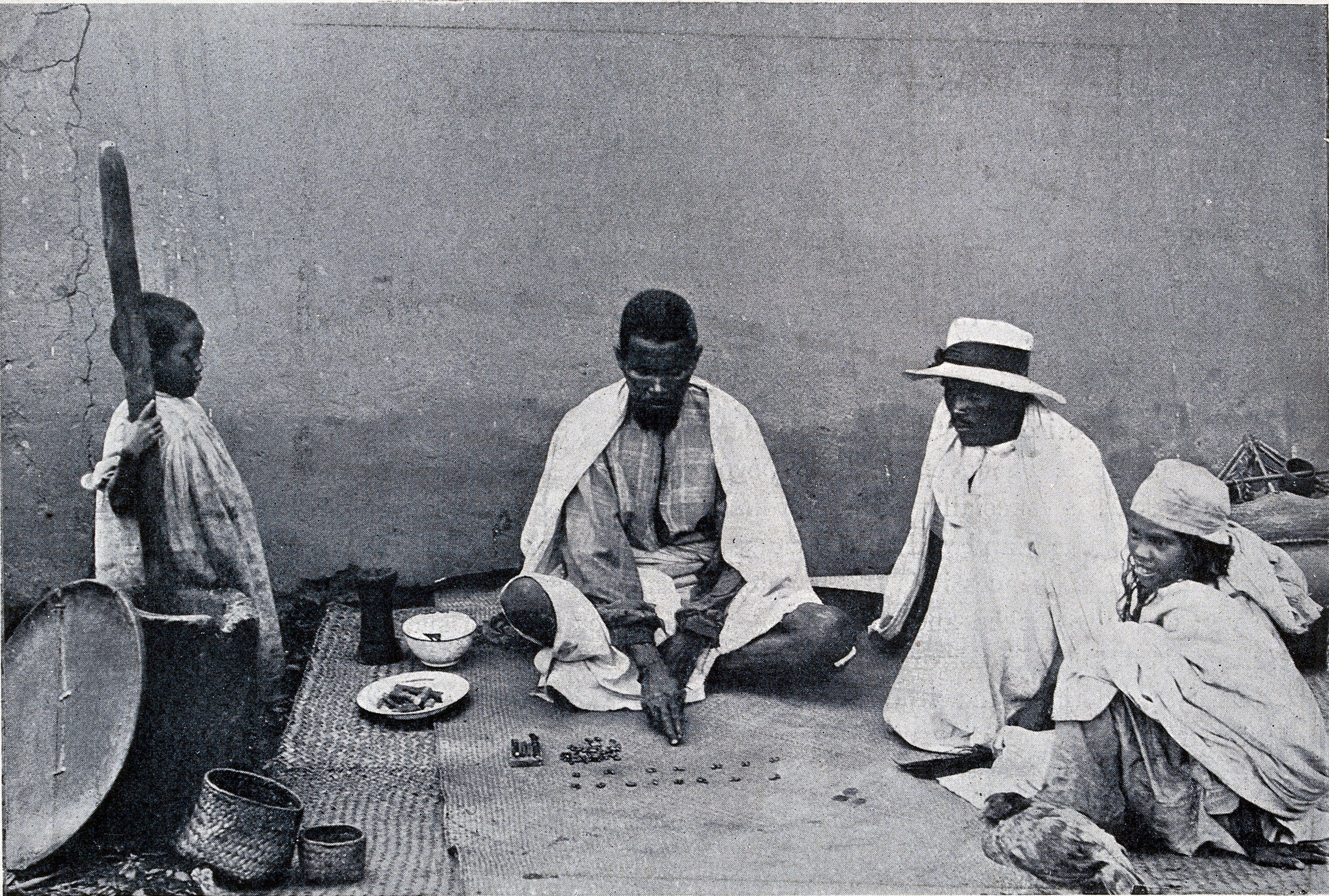
An mpisikidy practices sikidy in 1900

Sikidy (Note: Also sikily (in the southern dialect) and sikiry.) is a form of algebraic geomancy practiced by Malagasy peoples in Madagascar. It involves algorithmic operations performed on random data generated from tree seeds, which are ritually arranged in a tableau called a toetry and divinely interpreted after being mathematically operated on. Columns of seeds, designated "slaves" or "princes" belonging to respective "lands" for each, interact symbolically to express vintana ('fate') in the interpretation of the diviner. The diviner also prescribes solutions to problems and ways to avoid fated misfortune, often involving a sacrifice.

The centuries-old practice derives from Islamic influence brought to the island by medieval Arab traders. The sikidy is consulted for a range of divinatory questions pertaining to fate and the future, including identifying sources of and rectifying misfortune, reading the fate of newborns, and planning annual migrations. The mathematics of sikidy involves Boolean algebra, symbolic logic and parity.

== History ==
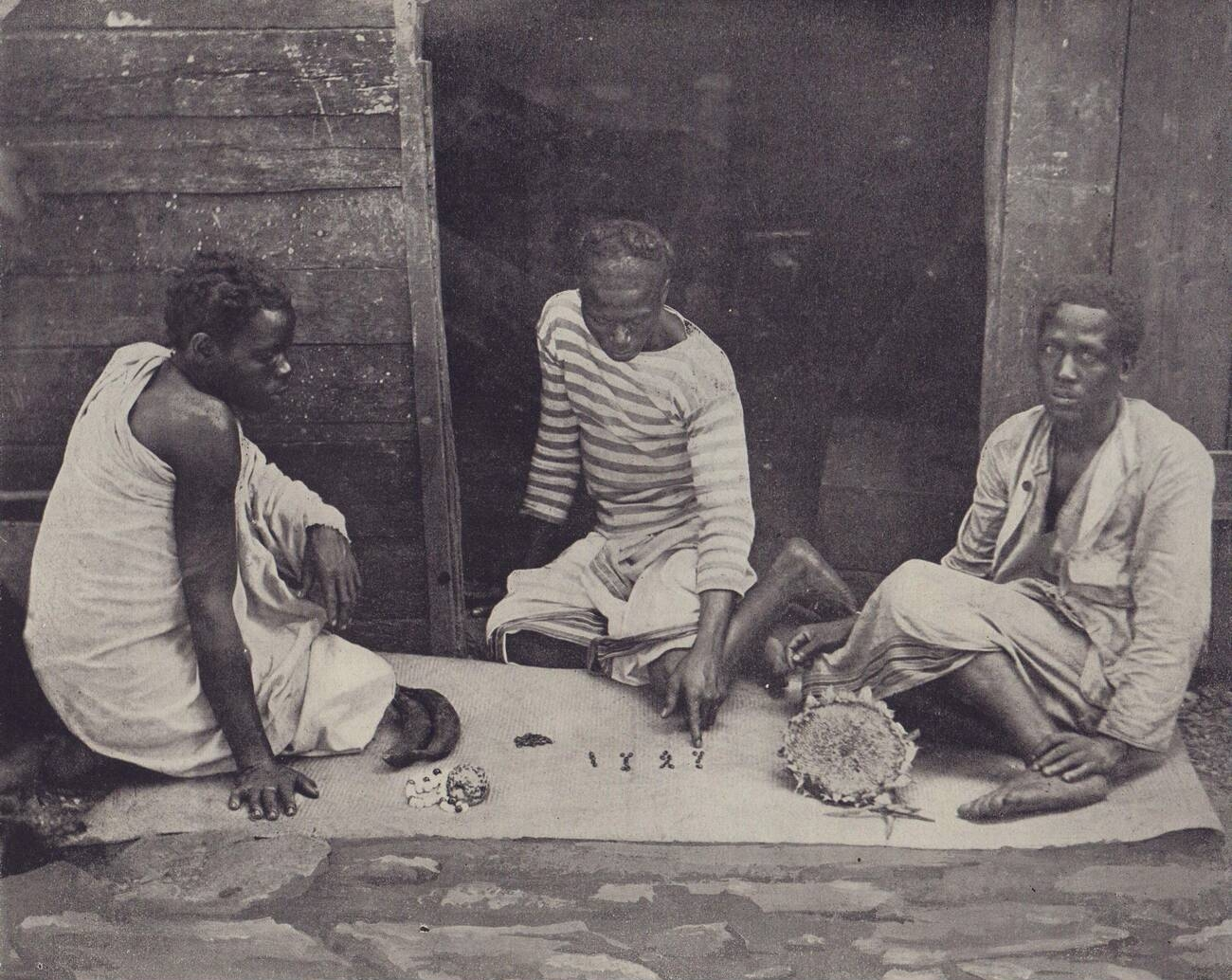
An mpisikidy practices sikidy in 1895

The practice is several centuries old, and is influenced by Arab geomantic traditions of Arab Muslim traders on the island. Most writers link the origins of sikidy to the "sea-going trade involving the southwest coast of India, the Persian Gulf, and the east coast of Africa in the 9th or 10th century C.E." Stephen Ellis and Solofo Randrianja describe sikidy as "probably one of the oldest components of Malagasy culture", writing that it most likely the product of an indigenous divinatory art later influenced by Islamic practice. Umar H. D. Danfulani writes that the integration of Arabic divination into indigenous divination is "clearly demonstrated" in Madagascar, where the Arabic astrological system was adapted to the indigenous agricultural system and meshed with Malagasy lunar months by "adapting indigenous months, volana, to the astrological months, vintana". Danfulani also describes the concepts in sikidy of "houses" (lands) and "kings in their houses" as retained from medieval Arabic astrology. Chemillier et al. say the practice's spread across Madagascar likely originated with the southeastern Antemoro people, among whom Arab influence was the strongest. Though the etymology of sikidy is unknown, it has been posited that the word derives from the Arabic sichr ('incantation' or 'charm').

Sikidy was of central importance to pre-Christian Malagasy religion, with one practitioner quoted in 1892 as calling sikidy "the Bible of our ancestors". A missionary report from 1616 describes one form of sikidy using tamarind seeds, and another using fingered markings in the sand. The early colonial French governor of Madagascar Étienne de Flacourt documented sikidy in the mid-17th century:

Matatane country in southeastern Madagascar [...] where the Antemoro [...] live was a center of astrological study as early as the fourteenth century [...]. This area was also the site of early Arab settlements, although strict Islamic observances were lost centuries ago [...]. Historical evidence shows that Antemoro diviners, bearers of the astrological system, infiltrated nearly all the ancient kingdoms of Madagascar beginning in the sixteenth century. [...] Today, although many persons claim to be ombiasy [diviners], only the Antemoro diviners are considered true professionals. The area is still a famous place of learning where specialists go for training and then return to their home communities with a certain body of knowledge. Now we can better understand the degree of similarity of divination forms found throughout Madagascar. For centuries Matitanana has remained a training center for diviners who have migrated widely, usually attaining important positions in their home communities and with various royal families.

— Étienne de Flacourt, l'Histoire de la Grande Isle Madagascar

Comparison of contemporary rites with centuries-old texts show that sikidy has been remarkably unchanged throughout its history. The "infiltration" of Malagasy kingdoms by Antemoro diviners, and Matitanana's role as a place for astrological and divinatory learning, help to explain the relatively uniform practicing of sikidy across Madagascar. Chemallier et al. write that the mathematical construction of the arrangement of seeds is procedurally consistent across all of Madagascar, with variations in practice between groups and regions being limited to more minor aspects, such as the alignment of figures according to cardinal directions. One exception is the simplified Merina sikidy joria.

=== Origin myths ===
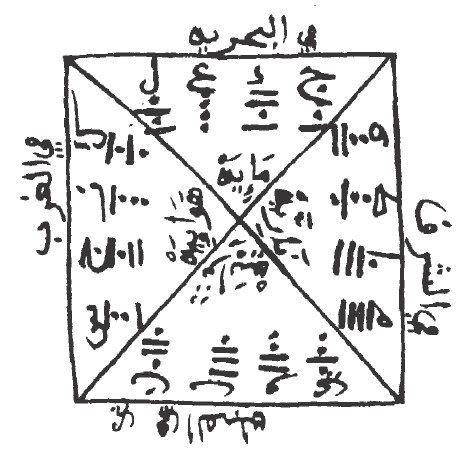
15th century Arabic classification of the geomantic figures

Mythic tradition relating to the origin of sikidy "links [the practice] both to the return by walking on water of Arab ancestors who had intermarried with Malagasy but then left, and to the names of the days of the week" and holds that the art was supernaturally communicated to the ancestors, with Zanahary (the supreme deity of Malagasy religion) giving it to Ranakandriana, who then gave it to a line of diviners (Ranakandriana to Ramanitralanana to Rabibi-andrano to Andriambavi-maitso (who was a woman) to Andriam-bavi-nosy), the last of whom terminated the monopoly by giving it to the people, declaring: "Behold, I give you the sikidy, of which you may inquire what offerings you should present in order to obtain blessings; and what expiation you should make so as to avert evils, when any are ill or under apprehension of some future calamity". A mythic anecdote of Ranakandriana says that two men observed him one day playing in the sand. In fact he was practicing a form of sikidy worked in sand called sikidy alanana. The two men seized him, and Ranakandriana promised that he would teach them something if they released him. They agreed, and Ranakandriana taught them in depth how to work the sikidy. The two men then went to their chief and told him that they could tell him "the past and the future—what was good and what was bad—what increased and what diminished." The chief asked them to tell him how he could obtain plenty of cattle. The two men worked their sikidy and told the chief to kill all of his bulls, and that "great numbers would come to him" on the following Friday. The chieftain, doubting, asked what would happen if their prediction didn't come true, and the two men promised they would pay with their lives. The chief agreed and killed his bulls. On Thursday, thinking he'd been duped, he prematurely killed the first man of the two who'd told him about the divinatory art. On Friday, however, "vast herds" came amidst heavy rain, actually filling an immense plain in their crowd. The chieftain lamented the mpisikidy's wrongful execution and ordered for him a pompous funeral. The chieftain took the second man as his close adviser and friend, and trusted the sikidy forever afterwards. The British missionary William Ellis recorded in 1839 two idiomatic expressions used in Madagascar that come from this story: "Tsy mahandry andro Zoma" (lit. 'He cannot wait 'til Friday') is said of someone extremely impatient, and heavy rainshowers falling in rapid succession are called "sese omby" (lit. 'a crowding together of cattle').

Seed pods of Entada chrysostachys

== Rites and arrangement of seeds ==
The divination is performed by a practitioner called an mpisikidy, ny màsina (lit. 'sacred one'), (Note: Identified by Lars Dahle as a common name for the mpisikidy among the Betsileo and Merina peoples.) ombiasy, or ambiàsa (derived from the Arabic anbia, meaning 'prophet') who guides the client through the process and interprets the results in the context of the client's inquiries and desires. As part of an mpisikidy's formal initiation into the art, which includes a long period of apprenticeship, the initiate (called a mianatsy) must gather 124 and 200 fàno (Entada sp.) or kily (tamarind) tree seeds for his subsequent ritual use in sikidy.

Raymond Decary writes that, at least among the Sakalava, a man must be 40 years old before learning and practicing sikidy, or he risks death. Before beginning to study, a student practitioner must make incisions at the tips of his index finger, his middle finger, and his tongue, and put within the incisions a paste containing red pepper and crushed wasp. This paste impregnates the fingers that will move the seeds of the sikidy and the tongue that will speak their revelations with the power to decipher the sikidy. Once this is done, he leaves at dawn to search for a fano (Entada chrysostachys) tree. Upon finding it, he throws his spear at its branches, shaking the tree and causing its large seed pods to fall. During this act, some initiates say: "When you were on the steep peak and in the dense forest, on you the crabs climbed, from you the crocodiles made their bed, with their paws the birds trod on you. Whether you are suspended in the trees or buried, you are never dried up nor rotten." In his study (written in 1941 and revised in 1948), Decary reported that the salary paid by a mianatsy to his master is "not very high": up to five francs, plus a red rooster's feather.

The mpisikidy ritually arranges his seeds into a sixteen-column table consisting of four columns of randomly-generated data (representing fate) and eight columns of data derived from logical operations meant to decode the random data. This table, called the toetry, is then algorithmically checked for errors before being divinely interpreted.

=== Incantation ===
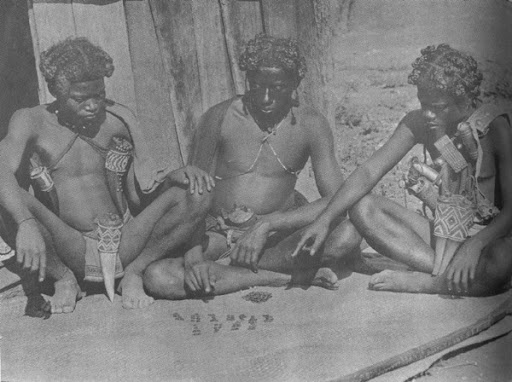
Antandroy diviners

To "awaken" the seeds in his bag as well as his own verbal powers, the mpisikidy incants to the gods or earth spirits in attempt to constrain the gods/spirits to tell the truth, with emphasis on "the trickiness of the communicating entities, who misle[a]d if they [can]", and orates the practice's origin myth. As he incants, the mpisikidy turns the seeds on a mat eastward with his right hand. One Merina incantation quoted by Norwegian missionary Lars Dahle reads:

Awake, O God, to awaken the sun! Awake, O sun, to awaken the cock!

Awake, O cock, to awaken mankind! Awake, O mankind, to awaken the sikidy, not to tell lies, not to deceive, not to play tricks, not to talk nonsense, not to agree to everything indiscriminately; but to search into the secret; to look into what is beyond the hills and on the other side of the forest, to see what no human eye can see. Wake up, for thou art from the long-haired Mohammedans from the high mountains, from [Anakandriananahitra, the almost mythical founder of the art in Madagascar, whose name is followed by those authorities who passed the art on to the people and their present diviners, thereby establishing an historical line of legitimacy] ... Awake! for we have not got thee for nothing, for thou art dear and expensive. We have hired. thee. in exchange for a fat cow With a large hump, and for money on which there was no dust [i.e. good value]. Awake! for thou art the trust of the sovereign [the ruling house of pre-colonial Madagascar used court diviners literally dozens of times a day to decide the advisability of even the most everyday actions, from matters of state to the timing of matters of personal hygiene] and the judgement of the people. If thou art a sikidy that can tell, a sikidy that can see, and does not [only] speak about the noise of the people, the hen killed by its owner, the cattle killed in the market, the dust clinging to the feet [i.e. uninteresting commonplaces], awake here on the mat!

But if thou art a sikidy that does not see, a sikidy that agrees to everything indiscriminately, and makes [false statements, as if] the dead [were] living, and the living dead, then do not arise here on the mat.

When practicing the sikidy, Sakalava diviners work with a fragment of hyaline quartz in front of their seeds, which is set out before the seeds are produced from their sack.

=== Generating the renin-sikidy ===
After his incantation, the mpisikidy takes one or two fistfuls of awakened seeds from his bag and randomly divides the seeds into four piles. Using his index and middle fingers, the mpisikidy removes two at a time from each pile until there is either one seed or two seeds remaining in each. The four remaining "piles" (now either single seeds or pairs) become the first entries in the first column of a toetry (tableau). The process is repeated several (Note: Ascher describes three, Chemillier et al. describe eight) more times, with each new column of seeds being placed on the toetry to the left of the previous. At the end of this, the array consists four randomly-generated columns of four values (each being either one seed or two) each. This array of sixteen binary values is called the renin-sikidy (lit. 'mother-sikidy'). There are 65,536 possible renin-sikidy arrays. (Note: 2^{16}=65,536) From the renin-sikidy data, four additional "columns" are read as the rows across the renin-sikidy's columns, and eight additional columns are generated algorithmically and placed in a specific order below the four original columns.

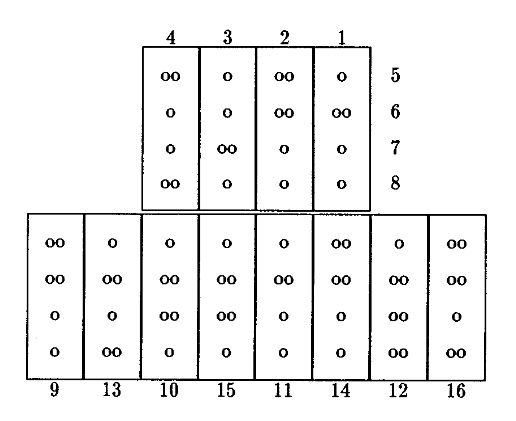
A diagrammed example of a 16-column toetry with a valid arrangement of seeds

=== Algorithmically-generated columns ===
Columns 9–16 of the toetry, referred to as the daughters of the renin-sikidy, are generated using the XOR logical operation ($\oplus$), which determines a value based on whether two other values are the same or different. In sikidy, the XOR operation is used to compare values in sequence across two existing columns and generate corresponding values for a third column: two seeds if the corresponding values are identical across the pair, and one seed if the values are different. The rules for generating a column from the XOR operation are (with o representing one seed, and oo representing two):

$$\begin{align}
o \oplus o &= oo \\
oo \oplus oo &= oo \\
o \oplus oo &= o \\
oo \oplus o &= o
\end{align}$$

The 9th–12th columns are generated algorithmically from pairs of adjacent columns in the randomly-generated renin-sikidy (the four-by-four grid of seeds representing eight datasets across its four columns and four rows). The last four columns (13–16) of the toetry are derived from the algorithmically-generated columns, with column 16 operating on the first and fifteenth column as a pair. Chemillier et al. emphasize that the latter operation represents a new successive generation of daughters to the daughters of the renin-sikidy.

For example, the first value of column 9 is determined by comparing the first values of columns 7 and 8. If they are the same (both one seed or both two seeds), the first value of column 9 will be two seeds. If they are different, the first value of column 9 will be one seed. This operation iterates for each pair of corresponding values in columns 7 and 8, creating a complete set of values for column 9. Column 10 is then generated by applying the XOR operation between the values in columns 5 and 6. Similarly, column 11 is generated from columns 3 and 4, and column 12 from columns 1 and 2.

Columns 13-16 are generated in the same manner, performing the XOR operation on ascending pairs of the algorithmically-generated columns, starting with columns 9 and 10 (to generate column 13) and ending with columns 15 and 1 (to generate column 16).

=== Checks ===
The mpisikidy performs three algorithmic and logical checks to verify the toetry's validity according to its generative logic: one examining the whole toetry, one examining the results of combining some particular columns, and one parity check examining only one column. First, the mpisikidy checks that at least two columns in the toetry are identical. Next, it is ensured that the pairs of columns 13 and 16, 14 and 1, and 11 and 2 (called "the three inseparables" (Note: The pairs of columns 2 and 16, 11 and 13, and 12 and 15 are also called "three inseparables".)) all yield the same result when combined via the XOR operation. Finally, it is checked that there is an even number of seeds in the 15th column—the only column for which parity is logically certain.

Each of these three checks are mathematically proven valid in a 1997 paper by American ethnomathematician Marcia Ascher. Verification through the use of Microsoft Excel was achieved and published by Gomez et al. in 2015.

== Divination ==
Once the mpisikidy has checked the toetry, his analysis and divination can begin. Certain questions and answers rely on additional columns beyond the prepared sixteen. Some of these columns are read spatially in patterns across the existing toetry's data, and some are generated with additional XOR operations referring to pairs of columns within the secondary series. These new columns can involve "about 100 additional algorithms".

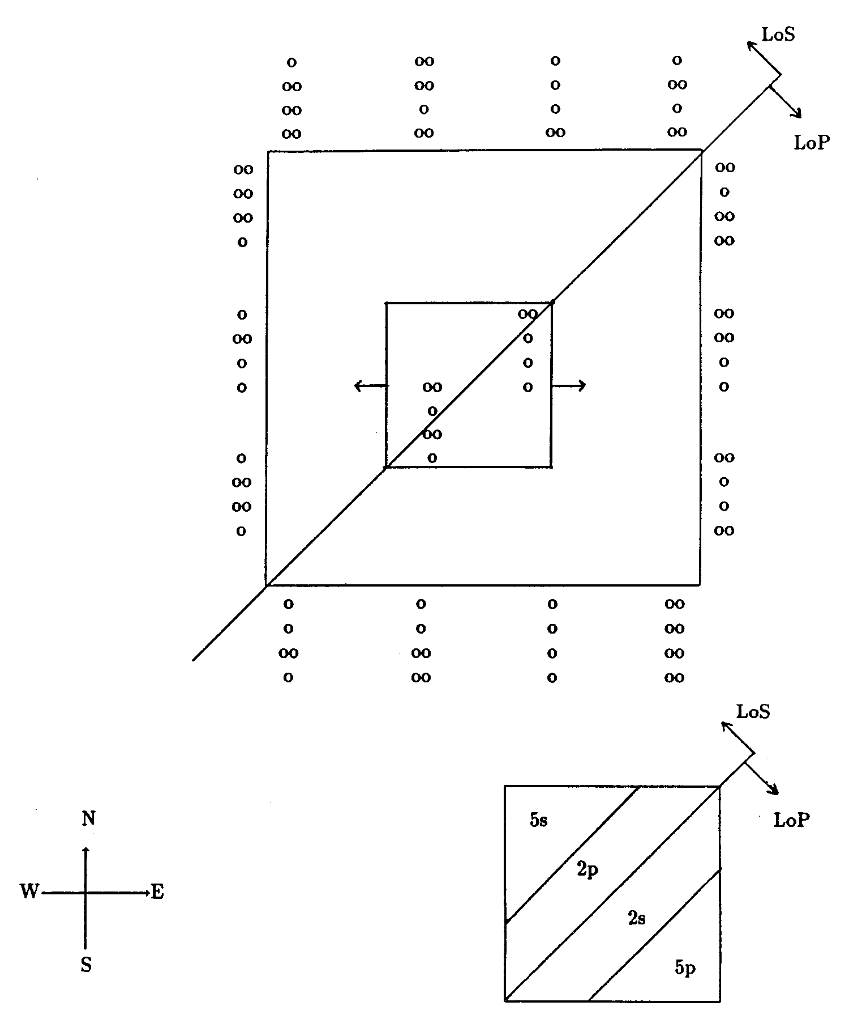
The directional square showing the placements for the sixteen geomantic figures of the sikidy across the Land of Slaves (northwestern half) and the Land of Princes (southeastern half), including the two migrators in the center square, whose positions depend on the time of day.

Each column making up the toetry has a distinct divine referent:

Columns of the toetry and their symbolic meanings
Column number	Malagasy name	Symbolic meaning	Notes
1	Tale	The client or patient	From Arabic طلع talah, meaning 'to rise'.
2	Mady or Maly	Material goods; riches; zebu	From Arabic المال al-mal, meaning 'goodness', 'richness', 'property'.
3	Fahatelo	A male evil-doer (lit. 'the third')	
4	Bilady	The domicile; the country; the Earth	From Arabic بلد bilad, meaning 'country' or 'land'.
5	Fianahana	The fifth child; descendants; children; youth	
6	Abidy or Abily	Slaves	From Arabic عبد abid, meaning 'slaves'.
7	Betsimisay, Betsilisay, or Alisay	The wife of the house	From Arabic بيت beit, meaning 'house', and النساء al-nisaa, meaning 'wife'.
8	Fahavalo	The sorcerer; illness; the enemy (lit. 'the eighth')	
9	Fahasivy	The spirits (lit. 'the ninth')	
10	Omasina or Ombiasa	Nourishment; the healing diviner	From Arabic محسن mihsan or mihsin, meaning 'the beneficient' and 'the generous'
11	Haja	Everything that can be eaten	
12	Haky	The Creator	
13	Sorotany or Solotany	The chiefs and elders	
14	Saily or Saly	The road	
15	Safary or Lalana	The road	
16	Akiba	The house or its inhabitants	

There are sixteen possible configurations of sikidy seeds in each column of four values. These formations are known to the diviner and identified with names, which vary regionally. Some names relate to names of months. For many mpisikidy, the formations are associated with directions. (Note: This relates to Malagasy cultural connotations ascribing values to different directions: the northeast is good, the southwest lacks virtue, and the directions between "vary in religious and moral value". These same associations also prescribe house and tomb orientations, as well as the positioning and orientation of visitors based on social status (with the most important standing to the northeast and the least important to the southwest).) The eight formations with an even number of seeds are designated as "princes", while the eight with an odd number of seeds are "slaves". Each slave and prince has its place in a square whose sides are associated with the four cardinal directions. The square is divided into a northwestern "Land of Slaves" and a southeastern "Land of Princes" by a diagonal line extending from its northeastern corner to its southeastern corner. Despite their names, each "Land" contains both slaves and princes, including one migrating prince and one migrating slave that move directionally with the sun, such that the migrators belong to different lands depending on the time of day at which the sikidy is performed. The migrators are in the east from sunrise to 10 AM, in the north from 10 AM to 3 PM, and in the west from 3 PM to sunset. Sikidy is never performed at night, and thus the migrators are never in the south. (Note: Some diviners associate migrators with the west regardless of time.)

The power to see into the past or future is greater in toetry in which all four directions are represented, and most powerful in toetry with four directions represented but with one direction having only one representative. These toetry are called tokan-sikidy ('sikidy-unique'). Beyond being powerful arrangements for divination, tokan-sikidy represent a particular abstract interest to mpisikidy, who seek to understand them and the data which generate them as an unsolved intellectual challenge. Knowing many tokan-sikidy leads to personal prestige for the mpisikidy, with discovered examples being posted on doors and spread among diviners by word of mouth.

Divination of the sikidy refer to hierarchies of power relating to position and class of figures. "Princes are more powerful than slaves; figures from the Land of Princes are more powerful than those from the Land of Slaves; slaves from the same land are never harmful to one another; and battles between two princes from the Land of Princes are always serious but never end in death."

In divinations relating to illness, the client and creator columns being the same indicates that there will definitely be recovery; if the client and ancestors columns are the same, the illness is due to some discontent on the part of the ancestors; and if the client and house columns are the same, the illness is the same as one that has previously ended in recovery. The relationship between the client and spirit columns is directly referent to illness. If the client is a slave of the east and the spirit is a prince of the south, the client is dominated by the illness, and thus the illness is divined to be serious—but not fatal, because both the east and the south are in the Land of Princes. If the client is a prince of the north (in the Land of Slaves), and the spirit a prince of the south (in the Land of Princes), there would be a difficult battle with a significant chance of the client dying.

If the ninth and fifteenth columns are the same, a bead must be offered as a sōrona, called vakantsileondoza (lit. 'overcoming the calamity'). If the first and fourth are the same, then a piece of a tree that grows in the villages (not in the fields) must be offered. If the values of the tenth and fifteenth columns added together and subtracted by two equal the values of the first, a stone (called vato-tsi-very, lit. 'stone-not-lost') is thrown, retrieved, and carefully preserved by a friend or relation, and so not lost.

The most exceptionally hopeless and severe outcome in a toetry is each value in the first four columns (and thus in the entire tableau) being two seeds. This is called the "red sikidy".

A study computer-simulating the algorithmic generation and objective initial interpretation (according to Sakalava tradition) of the 65,536 possible arrangements of sikidy found that, assuming a male client and an inquiry about an illness' cause, the divined cause of illness would be sorcery 21.1% of the time, witchcraft 16.5% of the time, haky (Note: A term which "covers such ideas as spirit possession, god, feature of nature, and surprise." Gardenier observes that "if there is any reason to let it stand for spirit possession, the other possibilities are ignored".) for 9.6%, the village chief for 2.6%, the contamination of food with dirt (which may involve carelessness or evil intentions) for .8%, ancestors for .7%, and undetermined for 48.7%.

=== Figures ===
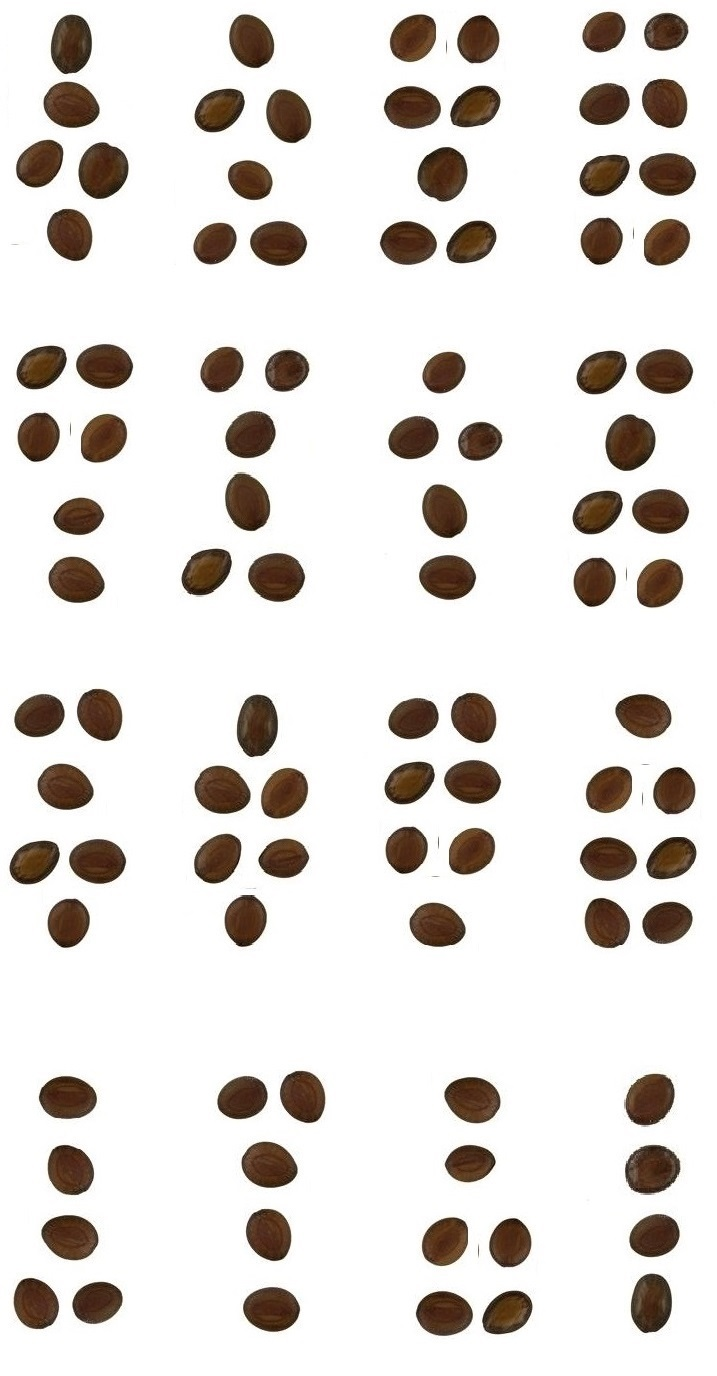
The sixteen geomantic figures of the sikidy, arranged from seeds of the fàno (Entada africana) tree

The following are the most common names and meanings for the sixteen geomantic figures of the sikidy. Names that also refer to lunar months are marked with a '☾'.

Figure	Malagasy name	Meaning
	Taraiky	Emaciation; path, road
	Karija	Slave; cool speech
	Alakaosy ☾	Child; evil thoughts
	Adabara	Zanahary; most sacred
	Alikasajy	Charm; mourning
	Alahijana	Woman; death
	Alikisy	Earth; auspicious
	Asombola ☾	Abundance
	Alohotsy ☾	Money; unhappiness, misfortune
	Adalo ☾	Chief or child; tears
	Alatsimay	Slave; evil thoughts
	Alokola	House; food
	Alabiavo	Water spirit; joy
	Alahamora	Diviner; crowd, mob; grief, trouble
	Alahasady ☾	Food; anger, wrath
	Alakarabo ☾	Robbers, rogues; unhappiness, misfortune

== Occasions and questions for sikidy ==
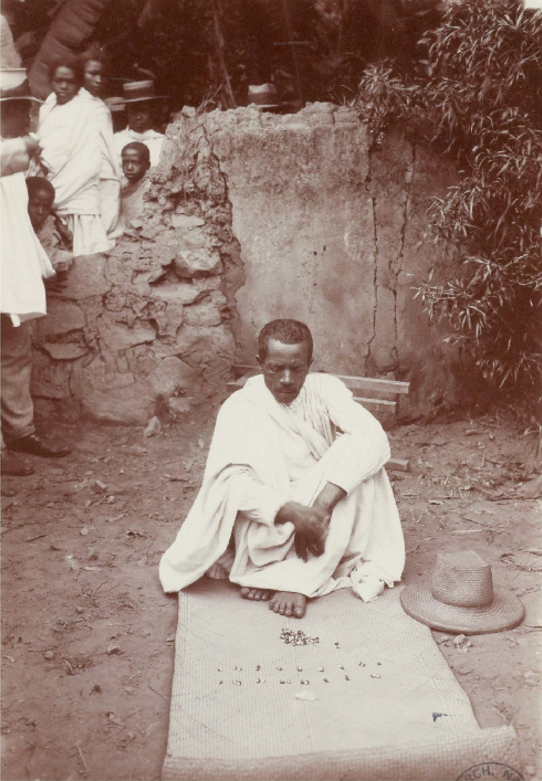
An mpisikidy c. 1900–1905

Problems and questions for divined resolution via sikidy include the selection of a day on which to do something (including taking a trip, planting, a wedding, and the exhumation of ancestral corpses), whether a newborn child's destiny is compatible with its parents and thus whether it ought to be cared for by another family, the finding of a spouse, the finding of lost objects, the identification of a thief, and the explanation for a misfortune, including illness or sterility.

Raymond Decary writes that the sikidy is consulted "in all circumstances", but especially:

1. In cases of illness, which are understood to be either punishments or warnings from supernatural powers due to the transgression of a fady (taboo), or poisonings or curses (called tolaka) from other humans.
2. Before undertaking a journey, in order to divine an auspicious day for travel.
3. To acquire wealth or foresee the growth of herds (gold prospecting and panning must take place on a day selected by the sikidy).
4. For all questions relating to women, including whether a potential bride has a fate aligned with her suitor's.
5. In order to cast a bad spell on someone.
6. To search for or track down thieves.

The kind and color of sheep to be sacrificed in a wedding procession is also divined by sikidy. Among the forest-dwelling Mikea people, sikidy is used "to direct the timing of residential movements to the forest (mihemotse)".

William Ellis describes two ritual occasions for sikidy relating to infants: the declaring of the child's destiny, and the "scrambling" ceremony.

As one of the "first acts" following a child's birth, the child's father or close relative consults the local mpisikidy, who works the sikidy in order to read the child's destiny. When a child's destiny is declared to be favorable, "the child is nurtured with that tenderness and affection which nature inspires, and the warmest gratulations are tendered by the friends of the parents."

The "scrambling" ceremony, which only occurs with firstborn infants, takes place two or three months after the child's birth on a day divined by the sikidy to be lucky or good. The child's friends and family gather, and the child's mother is decorated with silver chains on her head. If the infant is a boy, the father carries him, along with some ripe bananas, on his back. In a rice pan, a mixture is cooked, consisting of the fat from a zebu ox's hump, rice, milk, honey, and a grass called voampamoa. One lock, called the sonia ratsy ('evil lock') is cut from the left side of the child's head and thrown away, "in order to avert calamity". A second lock, called the sonia soa ('the fortunate lock'), is cut from the right side, and added to the mixture in the rice pan. The mélange is mixed well and held up in its pan by the youngest girl of the family, at which point the gathered (especially the women) make a rush for its contents. It is believed that those who obtain a portion of the mixture are bound to become mothers. The scramble also takes place with bananas, lemons, and sugarcane. The rice pan is then considered sacred, and cannot be removed from the house for three days, "otherwise the virtue of those observances is supposed to be lost".

Austrian traveler Ida Laura Pfeiffer recounts in her 1856–1858 Madagascar travelogue that newborns whose hour of birth was deemed misfortunate by consultation of the sikidy were placed in the middle of a road and observed while herds of cattle passed over them. If the cattle were careful and left the child unharmed, the misfortune was considered broken. Most children subjected to this ordeal were killed by the herds, and parents who were unwilling to enact the test "turned [the children] adrift, especially if they were girls, and took no more trouble about them." According to Pfeiffer, Queen of Madagascar Ranavalona I abolished both the test and the abandonment of children so condemned by the sikidy. Pfeiffer called the ban "perhaps the only humane law [Ranavalona] has passed in her entire life."

Pfeiffer also wrote that all travelers to Madagascar who wished to visit the capital, Antananarivo, had to write the Queen for permission and await the decision of the sikidy to assign a day and hour for the traveler's arrival. Pfeiffer and Joseph-François Lambert reportedly declined an invitation to a ritual bullfight in Ambatomango in order to arrive to Antananarivo at the time prescribed by the sikidy. Pfeiffer wrote that more than 12 mpisikidy were employed in the Merina royal court. Pfeiffer wrote that Ranavalona's belief in the sikidy was so strong that it made her "the greatest slave in the country she governs so despotically."

=== Faditra and sōrona ===
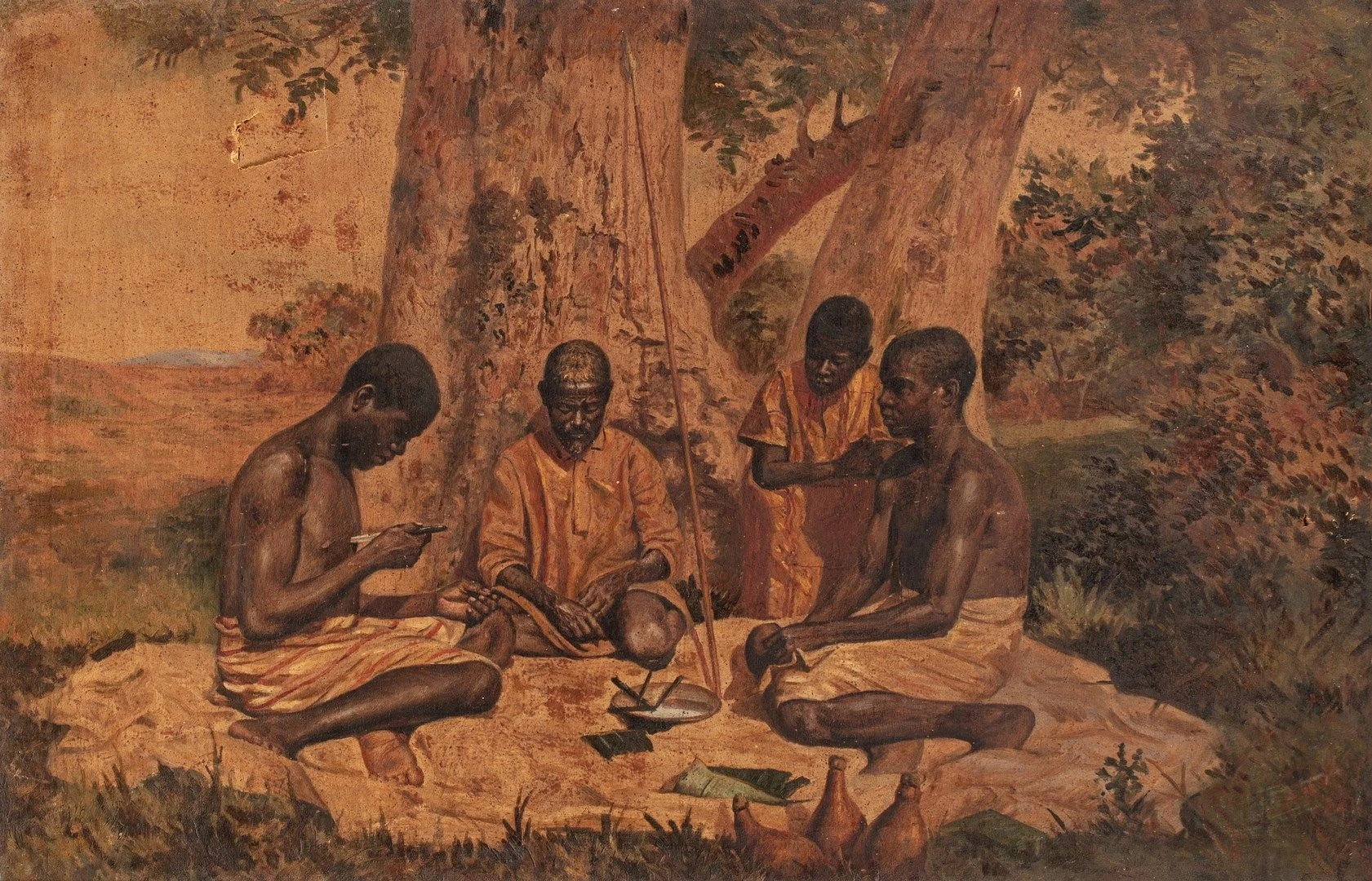
1913 painting by Henri Ratovo depicting the ceremony of the fati-drà (faditra)

Mpisikidy also provide guidance on how to avoid the misfortune divined in the subject's fate. Solutions include offerings, sacrifices, charms (called ody), stored remedies, or observed fady (taboos). The resolution often comes in the form of the ritual disposal of a symbolic object of misfortune, called the faditra: (Note: also fàtidra) for example, if the sikidy predicts the death of two men, then two locusts should be killed and thrown away as the faditra. William Ellis compares this practice to the ancient Jewish scapegoat. Other faditra objects can be trivial, such as "a little grass", some earth, or the water with which the patient rinses his mouth. If the faditra is ashes, they are blown from the hand to be carried off by the wind; if it is cut money, it is thrown to the bottom of deep waters; if a sheep, it is "carried away to a distance on the shoulders of a man, who runs with all his might, mumbling as he goes, as if in the greatest rage against the faditra, for the evils it is bearing away." If it is a pumpkin, it is carried away a short distance and then thrown on the ground with fury and indignation. The disposal of a faditra may be as simple as a man standing at his doorway, throwing the object a few feet away, and saying the word "faditra". Ellis reports the following faditra for various sources and manifestations of evil:

Evil's origin	Faditra
Heaven	An herb called tsikobon-danitra (Portulaca oleracea)
The earth	A water-flower
Cattle	A grasshopper called tsiavaramonina
Sheep	A small fish called ondrindrano, lit. 'water-sheep'
Money	A grasshopper called tsimbolavola
The mouth; speaking	The mouth or brim of a small basket
The north	A tree called tsiavaramonina, lit. 'not residing northward'
The south	An herb called antsiontsiona
The west	A rush called harefo
The east	An herb called anantsinahy
Fire	A red flower called songo songo (Euphorbia splendens)
Tsingy (the reproach or blame of parents or friends)	A broken fragment of the sing (water vessel)

Foretold danger or misfortune	Faditra
Sickness	A piece of a tree that has been injured by accident, cutting, or maiming (hazomarary, lit. 'sick-tree')
Death	An object without life; or a piece of a stone, especially granite, in incipient degradation (vato maty, lit. 'dead-stone')
Partial danger of witchcraft (some person's partial inclination to bewitch the offerer)	The kernel or gland in a bullock's fat, called the mosavin-kena, lit. 'bewitching meat'
Danger from persons collecting together (foretells burial)	A grass called ahidratsy or atobahoaka, together with some earth, thrown away from a point measured eight to ten feet away

A divine offering, called a sōrona, is also prescribed by the mpisikidy. The sōrona may consist of a combination of beads, silver chains, ornaments, meats, herbs, and the singing of a child. Other sōrona objects include "a young bullock which just begins to bellow and to tear up the earth with his horns", fowl, rice mixed with milk and honey, a plantain tree flush with fruit, "slime from frogs floating on the water", and a groundnut called voanjo. Sōrona amulets and bracelets may continue to be worn after the cause of their prescription, effectively becoming ody.

Recovery without adherence to divined prescription and faditra is believed "almost impossible". William Ellis recorded in 1838 that, though the application of indigenous remedies was most common, some patients had lately been instructed as part of the sikidy resolution to ask the local foreign missionaries for medicine.

== Mpisikidy ==
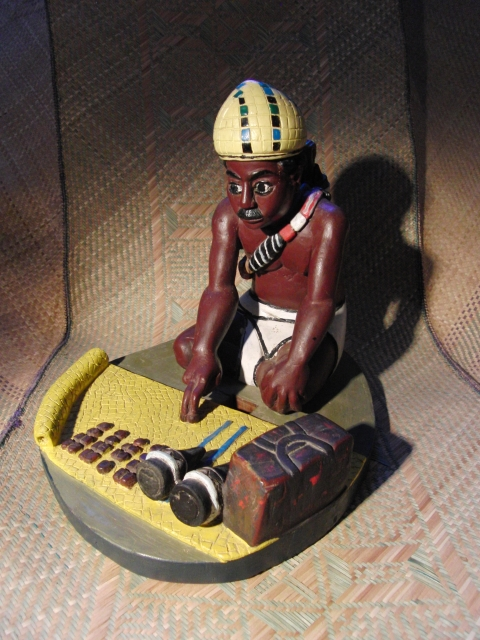
A figurine depicting an mpisikidy, with sikidy seeds and other magical objects

Some mpisikidy are considered specialists, dealing only with areas of inquiry and resolution within their expertise. In the process of divination, the mpisikidy relates interactively to the client, asking new questions and discussing the interpretation of the seeds. Alfred Grandidier estimated in the late 19th century that roughly one in three Malagasy people had a firm grasp on the art; by 1970 Raymond Decary wrote that the number of mpisikidy was now more limited, and the common knowledge of how to operate and read the sikidy was now more basic, with masters of sikidy becoming more rare. Chemillier et al. wrote in 2007 that most Malagasy people generally understand the rules of the sikidy, even if they are not themselves mpisikidy. Despite this, non-practitioners generally claim not to know the art, and those learned of sikidy generally still claim 'not to know' in the presence of a more senior practitioner. Men younger than 40 are rarely considered knowledgeable of sikidy. Mpisikidy can develop reputations for their knowledge and ascend in the imprecise hierarchy of mastery, including the miantasy (apprentice), the mpisikidy, the tena mahay ('true connoisseur'), the ombiasabe ('great ombiasa'), andrarangy ('at the top of'), and the sefon-tsikily ('chief of sikidy').

A 2007 study found that mpisikidy were significantly faster than non-diviners at visually recognizing the parity (to distinguish between princes and slaves) of sikidy figures. The study also showed that the mpisikidy more quickly recognized the parity of symmetrical figures than of non-symmetrical ones.

=== Anthropology ===
Chemillier et al. posit that the complexity and faithful oral transmission of the sikidy process may be explained as a way to assert the authority and seriousness of mpisikidy. This socially validates the sikidy as a serious mystical practice, even as its ability to predict and prescribe is not experimentally verifiable.

== Related traditions ==
Other Malagasy methods of divination include astrology, cartomancy, ornithomancy, extispicy, and necromantic dream-interpretation.

=== African sixteen-figure divinatory traditions ===
Aside from Arabic geomancy, a number of African divination methods using sixteen basic figures have been studied, including Yoruba Ifá cowrie-shell divination, also known by its Fon name Fa and the Ewe and Igbo name Afa. African diasporic populations in Latin America have retained the practice, with the tradition being called Ifa among Afro-Cubans, Afro-Brazilians, and Afro-Haitians. Umar H. D. Danfulani records a breadth of sixteen-figure divinatory traditions across Africa:

- Ifá – from Yoruba culture
- Fa – from Fon culture; same tradition as Ifá
- Afa – from Igbo and Ewe cultures; same tradition as Ifá
- Pa; Pe – from Chadic speakers of the Jos Plateau
- Noko – from Jukun and Kuteb cultures
- Eba – from Ekoi culture
- Agbigba – from Igbira and Okun cultures
- Efa – from Ekoi culture
- Eva – from Isoko culture
- Ominigbon; Ogwega; Iha Ogwega – from Bini (Edo) culture
- Hakata – "from Zaire and Angola to South Africa"; "bone casting/throwing"; originating from the court circles of Mwene Mutapa (present-day Zimbabwe) and "in the southern Congo river-basin empires"
- Sikidy – from Malagasy culture

== See also ==
- I Ching
