= Rubeus =

Rubeus may refer to:

- Rubeus (geomancy), a geomantic figure
- Rubeus Hagrid, a fictional half-wizard, half-giant serving as a Hogwarts teacher in the Harry Potter series
- Crimson Rubeus, a fictional character in the Sailor Moon series
