= Favomancy =

Fortune-telling method

Favomancy is a form of divination that involves throwing beans on the ground and interpreting the patterns into which the beans fall; it is therefore a type of cleromancy. Various forms of favomancy are present across the world's cultures. The term comes from the Vicia faba meaning Fava bean, and by way of cult etymology, from the Latin faba for "bean" and formed by analogy with the names of similar divination methods such as alectromancy.

Favomancy used to be practised by seers in Russia, in particular, among the Ubykh. Russian methods of favomancy may still exist after the departure of the Ubykhs from the Caucasus in 1864, but the details are now lost of exactly how Ubykh soothsayers interpreted the patterns formed by the beans. The Ubykh term for a favomancer (pxażayš’) simply means "bean-thrower", and it later became a synonym for all soothsayers and seers in general in that language.

In Muslim and Serbian traditions of Bosnia and Herzegovina, favomancy is called bacanje graha 'bean-throwing' or falanje (from Persian fal 'to bode'). The fortune-teller places 41 white beans onto a flat surface, dividing them into smaller groups using a complex set of rules. The resulting number of beans in each group is then interpreted as a favorable or unfavorable sign for the different aspects of life represented by each of the groups.

Both Russian and Bosnian methods are remarkably similar, and likely share a common origin. Since the method is not present in the West, it is possible that the origin might be in the Middle East. A similar method exists in Iran, involving 53 peas. Another similar method by the name of kumalak exists across Asia, and like the Bosnian method, also involves 41 beans, or other objects.
