= Miscellaneous Symbols Supplement =

- Range: U+1CEC0..U+1CEFF (64 code points)
- Plane: SMP
- Scripts: Common
- Assigned: 53 code points
- Unused: 11 reserved code points

Unicode Version History
- 17.0 (2025): 34 (+34)
- 18.0 (2026): 53 (+19)

Unicode documentation
- Code chart ∣ Web page

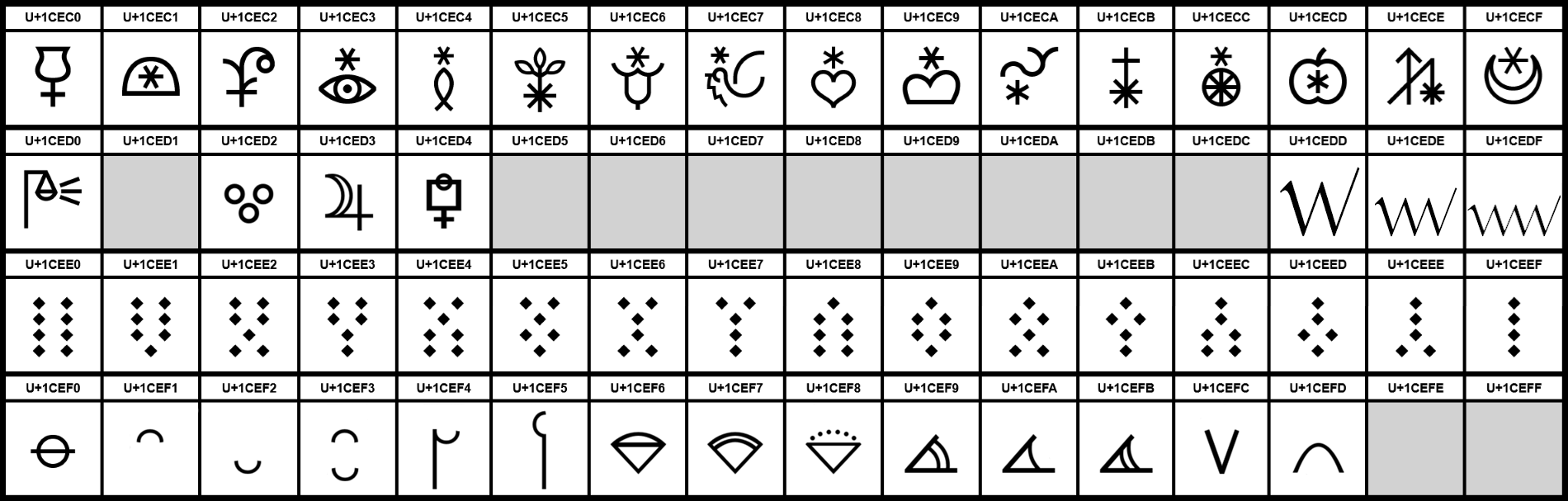
Graphical representation of the Miscellaneous Symbols Supplement Unicode block

Miscellaneous Symbols Supplement is a Unicode block containing a variety of symbols: astronomical symbols, geomantic figures, and one standard state chemical symbol.

== Block ==
Miscellaneous Symbols Supplement^{[1]}^{[2]} Official Unicode Consortium code chart (PDF)
	0	1	2	3	4	5	6	7	8	9	A	B	C	D	E	F
U+1CECx	𜻀	𜻁	𜻂	𜻃	𜻄	𜻅	𜻆	𜻇	𜻈	𜻉	𜻊	𜻋	𜻌	𜻍	𜻎	𜻏
U+1CEDx	𜻐		𜻒	𜻓	𜻔									𜻝	𜻞	𜻟
U+1CEEx	𜻠	𜻡	𜻢	𜻣	𜻤	𜻥	𜻦	𜻧	𜻨	𜻩	𜻪	𜻫	𜻬	𜻭	𜻮	𜻯
U+1CEFx	𜻰	𜻱	𜻲	𜻳	𜻴	𜻵	𜻶	𜻷	𜻸	𜻹	𜻺	𜻻	𜻼	𜻽		
Notes 1.As of Unicode version 18.0 2.Grey areas indicate non-assigned code points

== History ==
The following Unicode-related documents record the purpose and process of defining specific characters in the Miscellaneous Symbols Supplement block:

Version	Final code points (Note: Proposed code points and characters names may differ from final code points and names)	Count	L2 ID	WG2 ID	Document
17.0	U+1CEC0..1CED0	17	L2/23-207		Bala, Gavin Jared; Miller, Kirk (2023-09-18), Unicode request for historical asteroid symbols
17.0	U+1CEC0..1CED0	17	L2/23-238R		Anderson, Deborah; Kučera, Jan; Whistler, Ken; Pournader, Roozbeh; Constable, Peter (2023-11-01), "11 Symbols: Asteroid symbols", Recommendations to UTC #177 November 2023 on Script Proposals
17.0	U+1CEC0..1CED0	17	L2/23-231		Constable, Peter (2023-12-08), "Section 11", UTC #177 Minutes
17.0	U+1CEE0..1CEEF	16	L2/23-218		Pollard, George (2023-09-04), Proposal to encode Geomantic Figures
17.0	U+1CEE0..1CEEF	16	L2/23-238R		Anderson, Deborah; Kučera, Jan; Whistler, Ken; Pournader, Roozbeh; Constable, Peter (2023-11-01), "13 Symbols", Recommendations to UTC #177 November 2023 on Script Proposals
17.0	U+1CEE0..1CEEF	16	L2/23-231		Constable, Peter (2023-12-08), "Consensus 177-C34", UTC #177 Minutes
17.0	U+1CEF0	1	L2/23-193		Soiffer, Neil; Sargent, Murray; Freytag, Asmus (2023-07-20), Five symbols used in chemistry
17.0	U+1CEF0	1	L2/23-193R		Soiffer, Neil; Sargent, Murray; Freytag, Asmus (2023-07-26), Proposal for Ten Chemical Symbols
17.0	U+1CEF0	1	L2/23-193R2		Soiffer, Neil; Sargent, Murray; Freytag, Asmus (2023-10-20), Proposal for Ten Chemical Symbols
17.0	U+1CEF0	1	L2/23-238R		Anderson, Deborah; Kučera, Jan; Whistler, Ken; Pournader, Roozbeh; Constable, Peter (2023-11-01), "12 Symbols", Recommendations to UTC #177 November 2023 on Script Proposals
17.0	U+1CEF0	1	L2/23-231		Constable, Peter (2023-12-08), "Consensus 177-C33", UTC #177 Minutes
17.0	U+1CEF0	1	L2/24-006		Constable, Peter (2024-01-31), "Consensus 178-C32", UTC #178 Minutes
18.0	U+1CED2..1CED4	3	L2/25-131		Mayer, Uwe; et al. (2024-09-03), Proposal to encode 7 historic alchemical symbols
18.0	U+1CED2..1CED4	3	L2/25-091R		Kučera, Jan; et al. (2025-04-22), "5.15 Leibniz", Recommendations to UTC #183 (April 2025) on Script Proposals
18.0	U+1CED2..1CED4	3		N5332	Mayer, Uwe; et al. (2025-05-07), Proposal to encode historic alchemical symbols
18.0	U+1CED2..1CED4	3		N5332R	Mayer, Uwe; et al. (2025-11-25), Proposal to encode historic alchemical symbols
18.0	U+1CED2..1CED4	3	L2/26-054R2		Anderson, Debbie; Constable, Peter (2026-01-22), "1. Alchemical Symbols", Proposed Leibniz additions for Unicode 18.0
18.0	U+1CED2..1CED4	3	L2/26-063		Leroy, Robin (2026-01-29), U+1CED4: tartar-salt or salt of tartar?
18.0	U+1CED2..1CED4	3	L2/26-003		"Consensus 186-C30 (accept 3 characters) and 186-C36 (change name of U+1CED4)", UTC #186 Minutes, 2026-02-01
18.0	U+1CEDD..1CEDF	3	L2/24-244		Mayer, Uwe; et al. (2024-09-17), Proposal to encode 11 cossic characters
18.0	U+1CEDD..1CEDF	3	L2/24-228		Kučera, Jan; et al. (2024-11-01), "3.5 Cossic characters", Recommendations to UTC #181 (November 2024) on Script Proposals
18.0	U+1CEDD..1CEDF	3	L2/25-123		Mayer, Uwe; et al. (2025-03-24), Proposal to encode 11 cossic characters
18.0	U+1CEDD..1CEDF	3	L2/25-091R		Kučera, Jan; et al. (2025-04-22), "5.12 Leibniz", Recommendations to UTC #183 (April 2025) on Script Proposals
18.0	U+1CEDD..1CEDF	3		N5333	Mayer, Uwe; et al. (2025-05-13), Proposal to encode 12 cossic characters
18.0	U+1CEDD..1CEDF	3		N5333R	Mayer, Uwe; et al. (2025-09-30), Proposal to encode 12 cossic characters
18.0	U+1CEDD..1CEDF	3	L2/25-232R		Kučera, Jan; Pournader, Roozbeh; Anderson, Deborah; Leroy, Robin; Goregaokar, Manish (2025-10-27), "2.7 Leibniz", Recommendations to UTC #185 (October 2025) on Script Proposals
18.0	U+1CEDD..1CEDF	3		N5333R2	Mayer, Uwe; et al. (2025-11-25), Proposal to encode 12 cossic characters
18.0	U+1CEDD..1CEDF	3	L2/26-054R2		Anderson, Debbie; Constable, Peter (2026-01-22), "2. Cossic characters", Proposed Leibniz additions for Unicode 18.0
18.0	U+1CEDD..1CEDF	3	L2/26-003		"Consensus 186-C31", UTC #186 Minutes, 2026-02-01, "UTC accepts [...] Cossic characters for encoding in Unicode 18.0 ..."
18.0	U+1CEF1..1CEF5	5	L2/25-062		Mayer, Uwe; et al. (2025-02-14), Proposal to encode 5 historic mathematical operators
18.0	U+1CEF1..1CEF5	5	L2/25-091R		Kučera, Jan; et al. (2025-04-22), "2.1 Leibniz", Recommendations to UTC #183 (April 2025) on Script Proposals
18.0	U+1CEF1..1CEF5	5	L2/25-085		Leroy, Robin (2025-04-28), "Consensus 183-C12", UTC #183 Minutes, "Provisionally assign 5 code points ..."
18.0	U+1CEF1..1CEF5	5	L2/25-226		"Consensus 185-C40", UTC #185 Minutes, 2025-10-29, "UTC accepts for encoding in Unicode 18.0 ..."
18.0	U+1CEF6..1CEFD	8	L2/25-124		Mayer, Uwe; et al. (2025-03-25), Proposal to encode 10 mathematical symbols
18.0	U+1CEF6..1CEFD	8	L2/25-091R		Kučera, Jan; et al. (2025-04-22), "5.14 Leibniz", Recommendations to UTC #183 (April 2025) on Script Proposals
18.0	U+1CEF6..1CEFD	8		N5331	Mayer, Uwe; et al. (2025-05-07), Proposal to encode mathematical symbols
18.0	U+1CEF6..1CEFD	8	L2/25-232R		Kučera, Jan; Pournader, Roozbeh; Anderson, Deborah; Leroy, Robin; Goregaokar, Manish (2025-10-27), "3.1 Leibniz", Recommendations to UTC #185 (October 2025) on Script Proposals
18.0	U+1CEF6..1CEFD	8	L2/25-226		"Consensus 185-C32", UTC #185 Minutes, 2025-10-29, "Provisionally assign 8 code points ..."
18.0	U+1CEF6..1CEFD	8	L2/26-003		"Consensus 186-C18", UTC #186 Minutes, 2026-02-01, "UTC accepts [...] eight mathematical symbols provisionally assigned ..."
