= Geomancy =

Method of divination that interprets markings on the ground

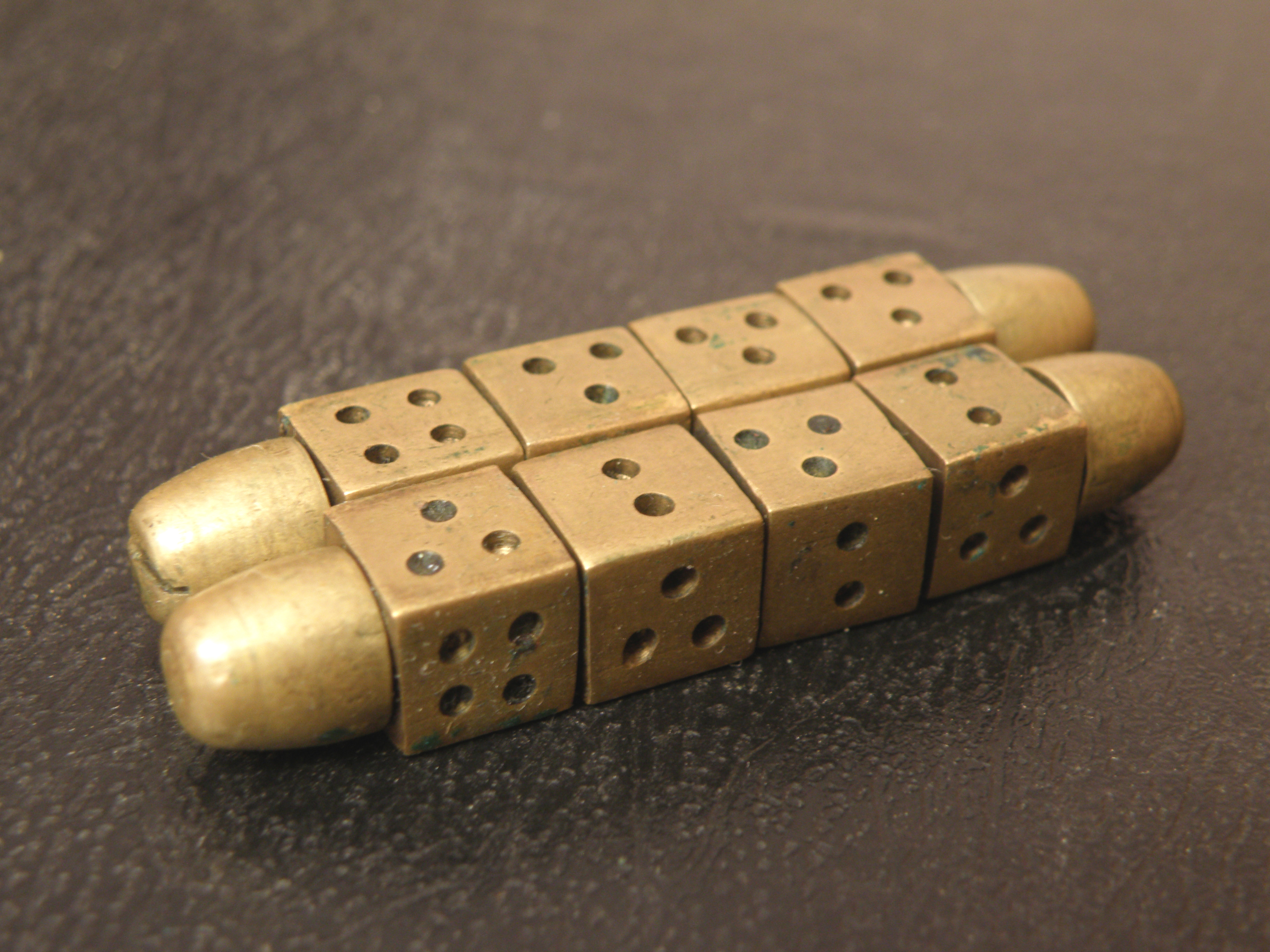
Geomancy tool

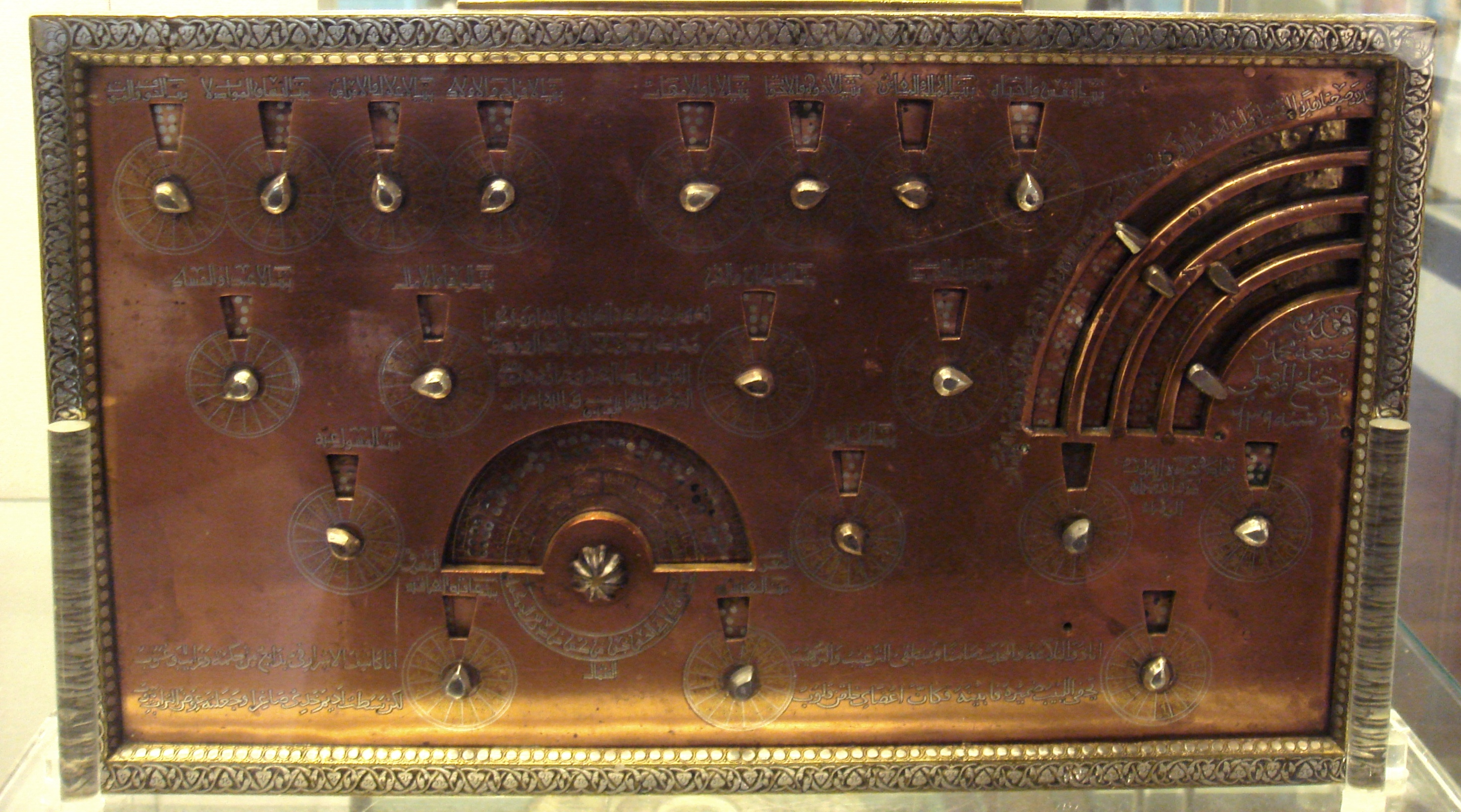
Geomantic instrument, Egypt or Syria, 1241–42 CE, by Muhammad ibn Khutlukh al Mawsuli. When the dials were turned, random designs of dots would appear, which were then interpreted. British Museum.

Geomancy, a compound of Greek roots denoting "earth divination", was originally used to mean methods of divination that interpret geographic features, markings on the ground, or the patterns formed by soil, rocks, or sand. Its definition has expanded over time (along with the recognized definition of the suffix -mancy), to include any spiritual, metaphysical, or pseudoscientific practice that is related to the Earth. In recent times the term has been applied to a wide range of other occult and fringe activities.

Geomancy was a common, and cross cultural, form of divination in premodern times. In regard to Africa and Europe, it was considered a forbidden practice by various Christians and Muslims across the medieval era. In other regions and cultures, geomancy practices include Sikidy and Ifá (found in West Africa), I Ching and Feng shui (found in China), Kumalak (found in parts of Central Asia), Vastu shastra (in India), Kahuna kuhikuhipu'uone (in Ancient Hawai'i).

== Etymology and history ==
The sixteen geomantic figures of Arabic geomancy.

The word geomancy, from Late Greek *γεωμαντεία *geōmanteía, translates literally to 'earth divination'. In Latin it becomes geomantia. Earlier Greek renditions of this word borrowed the Arabic word raml ('sand') directly, rendering it as rhamplion or rabolion. Other Arabic names for geomancy include khatt al-raml, darb al-raml, and 'ilm al-raml, (literally 'the science of the sand'). The origins of geomancy are Arabic and the original geomantic figures were created by "making lines of random numbers of dots in the sand".

Geomancy was one of the forms of divination throughout Africa and Europe, particularly during the Middle Ages. However it was classified by Christians as one of the seven "forbidden arts", along with black magic, hydromancy, aeromancy, pyromancy, chiromancy (palmistry), and scapulimancy.

== Forms ==
=== Arabic geomancy ===
The Arabic tradition consists of sketching sixteen random lines of dots in sand. This same process survived virtually unchanged through its introduction to Europe in the medieval era, and survives to this day in various Arabic countries. With the arrival of Islam, this practice was discouraged. As reported by the Sunan Abi Dawud, Qatan bin Qabisa narrates from his father that Prophet Muhammad said, “Divining through lines (raml), taking bad omens, and using birds to predict fortunes are acts of Satan.”

=== African geomancy ===
Like Arabic geomancy, Sikidy and other forms of African divination follow techniques that have remained virtually unchanged. As an example, Sikidy is the most important method of divination for the Malagasy peoples of Madagascar. The process involves a mathematical grid of disk-shaped seeds in sixteen figures arranged in rows which the sorcerer uses to divine the future.

One traditional form of geomancy in Africa consists of throwing handfuls of dirt in the air and observing how the dirt falls. It can also involve a mouse as the agent of the earth spirit. Ifá, one of the oldest forms of geomancy, originated in West Africa, and uses the same sixteen geomantic figures as in Arabic and Western geomancy with different meanings and names; the process is shortened to using only two figures.

=== Chinese geomancy ===
In China, the diviner may enter a trance and make markings on the ground that are interpreted by an associate (often a young or illiterate boy). Similar forms of geomancy include scrying involving the patterns seen in rocks or soil.

==== I Ching ====
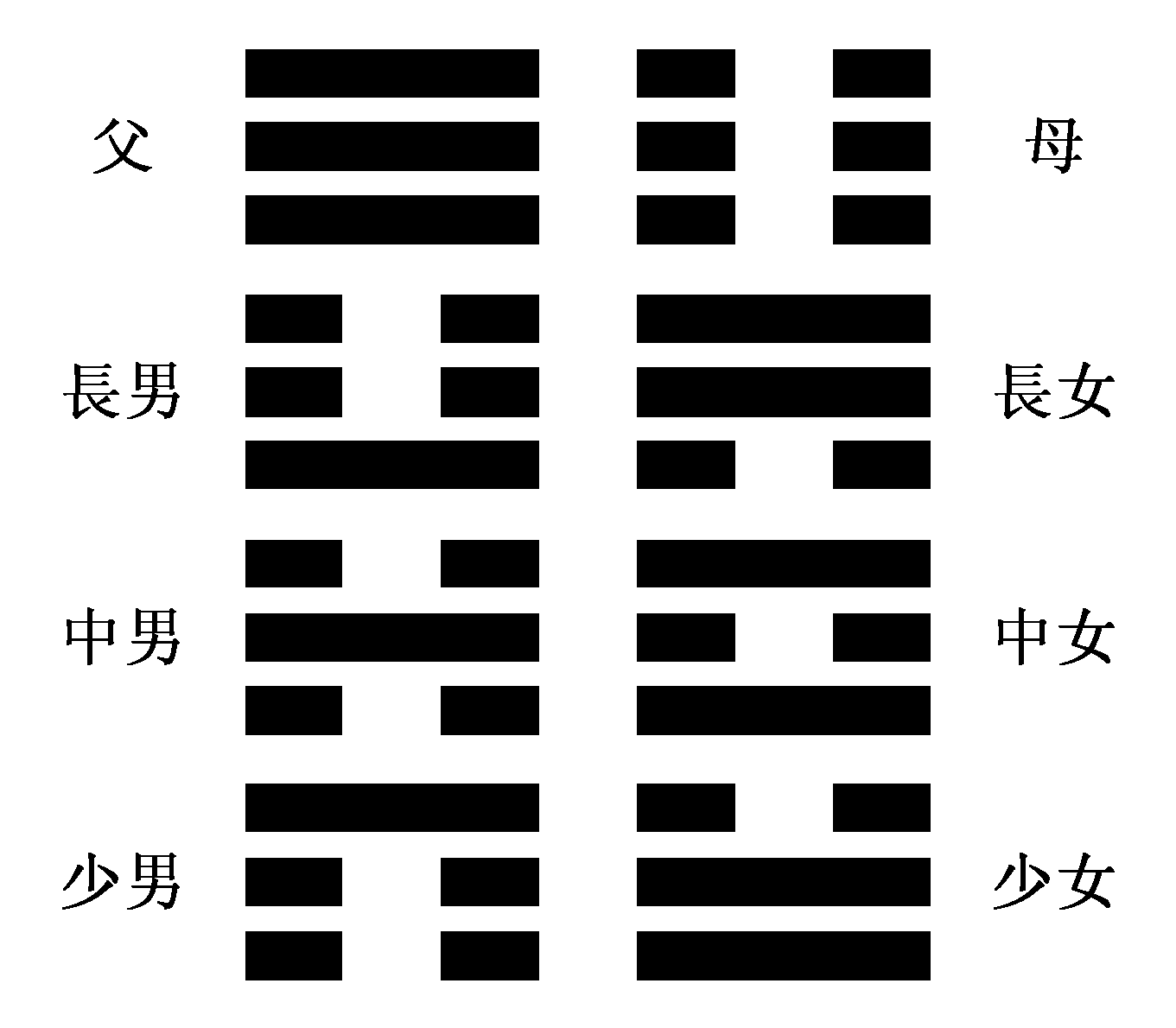
The eight trigrams used in I Ching.

The Chinese divination practice of the I Ching has several striking similarities to geomancy. It includes a series of binary trigrams (as opposed to tetragrams used in geomancy) that are generated at random, the resulting figures of which are taken in combination. However, the figures are not added or reorganized as in geomancy, but are instead taken to form a single hexagram. While there are 2^{3}, or eight, trigrams, there are 2^{6}, or 64, hexagrams. This yields a smaller set of resulting charts than geomancy.

==== Feng shui ====
In the 19th century, Christian missionaries in China translated feng shui as "geomancy" due to their observations of local shamans and priests manipulating the flow and direction of energy based on aesthetics, location, and position of objects and buildings. Although it stems from a distinct tradition, the term geomancy now commonly includes feng shui. Similarly, the introduction of a similar Indian system of aesthetics and positioning to harmonize the local energies, vastu shastra, has come under the name "geomancy".

=== Indian Vastu shastra ===
Vastu shastra is a traditional Indian system of architecture which literally translates to "science of architecture". These are texts found on the Indian subcontinent that describe principles of design, layout, measurements, ground preparation, space arrangement, and spatial geometry. Vastu Shastras incorporate traditional Hindu and in some cases Buddhist beliefs. The designs are intended to integrate architecture with nature, the relative functions of various parts of the structure, and ancient beliefs utilizing geometric patterns (yantra), symmetry, and directional alignments.

Vastu Shastra are the textual part of Vastu Vidya, the latter being the broader knowledge about architecture and design theories from ancient India. Vastu Vidya knowledge is a collection of ideas and concepts, with or without the support of layout diagrams. These ideas and concepts do not follow rigid rules but rather are models for the organization of space and form within a building or collection of buildings, based on their functions in relation to each other, their usage and to the overall fabric of the Vastu. Ancient Vastu Shastra principles include those for the design of Mandir (Hindu temples), and the principles for the design and layout of houses, towns, cities, gardens, roads, water works, shops and other public areas.

=== Central Asian Kumalak ===
Kumalak is a type of geomancy practiced in Kazakhstan, Tuva, and other parts of Central Asia. Kumalak makes use of a three by three grid, wherein a shaman will ritually place up to 41 beads. These shamans use kumalak more to connect with their ancestors and spiritual guides than to obtain information through divination. Further, shamans who use kumalak must be initiated and taught how to perform the rituals of kumalak correctly. According to them, kumalak is an ancient system of knowledge reaching back to the roots of their civilization.

=== Korean geomancy ===
P'ungsu (which like feng shui literally means 'wind water'), is the Korean word for geomancy. As a method of divination it seeks to locate favorable sites for cities, residences and burial.

This tradition was popularized in Korea in the ninth century by the Buddhist monk Toson (Doseon), who studied and adapted the ideas and practices of the different Chinese Daoist schools of Feng-shui to the Korean landscape situation and cultural traditions.

In Korea, geomancy takes the form of interpreting the topography of the land to determine future events and or the strength of a dynasty or particular family. Therefore, not only were location and land forms important, but the topography could shift causing disfavor and the need to relocate. The idea is still accepted in many South East Asian societies today, although with reduced force.

== See also ==
- Geomantic figures – Symbols used in divinatory geomancy
- Dowsing – Pseudoscientific attempts to locate underground objects
- Earth mysteries – Range of beliefs regarding earthly supernatural phenomena
- Ley line – Straight alignments between historic structures and landmarks
- Methods of divination
- Spiritual mapping – Charismatic Christian process of discovering and mapping demonically controlled regions
- Tiang Seri – System of geomancy in south-east Asia
- Vashtu – Indian architecture and design-related texts
