= Kumalak =

Method of divination

Kumalak (qumalaq; Kazakh: құмалақ) is a form of geomancy, or divination, which originates in Central Asia. This fortune telling method involves 41 beans, stones, or sheep dung ("kumalak" means sheep dung in the Turkic languages) sorted into piles, and has been used for hundreds of years in the region of present-day Kazakhstan, Kyrgyzstan, Mongolia, and Siberia by Turkic peoples such as the Kazakh, Kyrgyz, and Tatars.

Similar to other forms of divination such as tarot or runecasting, Kumalak is practiced by shamans who seek to connect to their Turkic ancestors in the spiritual realm. A spiritual teacher trains and mentors the shaman for years before the initiation ritual is completed. Such shamans are often consulted by villagers looking for advice on their future. Kumalak is believed by Kazakhs to be a spiritual tool which opens spiritual gateways to connect with their ancestors. Similar connections can be seen in other Shamanic cultures.

In order to understand the variations in Kumalak, 41 dried sheep droppings ("qırıq bir qumalaq"), beans, or stones are laid on a cloth on the earth, and then touched, one by one, to the reader's forehead. This is said to open the third eye, allowing second sight and intuitive perception. Following this, incantations are repeated until a spirit jumps to the earth realm in order to reveal answers and move the beads accordingly.

The stones are then divided into three piles. Four pebbles at a time are removed from each pile until 1–4 pebbles remain, and these are placed on a nine-square grid (resembling a tic-tac-toe board). The piles are then separated and re-sorted, resulting in 1–4 stones in each square, correlating to one of nature's four elements: 1 to fire, 2 to water, 3 to wind, and 4 to earth. The squares are also demarcated by rows and columns, as representing body parts, the past/present/future, head and heart, distance, and mental state. Trained Kumalak readers are said to be able to see the beads actually move around in a way not visible to the untrained eye.

A similar method, called falanje or bacanje graha, is practised in Bosnia and Herzegovina as well, also involving 41 beans.
