= Ambatomanga =

Ambatomanga may refer to:

- Ambatomanga, Arivonimamo, Madagascar
- Ambatomanga, Manjakandriana, Madagascar
