= Geomantic figures =

Symbols used in divinatory geomancy

The sixteen geomantic figures

The 16 geomantic figures are primary symbols utilized in geomancy, an ancient divinatory practice. Each figure consists of four lines representing the classical elements and can be interpreted through various methods and questions. Originating from African traditions, geomancy was introduced to Europe in the Middle Ages, where it acquired astrological meanings and new interpretive layers. These figures exhibit a superficial resemblance to the ba gua, the eight trigrams in the I Ching, a Chinese classic text.

Each figure carries distinct attributes and meanings. Figures are classified by qualities like stability or mobility, impartiality or partiality, and entering or exiting. These classifications provide nuances in interpretation. The figures are associated with elements, zodiac signs, planets, and body parts. They can be paired according to their qualities and properties. The figures' astrological correspondences introduced in the European tradition further enriched their meanings and connections.

== The sixteen figures ==
Each of the figures is composed of four lines, each line containing either one or two points.

=== Via ===
Latin for "the Way". The figure resembles a road or path. It is considered bad of most things, but good with concerns of roads, travels, or journeys. Astrologically it is associated with Cancer and the waning Moon and both its inner and outer elements are water. All the elements in Via are active and as such the figure indicates change more than any other figure. Regarding the outcome of the situation being divined, it is neutral, unless change by itself infers a positive or negative result. This figure inverts any figure when added, giving it another meaning of change. Its planetary ruler is Chashmodai, its Intelligence is the Intelligence of Intelligences Malkah beTarshishim ve-ad Ruachoth Shechalim, and its Spirit is the Spirit of Spirits is Shad Barshemoth ha-Shartathan. It is associated with the deities Diana and Mercurius and the angels Gabriel and Muriel. It is associated with the stomach.

=== Cauda Draconis ===
Latin for "the Tail of the Dragon" and the figure of the south node of the Moon. It is considered very bad in most situations, such that in older traditions if this was the first figure drawn the geomancy reading was stopped. It is only good in circumstances for ending or completing things, such as breaking up a relationship. It brings good with evil, and evil with good. It is associated with the malefic planets Saturn and Mars and the astrological sign Virgo. Its inner and outer element are both fire. Its planetary intelligences are Agiel and Graphiel and its spirits are Zazel and Bartzabel; it is associated with the deities Mavors, Saeturnus, and Athena, and the angels Cassiel, Samael and Malchidael. It is associated with the left arm.

=== Puer ===
Latin for "the Boy". The figure is a representation of a sword or erect phallus and refers to male energies, primarily aggression and passion, but also war and male sexuality. It is bad in most cases, but good in situations where boys (in Antiquity and Medieval society) excelled: love and war. Astrologically it is associated with Aries and Mars. All elements are active except Water, the element of emotion; its inner element is air, but due to it being ruled by Mars, its outer element is fire. Its planetary intelligence is Graphiel and its spirit is Bartzabel; it is associated with the deities Mars and Athena and the angels Samael and Malchidael. It is associated with the head.

=== Fortuna Minor ===
Latin for "the Lesser Fortune". The figure is symbolic of success coming down like beams of light from the Sun. Astrologically it is associated with Leo and the Sun in southern declinations; both its inner and outer elemental rulers are fire. It indicates a weakly positive outcome in nearly all questions, representing transient success that is dependent upon outside help. It favors situations that can be resolved quickly and do not need to be sustained. It is a figure of change and instability. Its planetary intelligence is Nakhiel and its spirit is Sorath; it is associated with the deities Apollo and Jupiter and the angels Michael and Verchiel. It is associated with the spine.

=== Puella ===
Latin for "the Girl". The figure is to resemble the vulva or a woman with exaggerated breasts. It is good in most situations, especially with women, beauty, or feminine situations. Astrologically it is associated with Libra and Venus; its outer element is air, but its inner element is water. It represents peace and passivity, which can be either positive or negative depending on the question being answered, though generally positive, requiring to be acted upon instead of it acting on a situation. It is the symbol of feminine sexuality, balancing the energy of Puer. Its planetary intelligence is Hagiel and its spirit is Kedemel; it is associated with the deities Venus and Vulcan and the angels Anael and Zuriel. It is associated with the kidneys, lower back, buttocks, and skin.

=== Amissio ===
Latin for "Loss". The figure is of two bowls or cups turned upside-down. Astrologically, it is associated with Taurus and Venus retrograde. Its inner element is fire but ruled outwardly by earth. In general, the figure is bad or negative figure for all charts except those for love (being a figure of Venus) or where loss is desired and denotes loss. Often it represents something outside of one's grasp. Its planetary intelligence is Hagiel and its spirit is Kedemel; it is associated with the goddess Venus and the angels Anael and Asmodel. It is associated with the neck and throat.

=== Carcer ===
Latin for "the Prison". The figure is the outline of an enclosure, a link in a chain, or prison cell. It is usually bad in situations and denotes delays, setbacks, or bindings. Astrologically it is associated with Capricorn and Saturn retrograde; its inner and outer element is earth. It refers to immobility, and also thereby strength. Depending on the question it could indicate a restriction or a source of willpower. It is generally unfavourable, but can be favourable in questions involving stability or security. Its planetary intelligence is Agiel and its spirit is Zazel; it is associated with the deities Saturn and Vesta, and the angels Cassiel and Hanael. It is associated with the knees and skeletal system of the body.

=== Laetitia ===
Latin for "Joy". The figure resembles an arch, fountain, or rainbow. It is good in situations that concern potential, joy, or happiness. Astrologically it is associated with Pisces and Jupiter retrograde. It is ruled externally by water, but inwardly by fire. It is a positive figure for nearly all questions, representing fast situations and construction. It indicates upward motion, happiness, or joy. Its planetary intelligence is Iophiel and its spirit is Hismael; it is associated with the deities Jove and Neptunus, and the angels Sachiel and Barchiel. It is associated with the feet.

=== Caput Draconis ===
Latin for "the Head of the Dragon". The figure resembles the astrological symbol the north node of the Moon. It is neutral figure (good with good, evil with evil) but fortunate with starting or beginning new things. It is favourable for beginnings and profit, and otherwise favourable with other favourable figures, and unfavourable with unfavourable ones. It is associated with the benefic planets Jupiter and Venus, and assigned to the zodiac sign of Sagittarius; its outer element is fire due to its association with Sagittarius while its inner element is earth. Its planetary intelligences are Iophiel and Hagiel and its spirits are Hismael and Kedemel; it is associated with the deities Venus, Iove, and Vulcan, and the angels Sachiel, Anael, and Zuriel. It is associated with the right arm.

=== Conjunctio ===
Latin for "the Conjunction". The figure resembles a crossroads or joining of two figures. The sign is neutral in meaning (good in good things, evil in evil), but good with joining or recovering things, especially marriage or relationships. Astrologically it is associated with Virgo and Mercury retrograde. It represents a combination of forces, for good or ill. By itself, it is neutral, only becoming favourable or not by other figures around it. Its outer element is earth, while its inner element is air. Its planetary intelligence is Tiriel and its spirit is Taphthartharath; it is associated with the deities Mercurius and Ceres, and the angels Raphael and Hamaliel. It is associated with the intestines and digestive system.

=== Acquisitio ===
Latin for "Gain". The figure resembles two bowls or cups turned upright. It is good in almost all situations, especially for getting and obtaining things. Astrologically it is associated with Sagittarius and Jupiter, with its outer element ruled by fire and its inner element ruled by air. For most charts it is a positive figure, except where a loss is desired. It indicates a gain financially, mentally, or in any other form, or something within one's grasp. Its planetary intelligence is Iophiel and its spirit is Hismael; it is associated with the deities Jove and Diana, and the angels Sachiel and Adnachiel. It is associated with the hips and thighs.

=== Rubeus ===
Latin for "Red". The figure is an overturned glass; an inversion, meaning good in all that is evil, and evil in all that is good. Like the Tail of the Dragon, the figure is considered so unfavourable that if it were the first in a reading, the reading would end. Astrologically it is associated with Scorpio and Mars retrograde; its inner element is ruled by air, and its outer element ruled by water. It represents passion, deception, violence, and vice. Its planetary intelligence is Graphiel and its spirit is Bartzabel; it is associated with the god Mars, and the angels Samael and Barbiel. It is associated with the reproductive and excretory systems along with the genitals.

=== Fortuna Major ===
Latin for "the Greater Fortune". The figure resembles blessings growing from the earth and being fruitful in the air. It is good in all situations in a best case scenario sense and represents great good fortune, especially in beginnings. Astrologically it is associated with Leo, like Fortuna Minor, but by the Sun in northern declinations. Its inner element is earth while its outer element is fire. It denotes power and success, and so is very favourable in conflicts and contests; being a figure of stability and long-term success, it also denotes hardship at the outset of an endeavor. Its planetary intelligence is Nakhiel and its spirit is Sorath; it is associated with the deities Apollo and Jupiter, and the angels Michael and Verchiel. It is associated with the heart and chest.

=== Albus ===
Latin for "White". The figure resembles an upright glass or goblet. It is good in most situations, especially with good figures in company, but itself is a weak figure. Astrologically it is associated with Gemini and Mercury; even though its inner element is water, its outer element is air. It represents peace, wisdom and purity. It benefits beginnings and profit, or any situation where careful and deliberate planning is needed. Its planetary intelligence is Tiriel and its spirit is Taphthartharath; it is associated with the deities Mercury and Apollo, and the angels Raphael and Ambriel. It is associated with the shoulders and lungs.

=== Tristitia ===
Latin for "Sorrow". The figure resembles a broken arch or a stake being driven into the ground. It is bad in most cases and connotes sadness or mourning. Astrologically it is associated with Aquarius and Saturn. Tristitia is an unfavorable figure in almost all questions, usually representing pain and suffering. However, it is favorable in questions dealing with stability, building, or the Earth (such as agriculture). Its outer element is air and inner element is earth. Its planetary intelligence is Agiel and its spirit is Zazel; it is associated with the deities Saturn and Juno, and the angels Cassiel and Gabriel. It is associated with the ankles and lower legs.

=== Populus ===
Latin for "the People". The figure resembles a bird's eye view of a group of people. The figure can mean that the outcome is based on the people of the situation, or represents a large number of people or peers. Astrologically it is associated with Cancer and the waxing Moon; both its inner and outer elements are water. It refers to a gathering or assembly of people and is very neutral, for though there may be a great deal of movement within the crowd, there is very little effect on the crowd as a whole. It is favorable with favorable figures, and unfavorable with unfavorable ones. Its planetary ruler is Chashmodai, its Intelligence is the Intelligence of Intelligences Malkah beTarshishim ve-ad Ruachoth Shechalim, and its Spirit is the Spirit of Spirits is Shad Barshemoth ha-Shartathan. It is associated with the deities Diana and Mercury, and the angels Gabriel and Muriel. It is associated with the breasts and torso.

== Unicode ==
Geomantic figures were added to the Unicode Standard in September 2025 with the release of version 17.0, to the Miscellaneous Symbols Supplement block:

- U+1CEE0 𜻠 GEOMANTIC FIGURE POPULUS
- U+1CEE1 𜻡 GEOMANTIC FIGURE TRISTITIA
- U+1CEE2 𜻢 GEOMANTIC FIGURE ALBUS
- U+1CEE3 𜻣 GEOMANTIC FIGURE FORTUNA MAJOR
- U+1CEE4 𜻤 GEOMANTIC FIGURE RUBEUS
- U+1CEE5 𜻥 GEOMANTIC FIGURE ACQUISITIO
- U+1CEE6 𜻦 GEOMANTIC FIGURE CONJUNCTIO
- U+1CEE7 𜻧 GEOMANTIC FIGURE CAPUT DRACONIS
- U+1CEE8 𜻨 GEOMANTIC FIGURE LAETITIA
- U+1CEE9 𜻩 GEOMANTIC FIGURE CARCER
- U+1CEEA 𜻪 GEOMANTIC FIGURE AMISSIO
- U+1CEEB 𜻫 GEOMANTIC FIGURE PUELLA
- U+1CEEC 𜻬 GEOMANTIC FIGURE FORTUNA MINOR
- U+1CEED 𜻭 GEOMANTIC FIGURE PUER
- U+1CEEE 𜻮 GEOMANTIC FIGURE CAUDA DRACONIS
- U+1CEEF 𜻯 GEOMANTIC FIGURE VIA

== Properties ==
Each figure has four lines or rows, with each row representing one of the elements; each row can be either active or passive. Above, Puer is shown to have the Fire, Air, and Earth lines active, but the Water line remains passive.

Each of the figures is composed of four lines, each line containing either one or two points. Each line represents one of the four classical elements: from top to bottom, the lines represent fire, air, water, and earth. When a line has a single point, the element is said to be active; otherwise, with two points, the element is passive. Because there are four lines, and since each line can be either active or passive, there are 2^{4}, or 16, different figures. The different combinations of elements yields different representations or manifestations of the figure's energy.

Each figure can be said to have a ruling element, whereby that element's energy and manifestations correlates most closely to the figure itself. With the exception of Populus, the ruling element for each figure is always represented as active (a single point in the corresponding line). For figures with only one active element, that element by default is its ruling element; other combinations of active and passive elements require more introspection to assign rulerships. Populus, consisting of all passive lines, is ruled by Water by its nature of being entirely passive and taking on the reflective qualities of water whenever an outside force acts upon it.

Ruling Element	Figures Ruled
Fire	Laetitia, Cauda Draconis, Fortuna Minor, Amissio
Air	Puer, Rubeus, Acquisitio, Conjunctio
Water	Populus, Via, Albus, Puella
Earth	Fortuna Major, Tristitia, Caput Draconis, Carcer

While the elements just described are from the geomantic tradition, another set of elemental assignments are used based on the figures' astrological connections. These elements are assigned based on the zodiac sign of a given figure. The geomantic element is said to reflect the nature of a figure when viewed alone; the astrological element reflects its nature when acting with other figures.

Ruling Element	Figures Ruled
Fire	Puer, Fortuna Major, Fortuna Minor, Acquisitio, Cauda Draconis
Air	Albus, Puella, Tristitia
Water	Populus, Via, Rubeus, Laetitia
Earth	Amissio, Conjunctio, Caput Draconis, Carcer

Another classification of the geomantic figures involves their quality, which is either stable or mobile. The quality of a figure represents its duration of effect or motion, such that a figure with a stable quality will represent a long-term situation or that a certain object remains where it was left, while a mobile figure represents a transient effect upon the real world. In simple "yes or no" style divinations, stable figures indicate a positive answer, while mobile figures indicate a negative one.

Quality	Figures
Stable	Acquisitio, Albus, Puella, Populus, Tristitia, Caput Draconis, Carcer, Fortuna Major
Mobile	Laetitia, Cauda Draconis, Amissio, Fortuna Minor, Rubeus, Puer, Conjunctio, Via

Originally, the quality was shown in terms of entering or exiting figures, where, from the viewer's point of view, the figure would be pointing towards (downward) or away from (upward) the viewer. Entering figures have the stable quality, while the exiting figures have the mobile quality; when an entering figure is rotated upside-down, it becomes an exiting figure, and vice versa. However, based on this classification, the four figures that point in both directions regardless of rotation have the quality of both entering and exiting and must be evaluated in terms of its neighbors or generating figures.

Direction	Figures
Entering	Acquisitio, Albus, Puella, Tristitia, Caput Draconis, Fortuna Major
Exiting	Laetitia, Cauda Draconis, Amissio, Fortuna Minor, Rubeus, Puer
Both	Populus, Via, Carcer, Conjunctio

In the generation of the geomantic charts, the primary answer is given by the figure called the Judge. Based upon the mathematics involved in generating the charts, the Judge figure must always have an even number of points. For this reason, all the figures that can appear as Judges (i.e. have an even number of points) are also termed impartial figures; they represent objective states of the world observable equally by any party. The ones with odd numbers of points are termed partial or personal due to their subjective and emotional nature.

Type	Figures
Impartial	Populus, Via, Carcer, Conjunctio, Amissio, Acquisitio, Fortuna Major, Fortuna Minor
Partial	Laetitia, Tristitia, Rubeus, Albus, Cauda Draconis, Caput Draconis, Puella, Puer

In the Middle Ages, when geomancy was introduced to Europe where astrology was the foremost occult practice, the geomantic figures obtained astrological correspondences to the Zodiac and to the planets. Based on their zodiacal correspondences, astrologers assigned new elemental rulerships (henceforth known as outer elemental rulers, whereas the previous elemental assignments will be known as inner elemental rulers) based on the element of their zodiacal ruler. The exceptions to the planetary rulerships were the figures Cauda Draconis and Caput Draconis, which were assigned to the northern and southern lunar nodes instead.

Planet	Diurnal figure	Nocturnal figure
Sun	Fortuna Major	Fortuna Minor
Moon	Populus	Via
Mercury	Albus	Conjunctio
Venus	Puella	Amissio
Mars	Puer	Rubeus
Jupiter	Acquisitio	Laetitia
Saturn	Tristitia	Carcer
Lunar nodes	Caput Draconis	Cauda Draconis

Traditionally, the energies and manifestations of the planets were different based on their declination or motion; for the planets Mercury, Venus, Mars, Jupiter, and Saturn, the diurnal energy represents the planet in direct motion, while the nocturnal energy refers to the retrograde motion of the planets. For the Moon, this was illustrated by the waxing or waning periods of the Moon, respectively; the Sun's figures were based on the Sun during the day (or northern declination) or during the night (southern declination). The zodiacal rulerships followed from the diurnal or nocturnal planetary rulership: nocturnal figures are assigned earth and water signs, while diurnal figures are assigned fire and air signs. The North Node is assigned, by Gerard of Cremona, to Sagittarius and the South Node to Virgo (for the sake of finding the ascendant in astrological traditions of geomancy). Once the zodiacal rulerships were agreed upon, all the following correspondences followed upon the geomantic figures, including what part of the body they each ruled over, different countries, planetary hours, body and character types, and so on.

== Operations ==
=== Addition ===
The structure of the figures themselves can be directly translated into binary numbers, such as those used by modern computers, with passive lines representing the numeral 0 (or logic low) and active lines representing the numeral 1 (or logic high). This structure is exploited in computation of more figures by means of the XOR function used widely in computer science and electrical systems; when two figures are "added" to form a new figure (where points in the lines of the same elements are summed, divided by two, and the remainder taken), the logical operation obtains the new figure by determining which lines are different. The lines that have different numbers of points results in a line with one point (logic high), and lines with the same number of points results in a line with two points (logic low). The result of adding two figures is usually interpreted to mean the interaction between the two parties (the parent figures) or the present situation (when one parent represents the past and the other parent represents the future).

=== Inversion ===
In the same fashion how Boolean values or binary numbers can be inverted, geomantic figures can likewise be inverted. By inversion, figures whose lines are active become passive and vice versa. In this manner, Puer becomes Albus, Populus becomes Via, and so forth. Inversion represents a polarity of action, e.g. the rashness of Puer balanced by the calmness of Albus.

=== Reversion ===
Reversion, or rotation, of figures is the process that replaces the fire line of a figure with the earth line, the air line with the water line, and vice versa. By reversion, Puer and Puella are reverted pairs, as are Rubeus and Albus. Not all figures have a unique reversion: the figures that are neither entering nor exiting revert into themselves and the other figures with even points revert into their inverted figure. Reversion often represents an axial polarity, such as the male and female axis between Puer and Puella.

== See also ==
- Astrology and the classical elements – Elements in zodiac signs
- Horary astrology – Form of astrology for answering questions posed
- Ifá – Yoruba divination practice
- List of magical terms and traditions
