= Essential dignity =

Astrological concept

Essential dignity, in the context of an astrological horoscope or natal chart, refers to the relative “strength” or “weakness” of a planet based on its zodiac sign and specific degree. This strength or weakness is referred to as the planet’s essence—what the 17th-century astrologer William Lilly called "the strength, fortitude or debility of the Planets [or] significators."

== Background ==
Since most astrology centers around the unique energies of each planet, and their various effects on Earth, essential dignity is simply an extra tool for gauging any potential “pros” or ”cons” of a planet in a given horoscope chart. A specific planet may be more ”effective” in a horoscope based on the time of day or night the chart was cast, or an individual’s personal birth time, or simply what sign the planet is in. For example, the Sun is traditionally the ruler of Leo. The opposite sign of Leo is Aquarius. Thus, someone with the Sun in Aquarius will be said to have a “weakened” or “debilitated” Sun, or that their Sun is in detriment. The Sun’s effects for this person will not be as pronounced or felt as intensely. This is, of course, dependent on other factors unique to the individual, but the Sun and Leo represent the self, vitality, showmanship, loyalty and respect. Aquarius and its planetary ruler, Saturn, both represent necessary tasks, group success, detailed facts, and potentially difficult (but often needed) scenarios. In the Northern Hemisphere, Leo and the Sun are indicative of high summer. Aquarius, in January, is a zodiac sign of midwinter. The Sun in winter is lower in the sky, and thus weaker than in summer. However, not every planet in a horoscope will have an elevated or debilitated status; some planetary placements are purely “neutral”, so the perceived effects will be less noticeable or intense.

By comparison, accidental dignity indicates how much strength a planet or point derives from its position in a natal chart, such as its relation to the other factors in the chart: for example, its proximity to other planets, or to the four angles of the chart, or to stars, as well as the aspects (or symmetrical angular connections) it forms with other planets or points in the chart.

For example, to find the essential dignity of Mars at 27° of Capricorn, one would first take into account the fact that the planet is already in a dignified position—Mars is said to be exalted in the sign of Capricorn—and also that it is the "bounds" ruler of the 27th degree of Capricorn and also the face ruler of the 27th degree of Capricorn. This is a considerably dignified Mars.

If the same horoscope featured an Aquarius first house—making Capricorn the twelfth house—Mars at 27° Capricorn would be placed in the twelfth house; Mars's accidental dignity would be poor, since it would be located in a weak or malevolent cadent house. The twelfth house symbolizes rest, respite, dreams, and fantasy, as well as deep sleep and escapism. These themes are contrary to the motivated, spirited, and determined energies of Mars as a planet, and of Capricorn as a sign. If Mars, in this horoscope, were to also be squared to a malevolent planet, such as Saturn, and would be receiving a dexter square aspect from malefic Saturn, ruler of Capricorn, this would further hinder Mars's strength and ability to operate benevolently. These accidental dignity factors would tend to weaken a Mars which is otherwise strong in essential dignity.

== Traditional dignities ==
Traditionally the five essential dignities are:

- Sign vs detriment
- Exaltation vs fall
- Triplicity
- Terms (or "bounds")
- Face (or "decan")

For post-Classical astrologers, such as Bonatti or Lilly, the dignities had a hierarchy. The most important dignity was sign rulership; slightly less important was exaltation. Triplicity rulerships were still fairly important in medieval astrology, but nowhere near as vital as they were for Hellenistic astrologers such as Ptolemy. Terms or bounds rulerships became very much diminished in importance, and face rulers were almost entirely ignored. (Lilly said that the only function face rulers served was to keep a planet from being entirely peregrine—that is, without any essential dignity whatever—which was considered a malefic condition.)

However, Hellenistic astrologers had a very different view of the dignities. To earlier astrologers, such as Ptolemy and Vettius Valens, sign rulership, exaltation, triplicity rulership and bounds rulership were all of equal strength in influence.

Many modern astrologers take little heed of essential dignities, with the exception of sign rulerships (see article on ruling planets.) This is in part the result of the simplification of astrological technique that occurred when astrology lost popularity beginning in the eighteenth century (see History of astrology.) A growth oriented approach to astrology replaced determinism to represent any planetary placement as equal in potential of positive or negative expression.

== Commonly used dignities ==
The most commonly used of the traditional essential dignities are listed in the table below. (Note: This (Lilly 1999) is perhaps the source referred to most commonly, but the same table will be found in Ptolemy's Tetrabiblos, Valens' Anthologiae, Guido Bonatti's Liber Astronomiae, and a great many other major textbooks and sources.)

Sign	Ruled by	Detriment	Exaltation	Fall
Aries	Mars	Venus	Sun	Saturn
Taurus	Venus	Mars	Moon	None
Gemini	Mercury	Jupiter	None	None
Cancer	Moon	Saturn	Jupiter	Mars
Leo	Sun	Saturn	None	None
Virgo	Mercury	Jupiter	Mercury	Venus
Libra	Venus	Mars	Saturn	Sun
Scorpio	Mars	Venus	None	Moon
Sagittarius	Jupiter	Mercury	None	None
Capricorn	Saturn	Moon	Mars	Jupiter
Aquarius	Saturn	Sun	None	None
Pisces	Jupiter	Mercury	Venus	Mercury

== Modern dignities ==
Many modern astrologers use, in addition to the traditional seven visible planets, a dwarf planet located in the asteroid belt, Ceres, along with the two outer planets Uranus and Neptune, as well as the two trans-Neptunian dwarf planets Pluto and Eris, as the modern rulers of Virgo, Aquarius, Pisces, Scorpio and Libra, respectively. The practice derives from the similarity between the nature of the planets with the nature of these signs. This as illustrated by the differences in the two "decans" tables above.

Sign	Affinent Ruler	Detriment	Exaltation	Fall
Aries	Mars	Eris	Sun	Saturn
Taurus	Venus	Pluto	Moon	Uranus
Gemini	Mercury	Jupiter	Ceres	Eris
Cancer	Moon	Saturn	Jupiter	Mars
Leo	Sun	Uranus	Neptune	Pluto
Virgo	Ceres	Neptune	Mercury	Venus
Libra	Eris	Mars	Saturn	Sun
Scorpio	Pluto	Venus	Uranus	Moon
Sagittarius	Jupiter	Mercury	Eris	Ceres
Capricorn	Saturn	Moon	Mars	Jupiter
Aquarius	Uranus	Sun	Pluto	Neptune
Pisces	Neptune	Ceres	Venus	Mercury

== Terms ==
In astrology, the terms (or bounds) are a subdivision of the zodiac into five unequal regions that are assigned to each of the five traditional planets. No subdivisions are assigned to the luminaries. The terms may be traced back to as early as the middle of the first century on papyrus horoscopes. While the logic behind the creation of the terms and interpretations of the earliest horoscopes they are featured on are unknown, they are now an important element of traditional astrology, being used as a form of essential dignity and being implemented in different concepts and techniques such as reception, primary directions, and length of life techniques.

=== Types of terms ===
==== Egyptian ====
The Egyptian terms are one of the most commonly used models to organize the subdivisions of the zodiac, especially during the Hellenistic period. Astrologers such as Valens, Firmicus, and Paulus used this model. Despite being named “Egyptian,” these systems of terms appear to have originated in ancient Babylonia.

==== Ptolemaic ====
The Ptolemaic terms are another model to organize the subdivisions of the zodiac that was favored by scholar Claudius Ptolemy. Ptolemy acknowledged that the Egyptian terms were the most commonly accepted but claimed they did not “preserve the consistency either of the order or of the individual quantity.” He then suggests the Chaldean as an alternate model for organizing the terms. Ptolemy did not create this model; rather, he came across it in an ancient manuscript and adopted it for his own use, claiming “we have come upon an ancient manuscript, much damaged, which contains a natural and consistent explanation of their order and number, and at the same time the degrees reported in the aforesaid nativities and the numbers given in the summations were found to agree with the tabulation of the ancients.” This model seems to have gained more popularization during the middle ages and astrologers such as Lilly used this model.

=== Uses in practice ===
==== Essential dignity ====
The terms are used to determine the essential dignity of a planet, which refers to a planet's ability to express their significations. Some astrologers believe that different forms of essential dignity hold different “weight.” A planet in its own domicile is said to have +5, exaltation +4, triplicity +3, terms +2, and decans +1. Some Arabic texts that may reflect the traditions put more importance on domicile and exaltation as forms of essential dignity over the terms but put less emphasis on the terms, which might explain the origins of how each form came to be weighted. It does not appear that astrological literature from antiquity, however, has a ranking system of the different types of essential dignities; in fact, some astrologers believed that a planet in its own bound is just as powerful as being in its own domicile- Firmicus, for example, states “for when a planet is found in its own terms, it is just as if located in its own sign.”

==== Delineation ====
Delineations in the astrological context refer to the interpretation of charts. There are many things to evaluate when making a delineation, the terms being one of them. Interpreting the terms are made on a chart-by-chart basis and are contingent on many factors such as the sign and house it occupies, sect, aspects, etc. There are other factors to be examined as mentioned by astrologers throughout the tradition, including whether the bound lord is a benefic or malefic. Rhetorius gives some general guidelines for interpreting this claiming: “whenever one of the stars is found in the domicile of a benefic and in the terms of a benefic having significance for the nativity, it benefits the [native’s] fortune; and if it is found in the domicile of a benefic but in the terms of a malefic, it reduces the good of the fortune; but if it chances to be in the domicile of a malefic and in the terms of a malefic, it hurts and darkens his luck.” In addition to evaluating whether or not the bound lord is benefic or malefic, some astrologers have also provided their own delineations for each subdivision of the zodiac in the 12 signs. For example, Valens claims “The first 6° of Aries, those of Zeus, are temperate, robust, abundant in seed, benefic."

== Citations ==
=== Works cited ===
- Lilly, William (1999a) [1647]. Houlding, D. (ed.). Christian Astrology, Book 1: An Introduction to Astrology; Book 2: The Resolution of All Manner of Questions. London: Ascella Publications.
- Lilly, William (1999b) [1647]. Houlding, D. (ed.). Christian Astrology, Book 3: An Easie And Plaine Method Teaching How to Judge upon Nativities. London: Ascella Publications.
