= Aquarius (astrology) =

Eleventh astrological sign of the zodiac

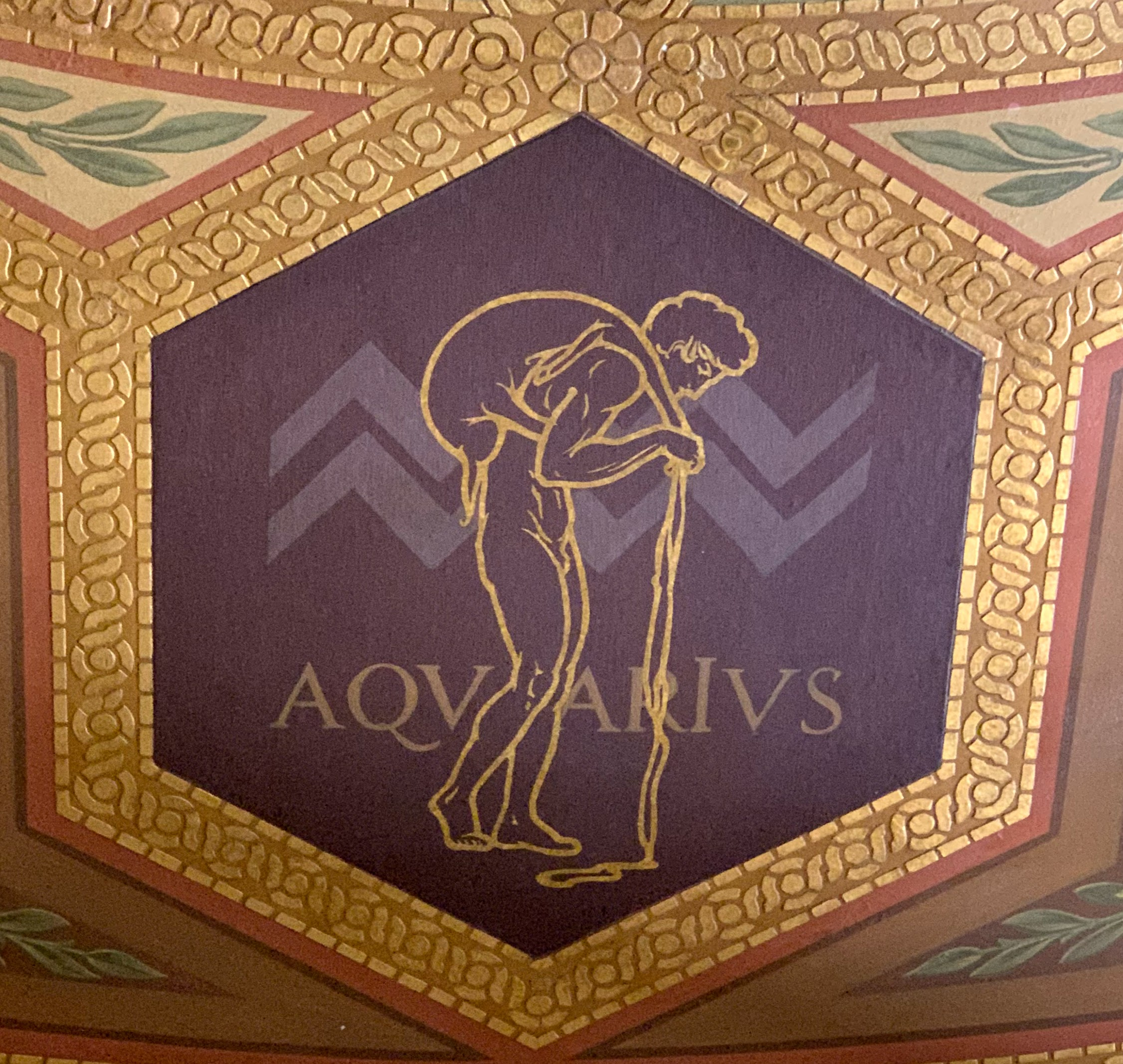
- Zodiac symbol: Water-Bearer
- Duration (tropical, western): January 20 – February 18 (2026, UT1)
- Constellation: Aquarius
- Zodiac element: Air
- Zodiac quality: Fixed
- Sign ruler: Saturn (traditional), Uranus (modern), Rahu (ascending lunar node, Vedic astrology)
- Detriment: Sun
- Exaltation: None (traditionally), Pluto (modern)
- Fall: Neptune

Aquarius (♒︎; Greek: Ὑδροχόος, romanized: Hydrokhóos, Latin for "water-bearer") is the eleventh astrological sign in the zodiac, originating from the constellation Aquarius. Under the tropical zodiac, the Sun is in the Aquarius sign between about January 20 and February 19. Aquarius is one of the three air signs, alongside Gemini and Libra. The ruling planets of Aquarius are Saturn (in traditional astrology alongside Capricorn), and Uranus (in modern astrology). It is the fixed air sign. The opposite sign of Aquarius is Leo.

== Myth ==
The water carrier represented by the constellation Aquarius was originally Enki (or Ea) to the ancient Sumerians and Babylonia. In Greek mythology, this figure was interpreted as Ganymede, a beautiful Phrygian youth. Ganymede was the son of Tros, king of Troy (according to Lucian, he was also the son of Dardanus). While tending to his father's flocks on Mount Ida, Ganymede was spotted by Zeus. The king of gods flew down to the mountain in the form of a large bird, whisking Ganymede away to the heavens. Ever since, the boy has served as cupbearer to the gods. Ovid has Orpheus sing the tale in his Metamorphoses.

== Hindu astrology ==
In Hindu (Vedic) astrology, Aquarius is known as Kumbha Rāśi (कुम्भ राशि), representing the symbol of a water pot. Kumbha is ruled by the planet Shani (Saturn) and is considered a fixed air sign. It is associated with qualities of innovation, humanitarianism, and persistence, similar to Western interpretations, but its predictive role is rooted in the sidereal zodiac system. The Kumbha Rāśi plays a key role in individual horoscopes (Janma Kundali), compatibility (Kundali Milan), and in timing rituals (Muhurta).

== Gallery ==
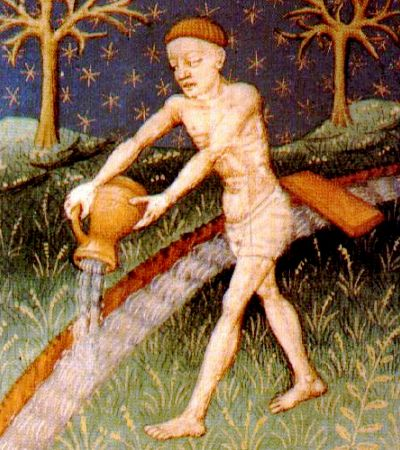

== See also ==
- Astronomical symbols
- Chinese zodiac
- Circle of stars
- Cusp (astrology)
- Elements of the zodiac
