= Glossary of astrology =

The following is a list of terms associated with astrology, a range of divinatory practices based on the apparent positions of celestial objects.

Air signs
Aquarius, Gemini, and Libra signs
Aquarius
Zodiac sign for people born January 20 through February 18
Aries
Zodiac sign for people born March 21 through April 19
Balsamic Moon

Occurs about three and a half days before the New Moon. Formerly known as the old crescent. The source for its current name is unknown but is widely applied by astrology practitioners.
Bestial signs
Zodiac signs that represent animals. The term is not in contemporary use, as the dichotomy of bestial and non-bestial signs has no bearing on interpretation nor does the "beastliness" connotation of the animal sign.
Big Three
An individual's “Sun sign, Moon sign, and Ascendant (Rising sign)”. These three components are considered fundamental in shaping a person’s personality, emotional tendencies, and outward behavior. While the Sun sign is widely recognized in popular astrology, the Moon sign and Ascendant play equally significant roles in an individual’s astrological profile.
