= Astrology and the classical elements =

Elements in zodiac signs

Astrology has used the concept of classical elements from antiquity up until the present. In Western astrology and Sidereal astrology four elements are used: Fire, Earth, Air, and Water.

== Western astrology ==
Four Classical Elements; this classic diagram has two squares on top of each other, with the corners of one being the classical elements, and the corners of the other being the properties.

In Western tropical astrology, there are 12 astrological signs. Each of the four elements is associated with three signs of the Zodiac, which are always located exactly 120 degrees away from each other along the ecliptic and said to be in trine with one another. Most modern astrologers use the four classical elements extensively, (also known as triplicities), and indeed it is still viewed as a critical part of interpreting the astrological chart.

Beginning with the first sign Aries which is a Fire sign, the next in line Taurus is Earth, then to Gemini which is Air, and finally to Cancer which is Water. This cycle continues on twice more and ends with the twelfth and final astrological sign, Pisces. The elemental rulerships for the twelve astrological signs of the zodiac (according to Marcus Manilius) are summarised as follows:

- Fire — 1 – Aries; 5 – Leo; 9 – Sagittarius – hot, dry, ardent
- Earth — 2 – Taurus; 6 – Virgo; 10 – Capricorn – heavy, cold, dry
- Air — 3 – Gemini; 7 – Libra; 11 – Aquarius – light, hot, wet
- Water — 4 – Cancer; 8 – Scorpio; 12 – Pisces – cold, wet, soft

== Elements of the zodiac ==
=== Triplicity rulerships ===
In traditional astrology, each triplicity has several planetary rulers, which change with conditions of sect – that is, whether the chart is a day chart or a night chart. Triplicity rulerships are an important essential dignity – one of the several factors used by traditional astrologers to weigh strength, effectiveness, and integrity of each planet in a chart.

Triplicity rulerships (using the "Dorothean system") are as follows:

Triplicity Rulerships
Triplicity	Day Ruler	Night Ruler	Participating Ruler
Fire (Aries, Leo, Sagittarius)	Sun	Mars	Jupiter
Earth (Taurus, Virgo, Capricorn)	Venus	Saturn	Mercury
Air (Gemini, Libra, Aquarius)	Venus	Saturn	Mercury
Water (Cancer, Scorpio, Pisces)	Moon	Mars	Jupiter

"Participating" rulers were not used by Ptolemy, as well as some subsequent astrologers in later traditions who followed his approach.

=== Triplicities by season ===
In ancient astrology, triplicities were more of a seasonal nature, so a season was given the qualities of an element, which means the signs associated with that season would be allocated to that element. The seasonal elements of ancient astrology are as follows:

- Spring (wet becoming hot) – Air – Gemini, Libra, Aquarius
- Summer (hot becoming dry) – Fire – Aries, Leo, Sagittarius
- Autumn (dry becoming cold) – Earth – Taurus, Virgo, Capricorn
- Winter (cold becoming wet) – Water – Cancer, Scorpio, Pisces

The seasonal qualities account for the differences in expression between signs of the same element. All the fire signs are by their nature hot and dry. However, the addition of the elemental qualities of the seasons results in differences between the fire signs. Aries being a Spring sign is wet (hot & dry, hot & wet), Leo being the midsummer sign gets a double dose of hot and dry and is the pure fire sign, and Sagittarius being an Autumnal sign is colder (hot & dry, cold & dry).

In the Southern Hemisphere the seasonal cycle is reversed.

This yields secondary and tertiary elements for each sign.

Sign	Element	Qualities	Season: North	Season: South
Aries	Fire	Hot & Dry	Hot & Wet (Spring/Air)	Cold & Dry (Autumn/Earth)
Taurus	Earth	Cold & Dry	Hot & Wet (Spring/Air)	Cold & Dry (Autumn/Earth)
Gemini	Air	Hot & Wet	Hot & Wet (Spring/Air)	Cold & Dry (Autumn/Earth)
Cancer	Water	Cold & Wet	Hot & Dry (Summer/Fire)	Cold & Wet (Winter/Water)
Leo	Fire	Hot & Dry	Hot & Dry (Summer/Fire)	Cold & Wet (Winter/Water)
Virgo	Earth	Cold & Dry	Hot & Dry (Summer/Fire)	Cold & Wet (Winter/Water)
Libra	Air	Hot & Wet	Cold & Dry (Autumn/Earth)	Hot & Wet (Spring/Air)
Scorpio	Water	Cold & Wet	Cold & Dry (Autumn/Earth)	Hot & Wet (Spring/Air)
Sagittarius	Fire	Hot & Dry	Cold & Dry (Autumn/Earth)	Hot & Wet (Spring/Air)
Capricorn	Earth	Cold & Dry	Cold & Wet (Winter/Water)	Hot & Dry (Summer/Fire)
Aquarius	Air	Hot & Wet	Cold & Wet (Winter/Water)	Hot & Dry (Summer/Fire)
Pisces	Water	Cold & Wet	Cold & Wet (Winter/Water)	Hot & Dry (Summer/Fire)

These associations are not given any great importance in modern astrology, although they are prominent in modern Western ceremonial magic, reconstructionist neopagan systems such as neodruidism and Wicca.

== Vedic astrology ==
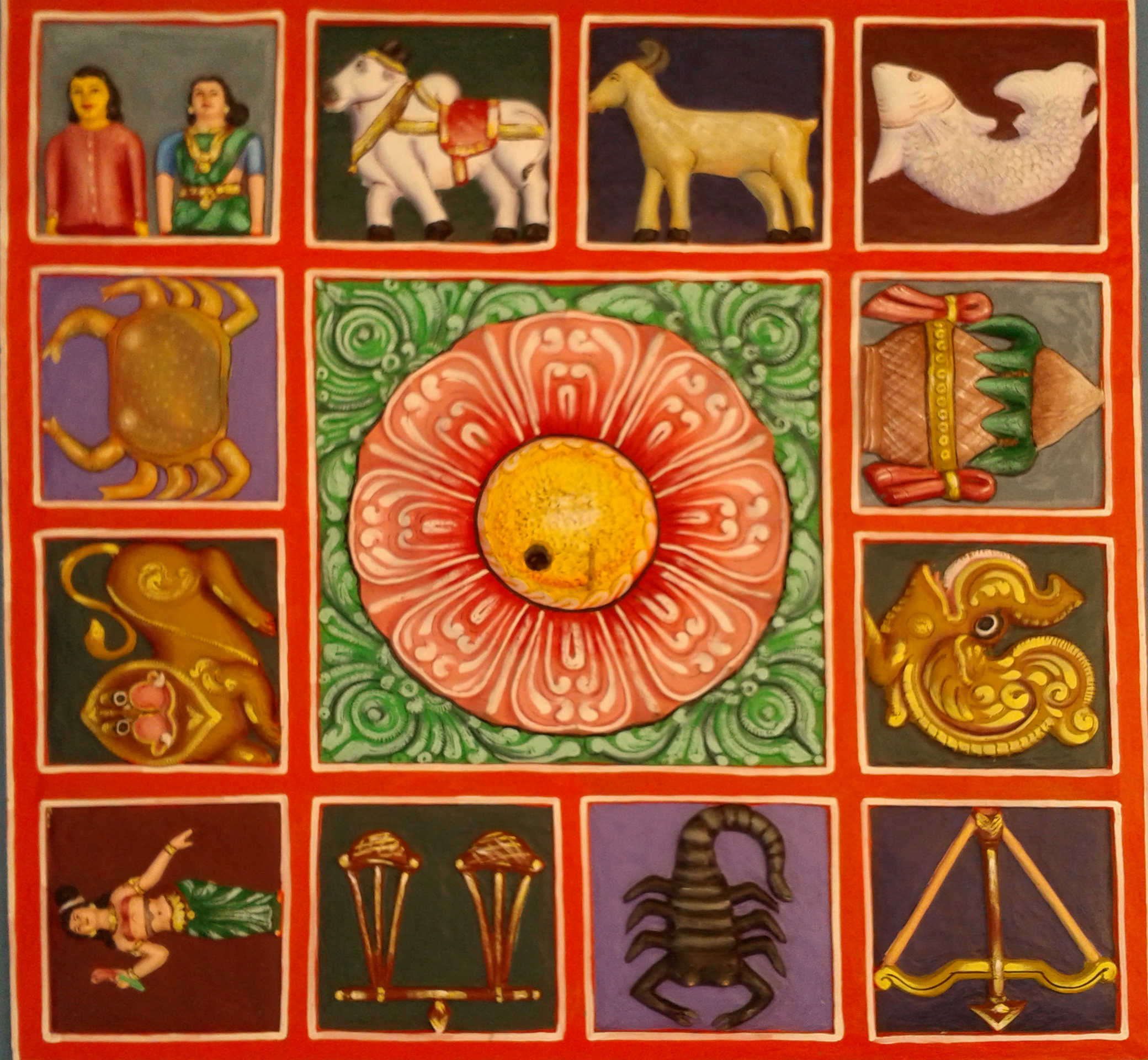
Zodiac symbols (Vedic astrology) on the terrace of a temple in Kanipakam, Andhra Pradesh

Sidereal (Vedic) astrology shares the same system as Western astrology of linking zodiac signs to elements.

In addition, in Vedic thought each of the five planets are linked to an element (with space as the first). It was said in the Veda that everything emanated from the one basic vibration of "Om" or "Aum". From "Om" the five elemental vibrations emerged representing the five different tattwas (or elements). The five planets represent these five vibrations – Jupiter for Space, Saturn for Air, Sun for Fire, Mars for Earth, and Moon for Water.

== Chinese astrology ==
In many traditional Chinese theory fields, matter and its developmental movement stage can be classified into wuxing. They are:

- Wood, associated with Jupiter, green, the east and spring;
- Fire, associated with Mars, red, the south and summer;
- Earth, associated with Saturn, yellow, center and last summer;
- Metal, associated with Venus, white, the west and autumn;
- Water, associated with Mercury, black, the north and winter.

Despite that, the essence of wuxing is really about the notion of five stages, rather than five types of material.

== Explanatory notes ==
^{a} Ptolemy later modified the rulerships of Water triplicity, making Mars the ruler of the water triplicity for both day and night charts – and William Lilly concurred.
