= Libra (astrology) =

Seventh astrological sign of the zodiac

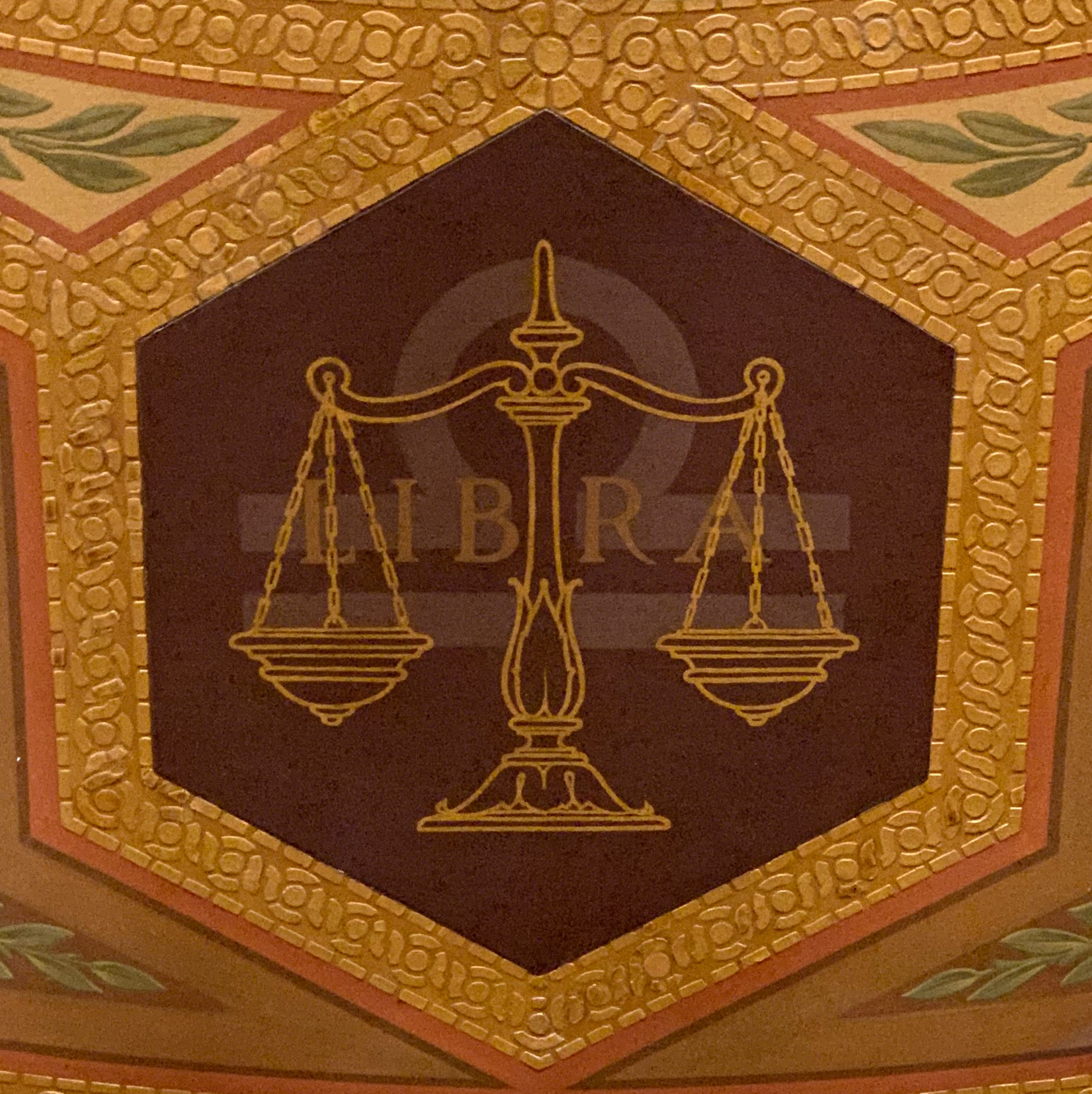
- Zodiac symbol: Scales
- Duration (tropical, western): September 23 – October 23 (2026, UT1)
- Constellation: Libra
- Zodiac element: Air
- Zodiac quality: Cardinal
- Sign ruler: Venus, Eris (modern)
- Detriment: Mars
- Exaltation: Saturn
- Fall: Sun

Libra (♎︎; Ancient Greek: Ζυγός, romanized: Zygós, Latin for "scales") is the seventh astrological sign in the zodiac. It spans 180°–210° celestial longitude. The Sun transits this sign on average between September 24 and October 23. The symbol of the scales is based on the Scales of Justice held by Themis, the Greek personification of 'ancient sacred law'. She became the inspiration for modern depictions of Lady Justice. The ruling planet of Libra is Venus along with Taurus. Libra is the only zodiac sign that is represented by an object; the other eleven signs are represented by either an animal or a mythological character though some depictions feature a man holding the scales with his hands.

== Astrological associations ==
Libra is the cardinal modality of the three air signs, the others being Gemini and Aquarius. Libra is symbolized by the scales and is associated with the Roman deity Iustitia. According to the writer Manilius, Roman judges are born under the sign of Libra.

The Moon was said to be in Libra when Rome was founded and this was based on the historical passage, which state "qua condita Roma". Everything was balanced under this righteous sign. Manilius once said that Libra was the sign "in which the seasons are balanced" (Astronomica, 1.267), cf. Virgil, Georg. I.208-9: "Libra die somnique pares ubi fecerit horas / et medium luci atque umbris iam diuidit orbem,...". Both the hours of the day and the hours of the night match each other, hence the September equinox. Thus, why the Romans put so much trust in the "balanced sign". Going back to ancient Greek times, Libra the constellation between Virgo and Scorpio used to be ruled over by the constellation of Scorpio. They called the area the Latin word "chelae", which translated to "the claws" which can help identify the individual stars that make up the full constellation of Libra, since it was so closely identified with the Scorpion constellation in the sky.

== Gallery ==
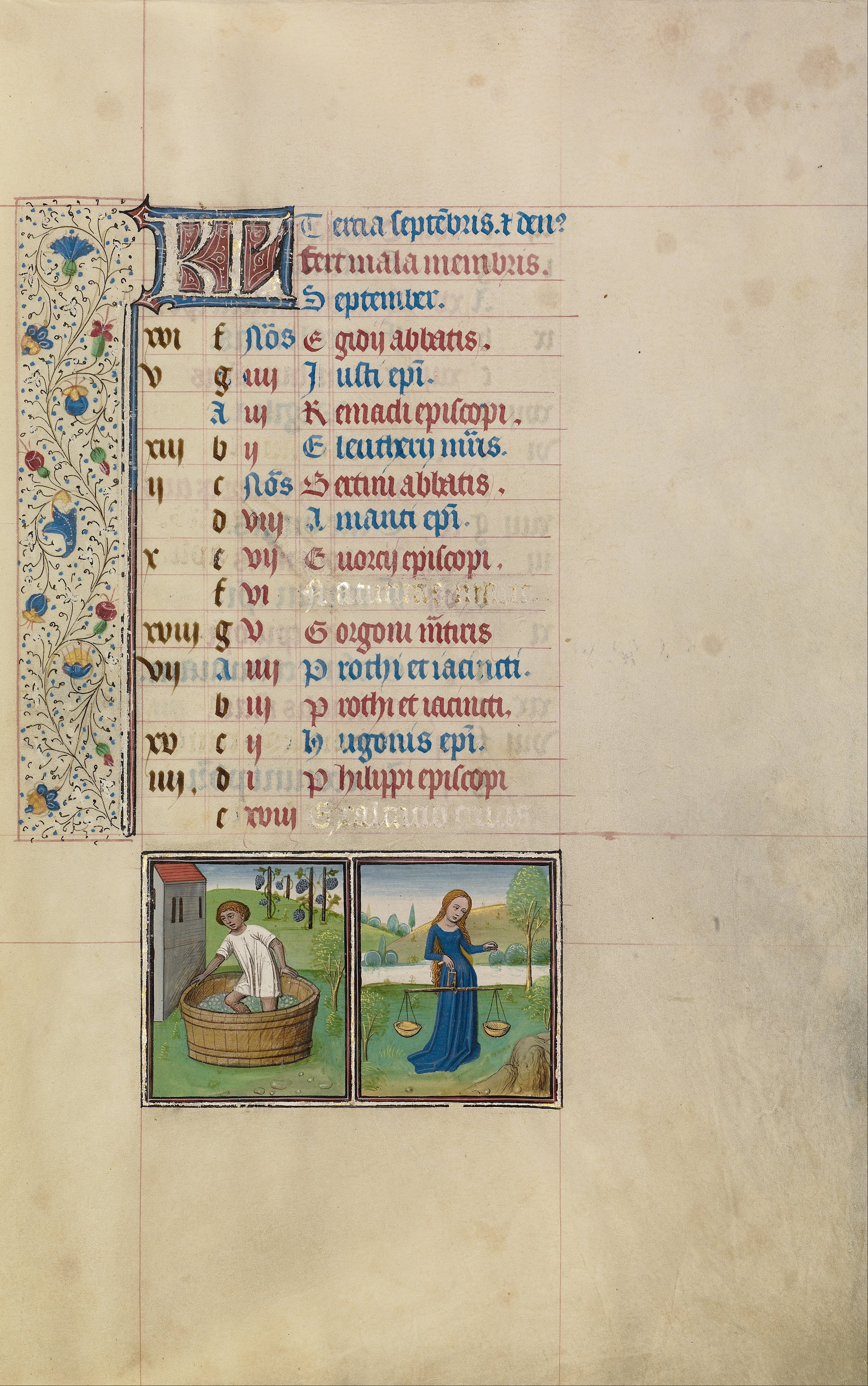
Illustration of Libra in a Flemish manuscript from the early 1460s

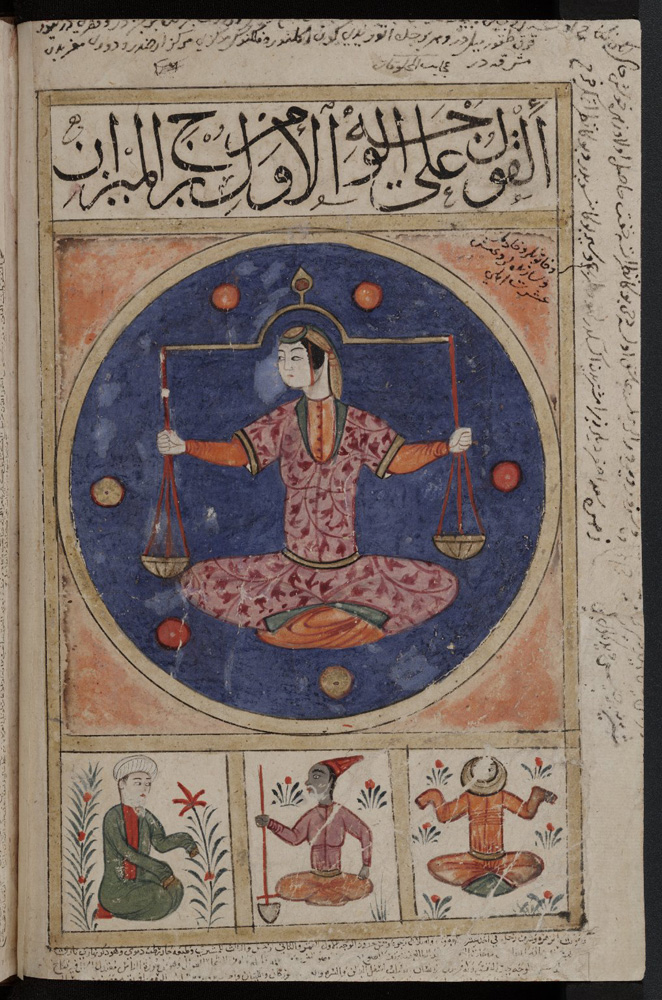
Libra, or al-Mīzān, depicted in the 14th/15th century Arabic astrological text Book of Wonders

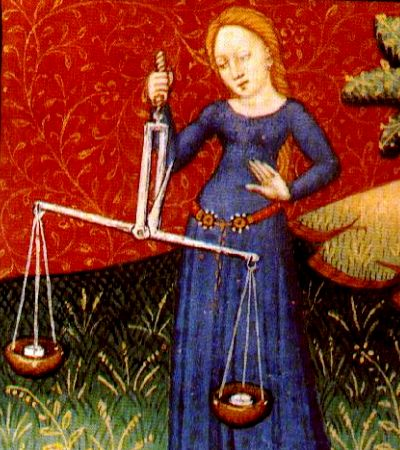
A woman holding the scales (Book of Hours, the Fastolf Master, Bodleian Library)

== See also ==
- Astronomical symbols
- Chinese zodiac
- Circle of stars
- Cusp (astrology)
- Elements of the zodiac
- Hindu astrology
- History of astrology
- Air (classical element)

== Works cited ==
- Astronomical Applications Department (2011). Multiyear Computer Interactive Almanac. 2.2.2. Washington DC: US Naval Observatory. Longitude of Sun, apparent geocentric ecliptic of date, interpolated to find time of crossing 0°, 30°....
- "Horoscopes, Tarot, Psychic Readings". www.astrology.com. Archived from the original on September 23, 2015.
- "Libra". Britannica.
- Käppel, Lutz (2009). "Themis". In Cancik, Hubert; Schneider, Helmuth (eds.). Brill's New Pauly: encyclopaedia of the ancient world. Vol. 14. Brill. pp. 424–425.
- Ridpath, Ian (n.d.). "Star Tales – Libra". www.ianridpath.com.
- Shapiro, Lee (1977). "The real constellations of the zodiac". International Planetarium Society.
- Tatum, Jeremy B. (June 2010). "The Signs and Constellations of the Zodiac". Journal of the Royal Society of Canada. 104 (3): 103–104. Bibcode:2010JRASC.104..103T.
