= Cazimi and combustion =

Astrological conditions describing a planet's proximity to the Sun

In astrology, cazimi and combustion are conditions describing the proximity of a classical planet to the Sun in a horoscope. A planet very close to the Sun was traditionally said to be cazimi, or "in the heart of the Sun", and was interpreted as strengthened. At a somewhat greater distance it was considered combust and therefore weakened or obscured by the Sun. A third and less severe condition is known as being under the Sun's beams.

The doctrines developed from the observable disappearance of planets in the Sun's glare near solar conjunction. Their astrological interpretations, however, differ from the astronomical description of planetary visibility.

== Definitions ==
The boundaries vary among historical authorities. In the system described by the English astrologer William Lilly, the conditions are:

Proximity to the Sun in Lilly's system
Condition	Angular separation from the Sun	Traditional interpretation
Cazimi	Within 17 arcminutes	Strengthened by being "in the heart of the Sun"
Combust	More than 17 arcminutes but less than 8°30′	Severely weakened or overpowered
Under the Sun's beams	From 8°30′ to 17°	Obscured and weakened, but less severely than when combust

Lilly also required a combust planet to occupy the same zodiacal sign as the Sun. He considered combustion more severe when the Sun was applying to conjunction with the planet than when it was separating from it.

Earlier sources did not always use the same limits. Some late antique and early medieval authorities allowed an orb of approximately one degree for the condition later called cazimi, whereas Al-Qabisi and several later medieval authors used the narrower limit of about 16 arcminutes. Consequently, the precise classification of a planet may depend on the historical system being followed.

== Terminology and history ==
The word cazimi entered medieval Latin astrological terminology from the Arabic expression ka-ṣamīmī, meaning "as if in the heart". It referred to a planet situated in the "heart of the Sun". The corresponding Greek expression, meaning "in the heart", occurs in late antique astrology, and the doctrine was subsequently transmitted through Arabic astrological works into Latin Europe.

Combustion derives from the metaphor of a planet being burned by the Sun. Because a planet near conjunction is normally hidden by sunlight, traditional astrologers treated combustion as an accidental debility. Cazimi constituted an exception: extreme closeness to the Sun was interpreted not as destruction but as a position of honour and power.

The conditions were used particularly in horary, natal, and electional astrology. Their meanings and numerical limits remain matters of convention within different astrological traditions.

== See also ==
- Aspect (astrology)
- Conjunction (astronomy and astrology)
- Essential dignity
- Heliacal rising
- Inferior and superior planets
- Solar conjunction
