= Leo (astrology) =

Fifth astrological sign of the zodiac

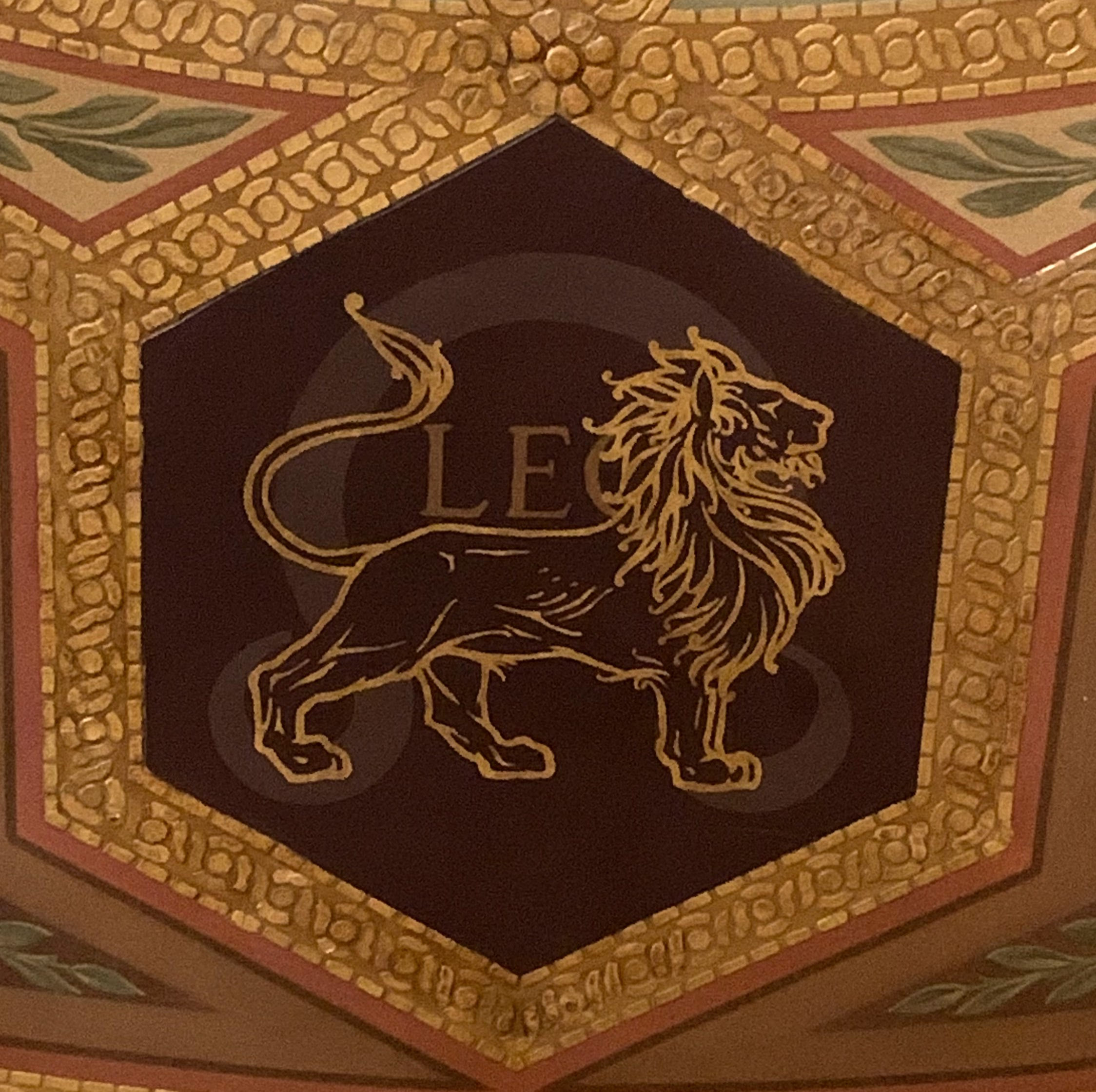
- Zodiac symbol: Lion
- Duration (tropical, western): July 22 – August 23 (2026, UT1)
- Constellation: Leo
- Zodiac element: Fire
- Zodiac quality: Fixed
- Sign ruler: Sun
- Detriment: Saturn and Uranus
- Exaltation: Neptune (in modern astrology)
- Fall: None (traditional) Pluto (in modern astrology)

Leo (♌︎; Ancient Greek: Λέων, romanized: Léōn, Latin for "lion") is the fifth sign of the zodiac. It corresponds to the constellation Leo and comes after Cancer and before Virgo. The traditional Western zodiac associates Leo with the period between about July 24 and August 23, and the sign spans the 120th to 150th degree of celestial longitude.

Leo is associated with fire, accompanied by Aries and Sagittarius, and its modality is fixed. In Greek mythology, the constellation is created by Zeus in commemoration of his son Heracles' completion of his first labour, the defeat of the Nemean lion. The lion is a very important and prominent symbol in Greek mythology.

== History ==
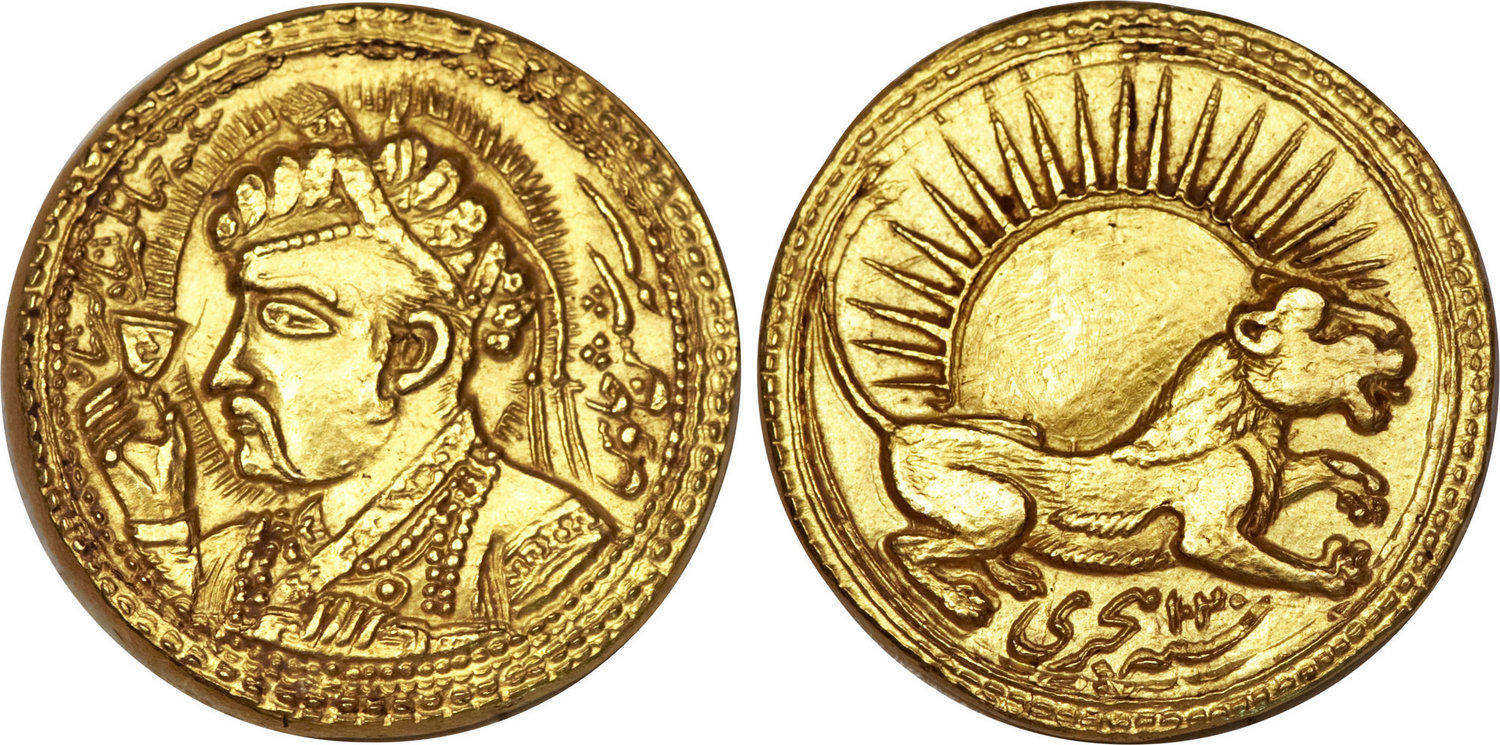
Leo on the reverse of the gold coin of Jahangir of India

Egyptians worshipped the constellation, which they referred to as "Knem", because it was present during the flooding of the Nile River. This event signified plentiful harvests for the upcoming year, and the people interpreted it as a gift from the earth. Ruler of Egypt, Tutankhamun's gold throne features lion heads where the seat and front legs meet, as well as clawed feet at the end of each leg, symbolizing power and royalty.

== See also ==
- Astronomical symbols
- Chinese zodiac
- Circle of stars
- Cusp (astrology)
- Elements of the zodiac
- Fire (classical element)

== Sources ==
- Astronomical Applications Department (2011). Multiyear Computer Interactive Almanac. 2.2.2. Washington DC: US Naval Observatory. Longitude of Sun, apparent geocentric ecliptic of date, interpolated to find time of crossing 0°, 30°....
- March, Jenny, "Labor I: The Nemean Lion", in The Oxford Handbook of Heracles, pp. 29–44, edited by Daniel Ogden, Oxford University Press, 2021. ISBN 978-0-190-65101-5.
- "Leo". Britannica. August 11, 2023.
- "Myth about Heraclese and the Nemean Lion". Windows to the Universe. Arlington, Virginia: National Science Teachers Association. 2012.
- Tatum, Jeremy B. (June 2010). "The Signs and Constellations of the Zodiac". Journal of the Royal Society of Canada. 104 (3): 103–104. Bibcode:2010JRASC.104..103T.
