= Aries (astrology) =

First astrological sign of the zodiac

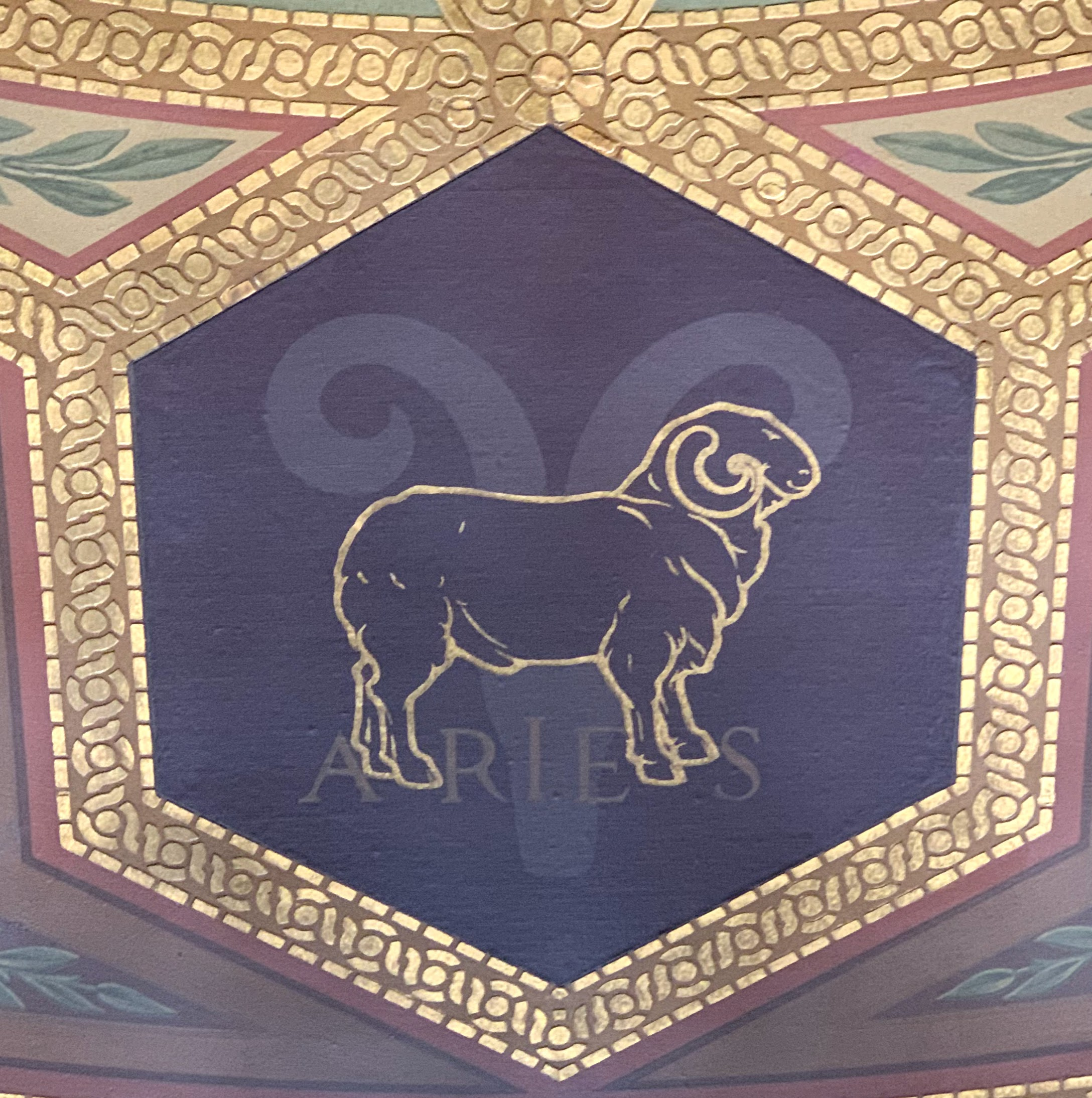
- Zodiac symbol: Ram
- Duration (tropical, western): March 20 – April 20 (2026, UT1)
- Constellation: Aries
- Zodiac element: Fire
- Zodiac quality: Cardinal
- Sign ruler: Mars
- Detriment: Venus, Eris
- Exaltation: Sun
- Fall: Saturn

Aries (♈︎; Ancient Greek: Κριός, romanized: Kriós, Latin: Ariēs, lit. 'ram') is the first astrological sign in the zodiac, spanning the first 30 degrees of celestial longitude (0°≤ λ <30°), and originates from the constellation Aries. Under the tropical zodiac, the Sun transits this sign from approximately March 21 to April 20 each year. This time-duration is exactly the first month of the Solar Hijri calendar (Arabic: Hamal; Persian: Farvardin; Pashto: Wray).

According to the tropical system of astrology, the Sun enters the sign of Aries when it reaches the March equinox, typically on March 21. Because the Earth takes approximately 365.24 days to go around the Sun, the precise time of the equinox is not the same each year, and generally will occur about six hours later from one year to the next until reset by a leap year. The leap day February 29 causes that year's March equinox to fall about eighteen hours earlier compared with the previous year.

== Background ==
Aries is one of the twelve of the zodiac signs and it is one of the four modality cardinals of the zodiac. Aries is one of the three fire signs in the zodiac, along with Leo and Sagittarius. The ruling planet is Mars. Individuals born while the Sun is in this sign may be called Ariens. The color for Aries is red. The opposite zodiac sign to Aries is Libra.

The equivalent in the Hindu calendar is Meṣa.

== Mythology ==
In Greek mythology, the symbol of the ram is based on the Chrysomallus, the flying ram that rescued Phrixus and Helle, the children of the Boeotian king Athamas and provided the Golden Fleece. Beyond the association to the planet Mars, there is no link between Aries and Ares, the god of war, often pictured with a vulture and whose origin possibly stems from ἀρή (arē), the Ionic form of the Doric ἀρά (ara), "bane, ruin, curse, imprecation", though this is thought improbable by Beekes.

== Gallery ==
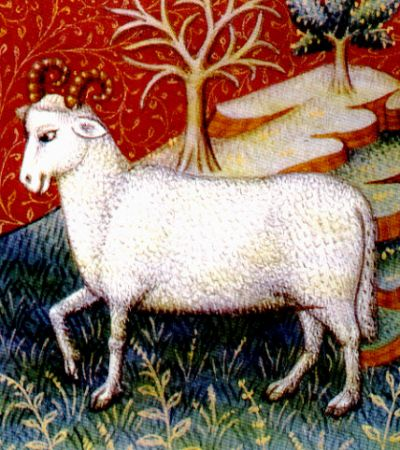
Aries in the Book of Hours by the Fastolf Master, Bodleian Library, Oxford, c. 1440–1450

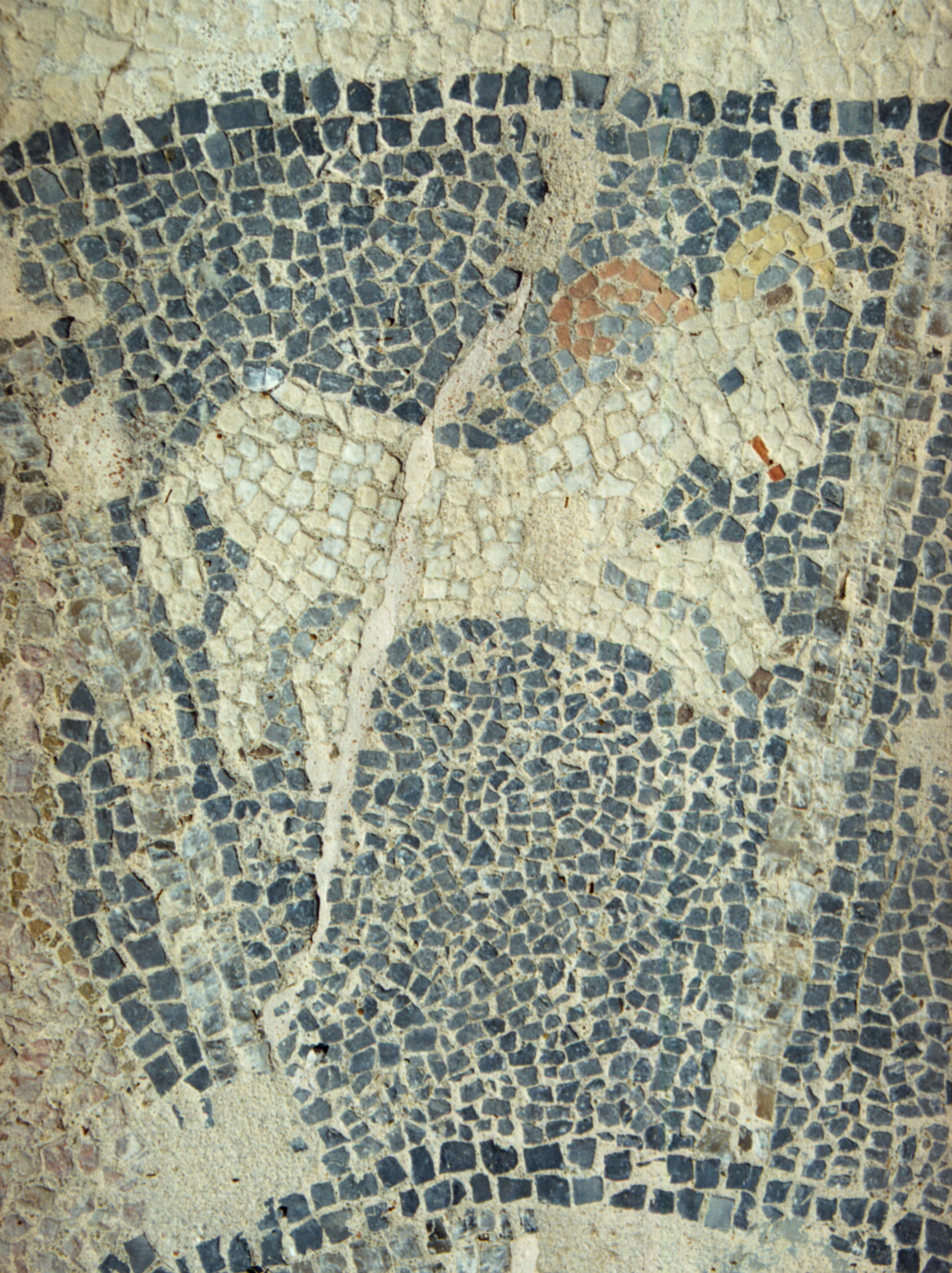
Mosaic in Maltezana near Analipsi, Astypalaia, Greece, 5th century CE

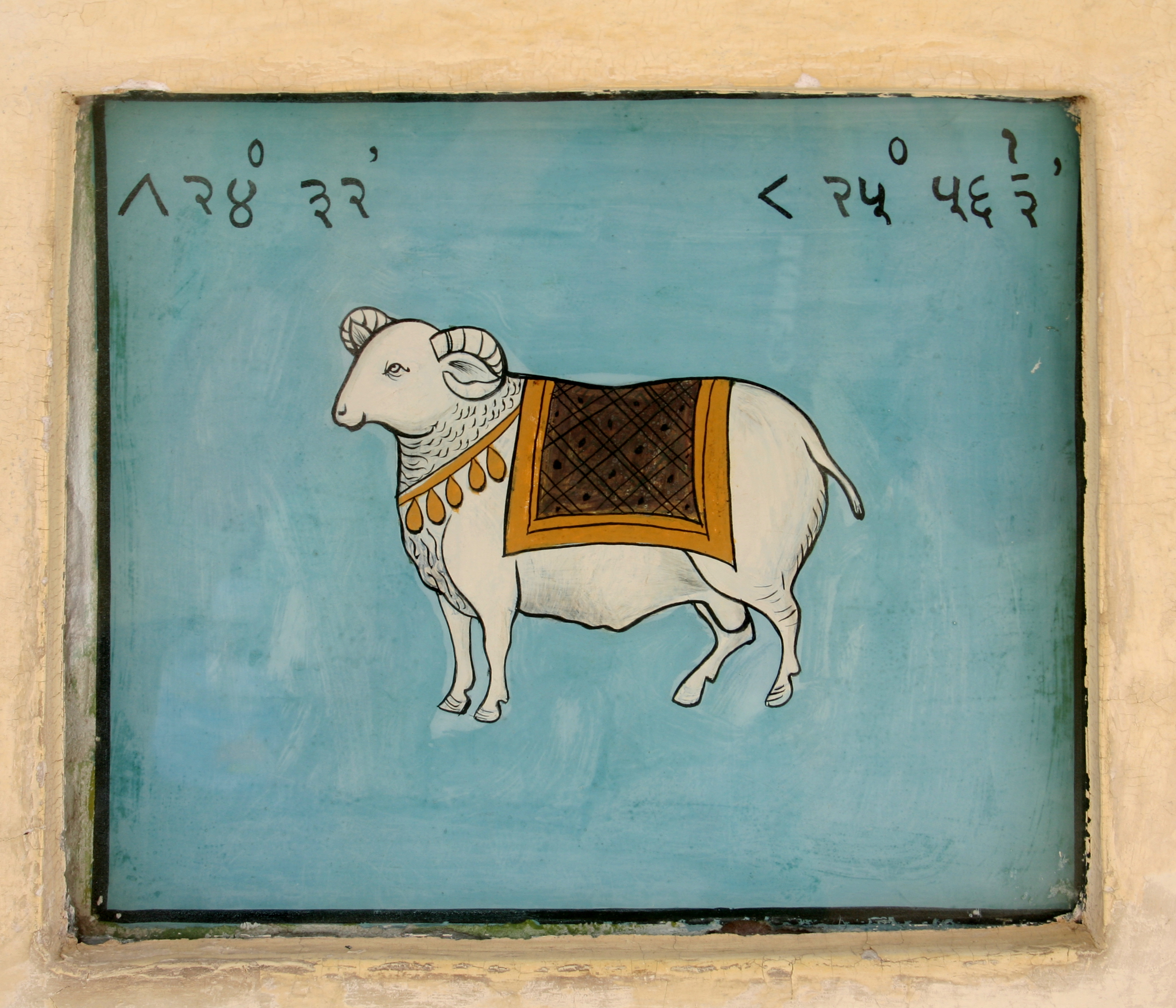
Aries zodiac sign, Jantar Mantar, Jaipur, India, 18th century CE

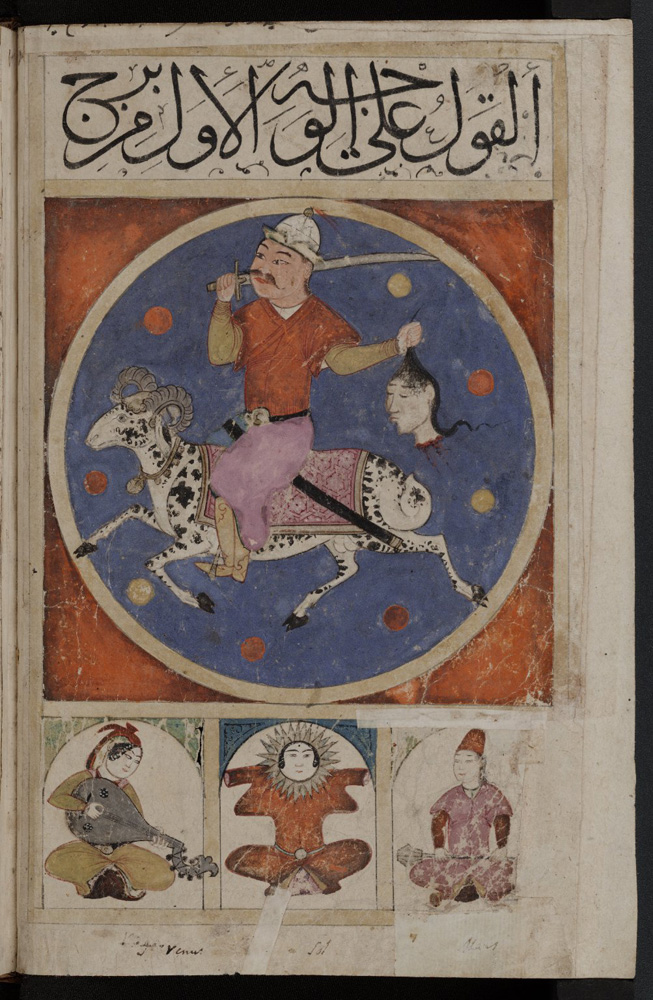
Aries, or al-ħamal, depicted in the 14th/15th century Arabic astrology text Book of Wonders

== See also ==
- Astronomical symbols
- Chinese zodiac
- Circle of stars
- Cusp (astrology)
- Elements of the zodiac
- History of astrology
- Fire (classical element)
