= Triplicity =

Three signs with same element

In astrology, a triplicity is a group of three signs belonging to the same element.

== Trines ==
Astrology assumes that each sign of the same triplicity is 120 degrees apart, forming angles to one another called trines, which are each equivalent to the 360 degrees of the circle divided by three. Trines are considered to be very powerful and yet very comfortable, free-flowing connections. This suggests that the signs in each element are very comfortable and compatible with one another and tend to have many of the same qualities in common.

== Method of organization ==
In traditional astrology, the concept of triplicity embodied several factors concerning the four classical elements and were considered of particular importance. Besides the four classical elements, two other ways triplicity could be organized were by rulership type and by season. However, neither are given much attention by modern astrologers. However, astrology by season, in particular has been adopted by astrologers who practice in modern Neopaganism, Druidism and Wicca.

=== Classical elements ===
Four Classical Elements; this classic diagram has two squares on top of each other, with the corners of one being the classical elements, and the corners of the other being the properties

In traditional Western astrology there are four triplicities based on the classical elements. Beginning with the first sign Aries which is a Fire sign, the next in line Taurus is Earth, then to Gemini which is Air, and finally to Cancer which is Water—in Western astrology the sequence is always Fire, Earth, Air, & Water in that exact order. This cycle continues on twice more and ends with the twelfth and final astrological sign, Pisces. The elemental rulerships for the twelve astrological signs of the zodiac (according to Marcus Manilius) are summarized as follows:

- Fire — Aries, Leo, Sagittarius - hot, dry
- Earth — Taurus, Virgo, Capricorn - cold, dry
- Air — Gemini, Libra, Aquarius - hot, wet
- Water — Cancer, Scorpio, Pisces - cold, wet

=== Rulerships ===
In traditional astrology, each triplicity has several planetary rulers, which change with conditions of sect—that is, whether the chart is a day chart or a night chart.

Triplicity rulerships are a very important essential dignity—one of the several factors used by traditional astrologers to weigh the strength, effectiveness and integrity of each planet in a chart. Many Hellenistic astrologers (for example, Dorotheus of Sidon) considered triplicity rulership the most powerful and demonstrable of the several essential dignities of a planet.

Triplicity rulerships (using the "Dorothean system") are as follows:

Triplicity	Day Ruler	Night Ruler	Participating Ruler
Fire (Aries, Leo, Sagittarius):	Sun	Jupiter	Saturn
Earth (Taurus, Virgo, Capricorn):	Venus	Moon	Mars
Air (Gemini, Libra, Aquarius):	Saturn	Mercury	Jupiter
Water (Cancer, Scorpio, Pisces):	Venus	Mars	Moon

* (Ptolemy later modified the rulerships of Water triplicity, making Mars the ruler of the water triplicity for both day and night charts--and William Lilly concurred.)

One way in which triplicity rulerships were used by earlier astrologers was to divide a person's life into three periods: early, middle, and late. The condition of the triplicity ruler that is in sect in the chart is evaluated when considering the tenor of the early part of life; the ruler out of sect is examined for the middle of life; and the last third of life is evaluated by looking at the condition of the participating triplicity ruler. "Participating" rulers were not used after the Hellenistic period.

In medieval systems of astrology, each essential dignity was given a different weight. Domicile rulers were given 5 points of weight; exaltation rulers were given 4 points; and triplicity rulers were assigned 3 points of weight. This gives some idea of how much power medieval astrologers accorded to each essential dignity.

=== Actual seasons ===
Traditional astrology also organizes triplicities according to the actual season in which the zodiac rose. For example, Aries, Taurus, and Gemini appear during the spring season.

The triplicities of seasonal elements in ancient astrology were the following:

- Spring - Aries - Taurus - Gemini (March 21 and June 21)
- Summer - Cancer - Leo - Virgo (June 22 and September 22)
- Autumn - Libra - Scorpio - Sagittarius (September 23 and December 21)
- Winter - Capricorn - Aquarius - Pisces (December 22 and March 20)

In the Southern Hemisphere, it is reversed.

- Spring - Libra, Scorpio, Sagittarius (September 23 and December 21)
- Summer - Capricorn - Aquarius - Pisces (December 22 and March 20)
- Autumn - Aries - Taurus - Gemini (March 21 and June 21)
- Winter - Cancer - Leo - Virgo (June 22 and September 22)

== See also ==
- Astrology and the classical elements
