= Taurus (astrology) =

Second astrological sign of the zodiac

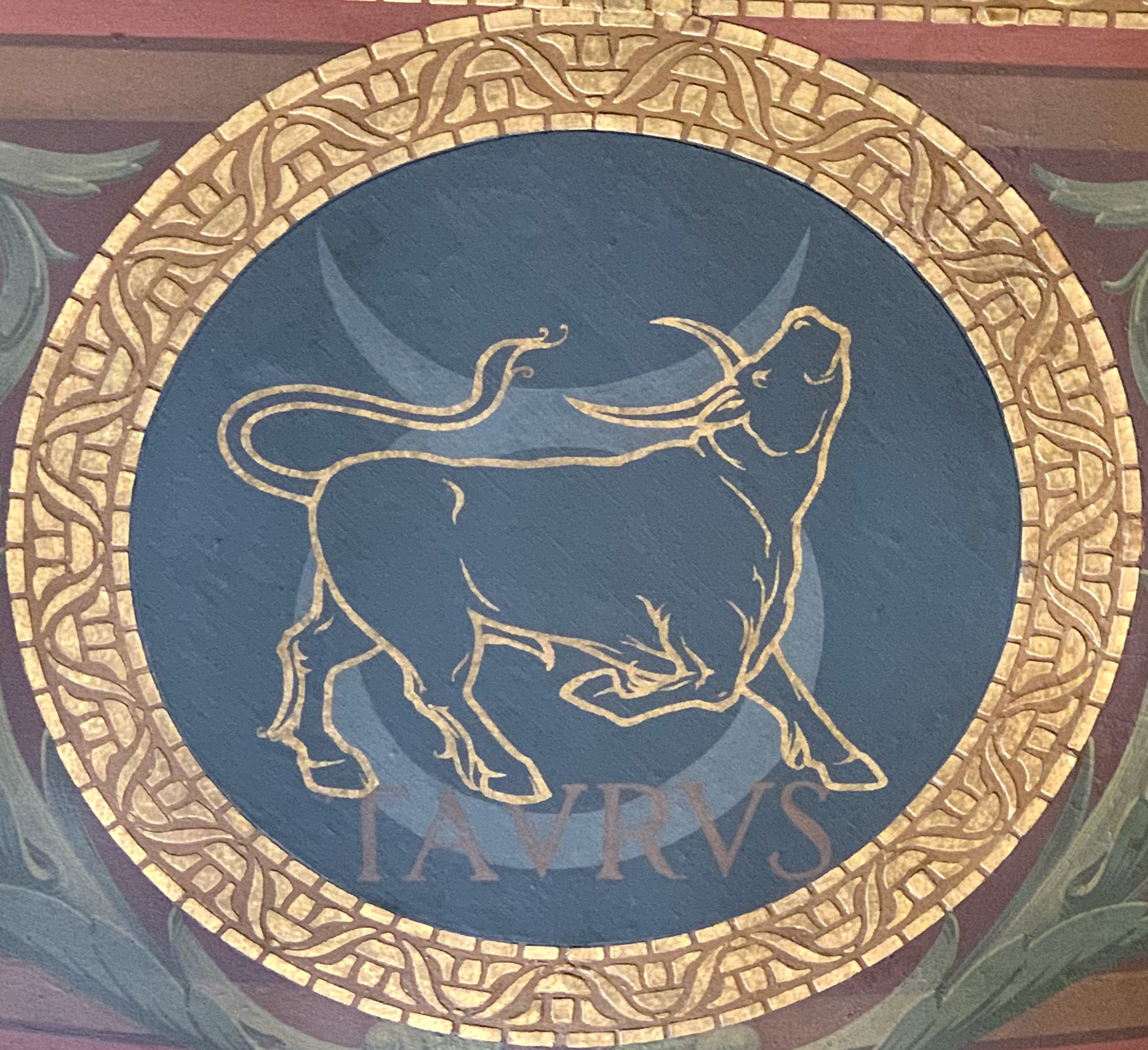
- Zodiac symbol: Bull
- Duration (tropical, western): April 20 – May 21 (2026, UT1)
- Constellation: Taurus
- Zodiac element: Earth
- Zodiac quality: Fixed
- Sign ruler: Venus
- Detriment: Mars and Pluto
- Exaltation: Moon
- Fall: Uranus

Taurus (♉︎; Ancient Greek: Ταῦρος, romanized: Taûros, Latin for "bull") is the second astrological sign in the modern zodiac. It spans from 30° to 60° of the zodiac. This sign belongs to the Earth element or triplicity, as well as a fixed modality, quality, or quadruplicity. It is a Venus-ruled sign, the Moon is in its exaltation here at exactly 3°. Taurus is one of the three earth signs, alongside Capricorn and Virgo. Taurus's opposite sign is Scorpio.

The Sun transits this zodiac sign from approximately April 21 until May 21 in western astrology. This time-duration roughly corresponds to the second month of the Solar Hijri calendar called Ordibehesht (Pashto: Ǧwayai).

== History ==
The bestial sign of Taurus is associated with several myths and bull worship from several ancient cultures. It was the first sign of the zodiac established among the Mesopotamians, who called it "The Great Bull of Heaven", as it was the constellation through which the Sun rose on the vernal equinox at that time, that is the Early Bronze Age, from about 4000 BC to 1700 BC. The equivalent in the Hindu calendar is Vṛṣabha.

The zodiac sign of Taurus does not entirely align with the constellation of Taurus. Taurus represents the 30 degrees following Aries in the zodiac circle. Aries marks the beginning of spring and new life, while Taurus, a fixed sign, continues and stabilizes what Aries started. During Taurus, life reaches its full bloom, symbolizing growth and steadfastness.

== Astrological associations ==
Earth is the element associated with Taurus, and alongside Virgo and Capricorn, it forms the Earth triplicity.

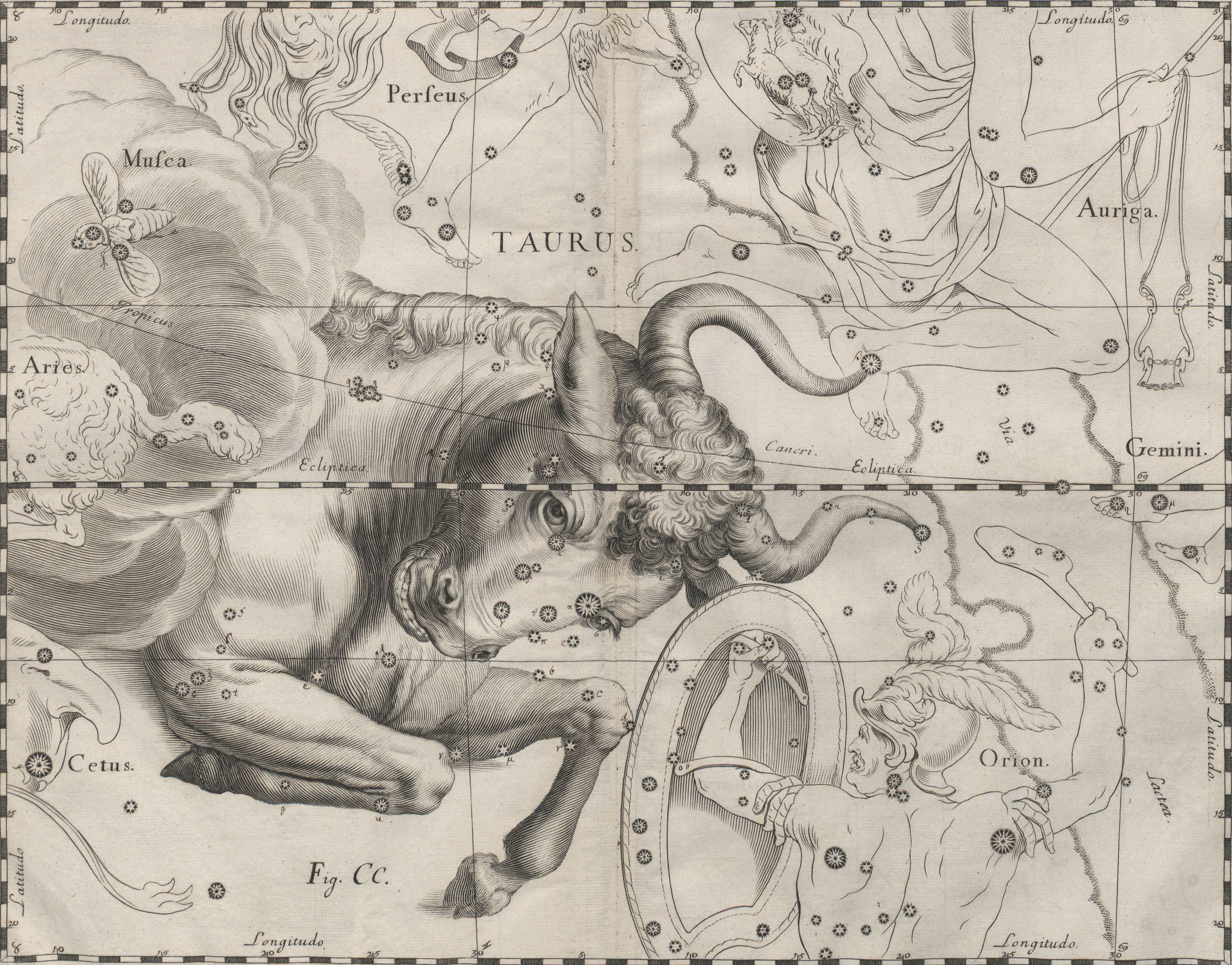

== See also ==
- Astronomical symbols
- Chinese zodiac
- Circle of stars
- Cusp (astrology)
- Elements of the zodiac
- Earth (classical element)
- Hindu astrology
