= Cancer (astrology) =

Fourth astrological sign of the zodiac

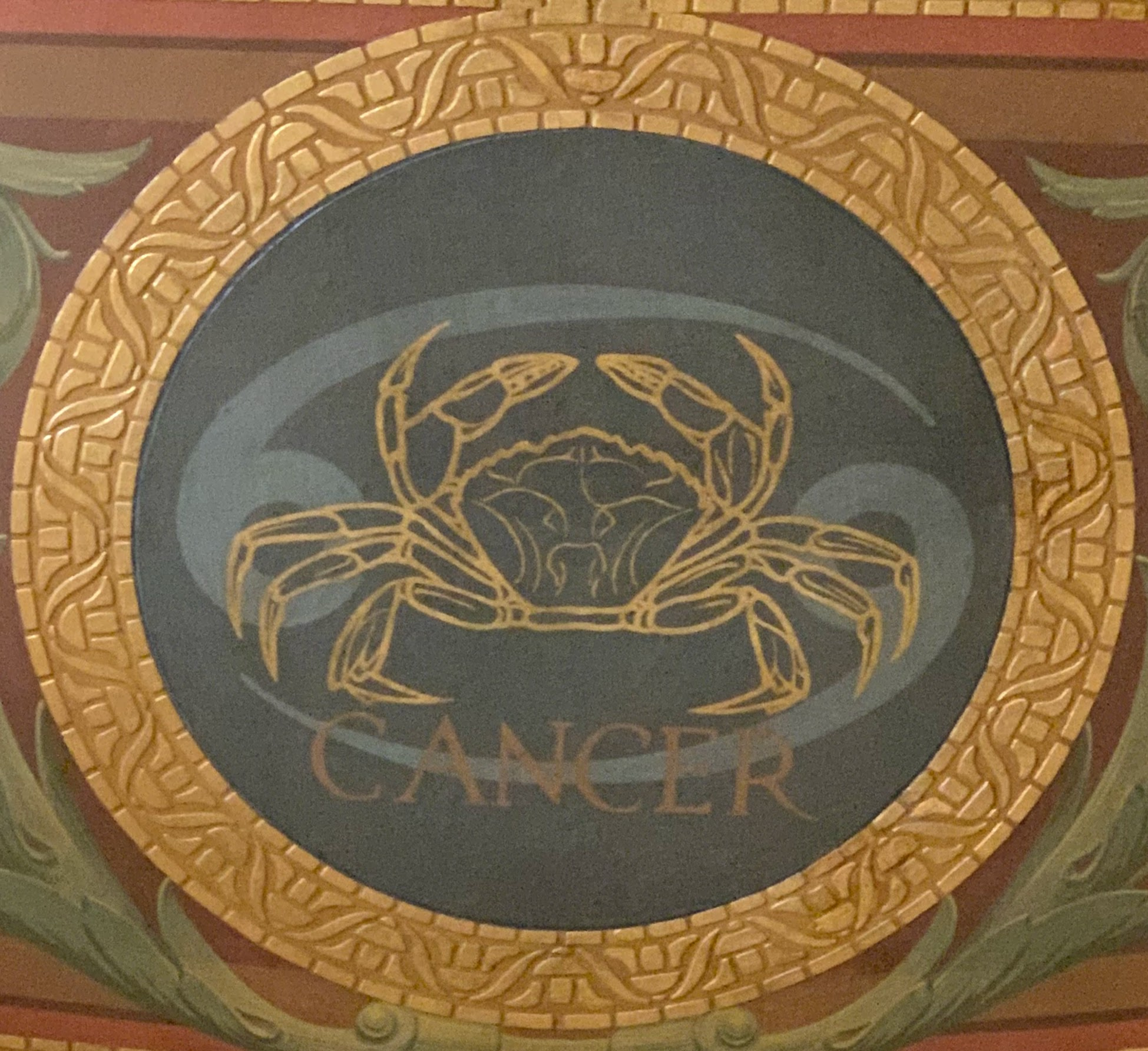
- Zodiac symbol: Crab
- Duration (tropical, western): June 21 – July 22 (2026, UT1)
- Constellation: Cancer
- Zodiac element: Water
- Zodiac quality: Cardinal
- Sign ruler: Moon
- Detriment: Saturn
- Exaltation: Jupiter
- Fall: Mars

Cancer (♋︎; Ancient Greek: Καρκίνος, romanized: Karkínos, lit. 'crab', Latin for the "Crab") is the fourth astrological sign in the zodiac, originating from the constellation of Cancer. It spans from 90° to 120° celestial longitude. Under the tropical zodiac, the Sun transits this area between approximately June 22 and July 23.

In astrology, Cancer is the cardinal sign of the Water trigon, which is made up of Cancer, Pisces, and Scorpio. It is one of the six negative signs, and its ruling planet is the Moon. Though some depictions of Cancer feature a lobster, crayfish, scarab beetle or a turtle, the sign is most often represented by the crab, based on the Karkinos. In Swedish the sign is named "kräftan" which means "crayfish". In Dutch and Afrikaans the sign is called "kreeft" and "kreef" respectively which translates to "lobster". Cancer's opposite sign is Capricorn.

== Background ==
Cancer is the fourth sign of the zodiac, which the sun enters at the summer solstice in the Northern Hemisphere Those who are born from approximately June 21 to July 22 (depending upon the year) are born under Cancer. Individuals born during these dates, depending on which system of astrology they subscribe to, may be called "Cancerians". Cancer is a northern sign, and its opposite sign is Capricorn. Cancer is a cardinal sign.

Water is the element associated with Cancer, and, alongside Scorpio and Pisces, it forms the water trigon. The water trigon is one of four elemental trigons in the zodiac, with the other three being fire, earth, and air. When a trigon is influential, it is said to affect changes on earth. Cancer is said to be the house of Neptune and the exaltation of Jupiter, both astronomical bodies over those born under Cancer. Its ruling planet is the Moon. Due to the negative associations of the word "Cancer" with the disease of the same name, some astrologers refer to persons born under this sign as "moon children".

Divine associations with Cancer in Renaissance astrology are Luna/Diana, both goddesses that represent the Moon, Cancer's ruling planet.

In Hindu astrology, the sign of Cancer is named Karka and its ruler is Moon.

=== Early history ===
"Cancer" is an ancient word of Indo-European origin, derived from a root meaning "to scratch." In ancient Egypt, the sign of Cancer was conceived as a scarab beetle, while in Mesopotamia it was represented by a turtle. In each case, the animal representative of the sign was perceived as "pushing" the sun across the heavens, initiating the summer solstice.

Latin cancer is the generic word for 'crab'. According to Greek myth, the symbol of Cancer—often a crab, though sometimes a lobster—is based on the Karkinos (Greek: "Cancer"), a crab crushed under the foot of Heracles, and whose remains were placed in the sky by Hera, forming the Cancer constellation. In Roman variations of the story, it is Juno—Hera's counterpart in Roman mythology—who places the crab in the sky. Naturalist Richard Hinckley Allen, in 1899, deemed Cancer the "most inconspicuous figure in the zodiac," adding that its mythology "apologizes for its being there by the story that when the Crab was crushed by Hercules, for pinching his toes during a contest with the Hydra in the Marsh of Lerna, Juno exalted it to the sky."

== In the arts ==
During the Middle Ages, the zodiacal symbol of Cancer was included in devotional books and incorporated into monumental sculptures. The depiction of Cancer as a crab is most prevalent in Mediterranean and Western European art.

In Dante Alighieri's Paradiso, he makes reference to Cancer, writing:

Thereafterward a light among them brightened,
So that, if Cancer one such crystal had,
Winter would have a month of one sole day.

— Dante Alighieri, Paradiso

Cancer is figured in Giovanni Maria Falconetto's 1517 painting, Cancer, as the guardian of the city of Verona. The Cancer symbol is also depicted in Agostino di Duccio's sculpture View of Rimini Under the Sign of Cancer (1450). In Giorgio Vasari's fresco, the Chamber of Fortune, Cancer is represented in the northern compartment of the ceiling, pictured by Diana, holding the moon, along with a crab.

== Gallery ==
Cultural and historical depictions of Cancer
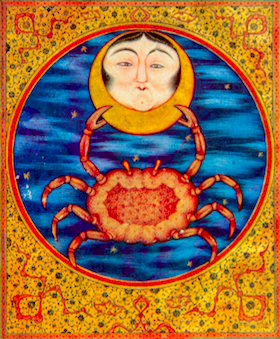
Supplément turc. 242, fol. 14v - Osman, Cancer c. 1582

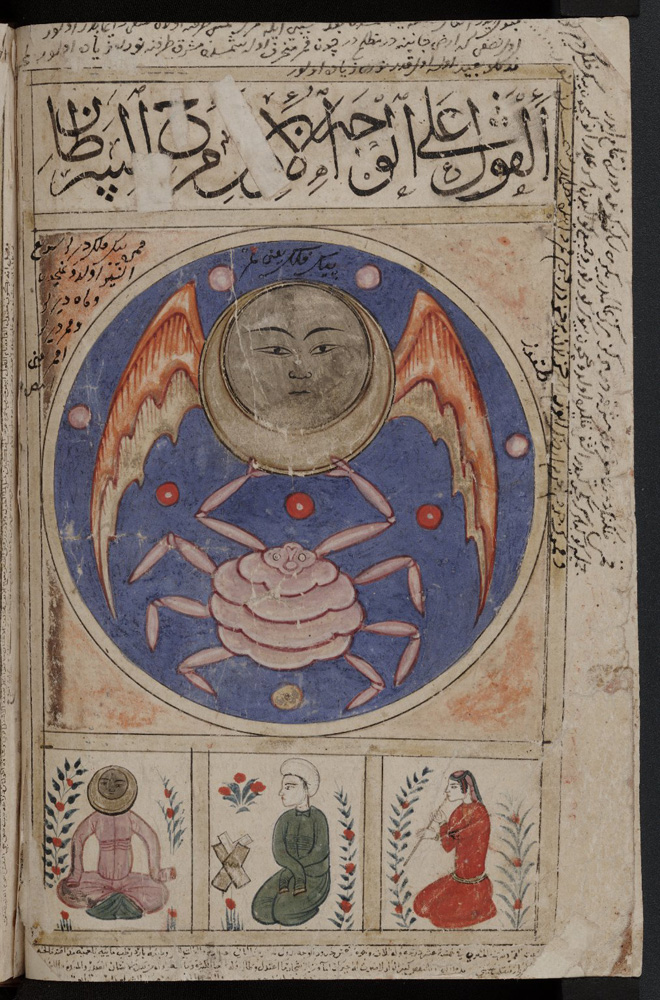
In the 14th c. Arabic manuscript, Book of Wonders

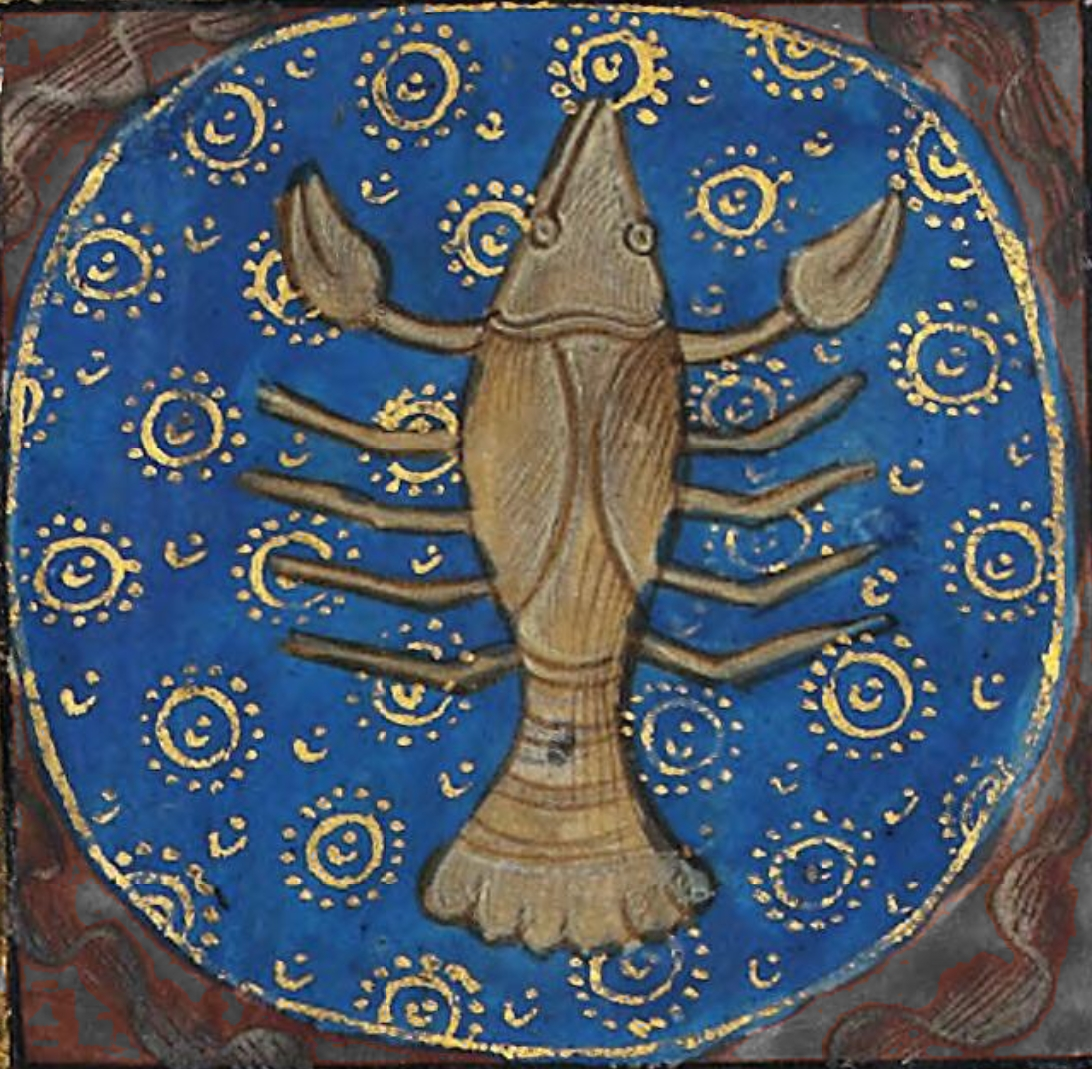
In Llyfr Llyfr Oriau 'De Grey (De Grey Hours), c. 1390

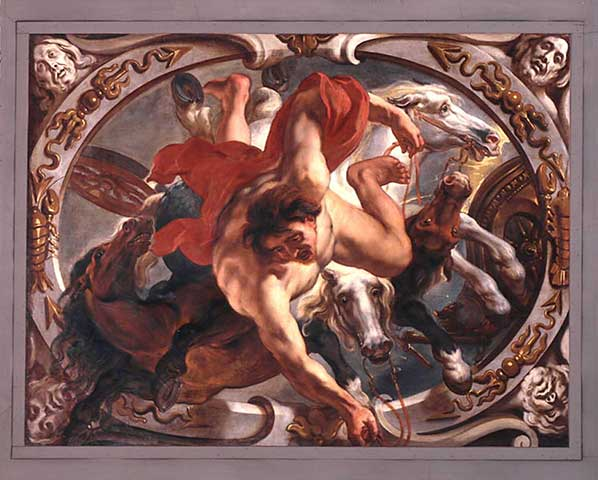
In Jacob Jordaens's Les Signes du Zodiaque, c. 1640

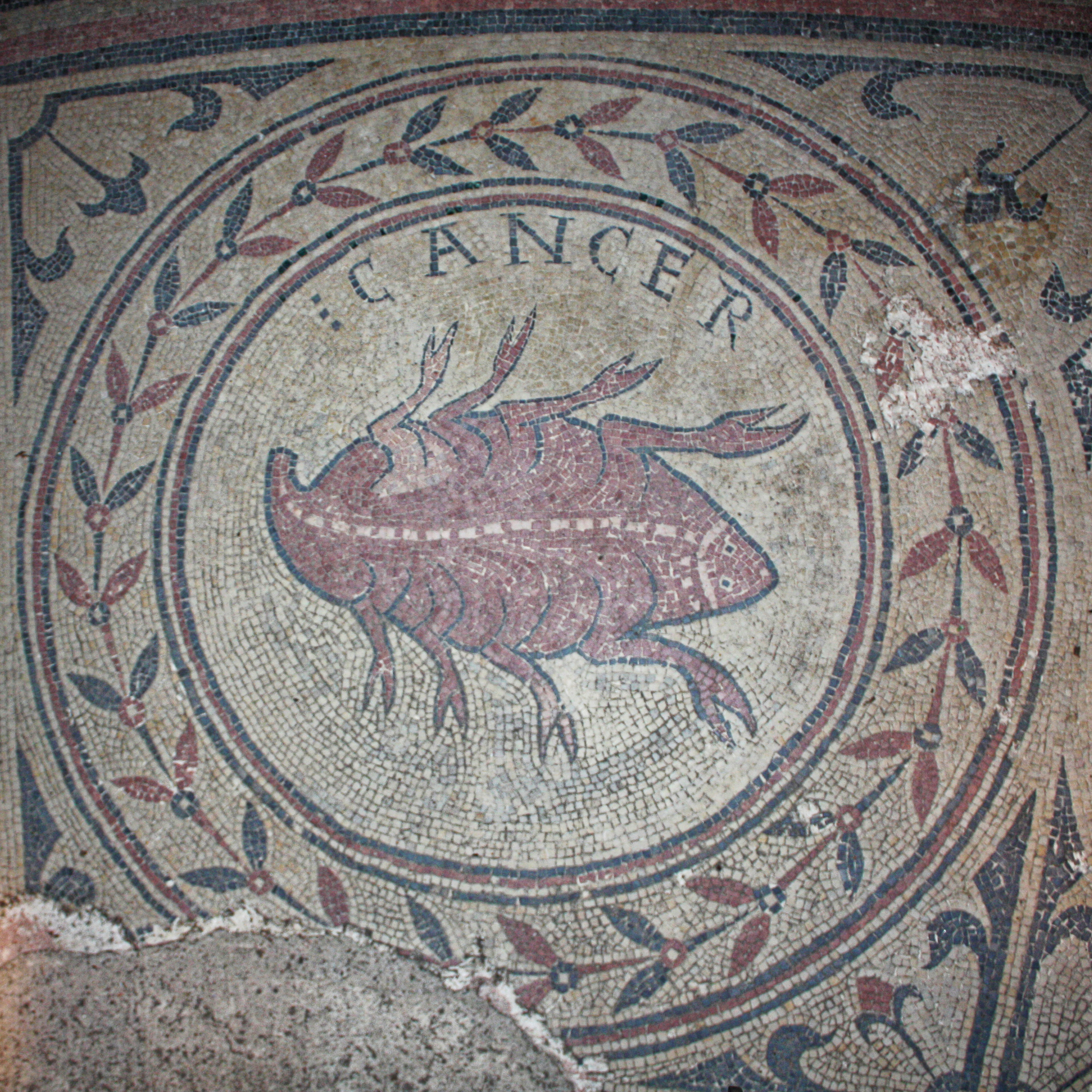
Mosaic in the Saint-Philibert de Tournus, Saône-et-Loire, France

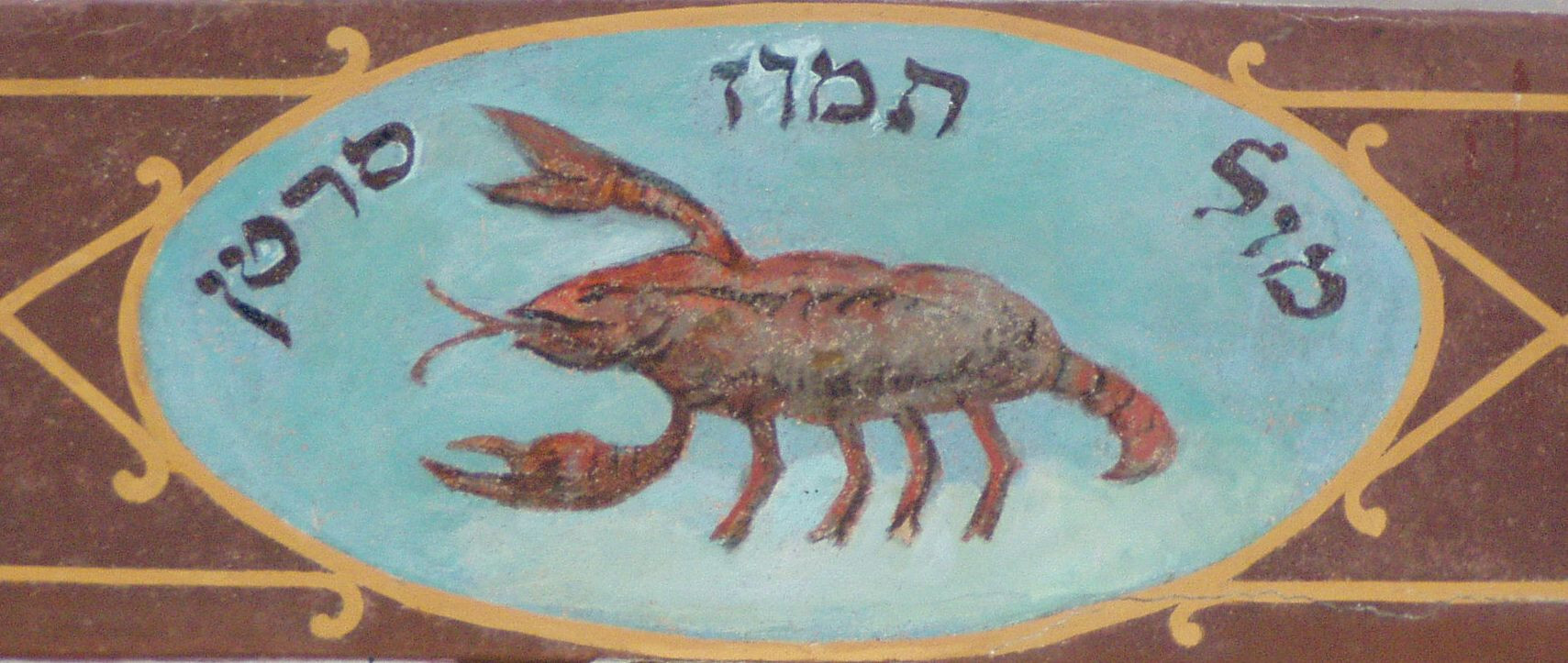
Mural in the Kupa Synagogue, Kraków, Poland

== See also ==
- Astronomical symbols
- Chinese zodiac
- Circle of stars
- Cusp (astrology)
- Elements of the zodiac
- Hindu astrology
- Water (classical element)

== Sources ==
- Algeo, John; Butcher, Carmen Acevedo (2014). The Origins and Development of the English Language (7th ed.). Boston: Wadsworth. ISBN 9781133307273.
- Allen, Richard Hinckley (1899). The Star-Names and Their Meanings. New York City, New York: G.E. Stechert.
- Astronomical Applications Department (2011). Multiyear Computer Interactive Almanac. 2.2.2. Washington DC: US Naval Observatory. Longitude of Sun, apparent geocentric ecliptic of date, interpolated to find time of crossing 0°, 30°....
- Battistini, Matilde (2007). Astrology, Magic, and Alchemy in Art (A Guide to Imagery). J. Paul Getty Museum. ISBN 978-0-892-36907-2.
- Charak, K.S. (1996). Elements of Vedic Astrology. Vol. 1. Systems Vision. ISBN 9788190100809.
- Cheney, Liana (2007). Giorgio Vasari's Teachers: Sacred & Profane Art. New York City, New York: Peter Lang. ISBN 978-0-820-48813-4.
- Harkness, Deborah E. (1999). John Dee's Conversations with Angels: Cabala, Alchemy, and the End of Nature. Cambridge, England: Cambridge University Press. ISBN 978-0-521-62228-8.
- Lilly, William (1835). An Introduction to Astrology, Rules For the Practice of Horary Astrology [an abstract of Christian astrology]: To Which Are Added, Numerous Emendations, by Zadkiel. Oxford, England: Oxford University.
- The Merriam-Webster New Book of Word Histories. Springfield, Mass.: Merriam-Webster. 1991. ISBN 0877796033.
- Shoemaker, Mrs. Mabel (McGeorge) (1904). Astrology. Philadelphia, Pennsylvania: Penn Publishing Company.
- Simmonite, William Joseph (2015) [1896]. Horary Astrology: The Key To Scientific Prediction, Being The Prognostic Astronomer. Andesite Press [Harvard College Library]. ISBN 978-1-296-83282-7.
- Smith, Robert Cross (1828). A Manual of Astrology, by Raphael. Oxford, England: Oxford University.
- Spiller, Jan; McCoy, Karen (1988). Spiritual Astrology: A Path to Divine Awakening. New York City, New York: Simon & Schuster. ISBN 978-1-439-12420-8.
- Tatum, Jeremy B. (June 2010). "The Signs and Constellations of the Zodiac". Journal of the Royal Society of Canada. 104 (3): 103–104. Bibcode:2010JRASC.104..103T.
