= Capricorn (astrology) =

Tenth astrological sign of the zodiac

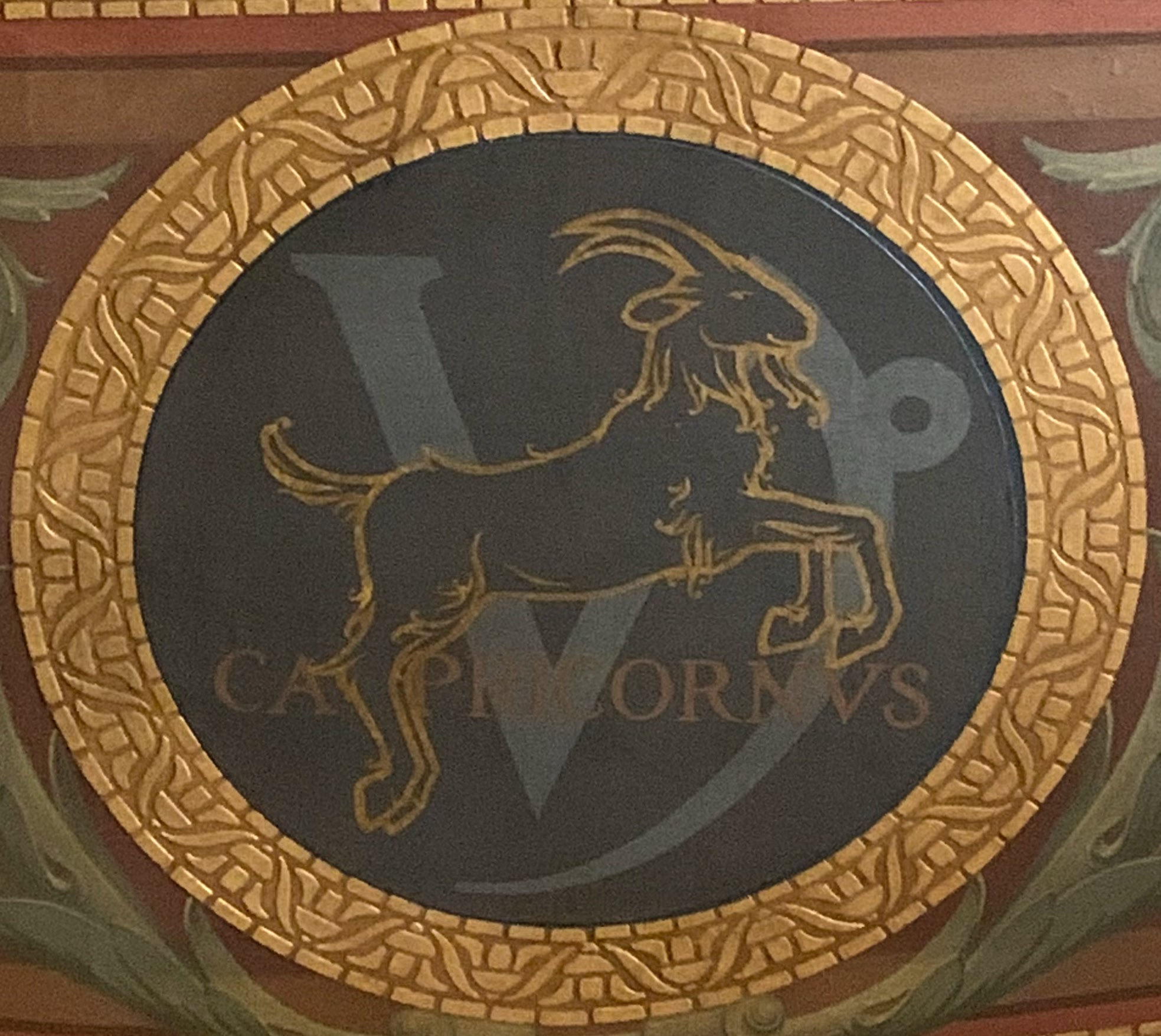
- Zodiac symbol: Sea goat
- Duration (tropical, western): December 21 – January 20 (2026, UT1)
- Constellation: Capricornus
- Zodiac element: Earth
- Zodiac quality: Cardinal
- Sign ruler: Saturn
- Detriment: Moon
- Exaltation: Mars
- Fall: Jupiter

Capricorn (♑︎; Ancient Greek: Αιγόκερως, romanized: Aigókerōs, Latin for "horned goat") is the tenth astrological sign in the zodiac out of twelve total zodiac signs, originating from the constellation of Capricornus, the goat. It spans the 270–300th degree of the zodiac, corresponding to celestial longitude. Under the tropical zodiac, the sun transits this area from around December 22 to January 20. Capricorn is one of the three earth signs, alongside Virgo and Taurus, a negative sign, and one of the four cardinal signs. Capricorn is ruled by the planet Saturn and its opposite sign is Cancer.

== Cultural significance ==
In India, the zodiac sign of Capricorn is celebrated as the Makara Sankranti festival, also known in Nepal as Maghe Sankranti. The festival is celebrated on either of January 13, 14 or 15 every year, when, per the Indian astronomical calendar, the Sun enters the sign of Capricorn.

== Gallery ==
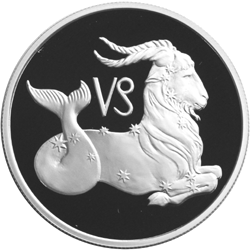

== See also ==
- Astronomical symbols
- Chinese zodiac
- Circle of stars
- Cusp (astrology)
- Elements of the zodiac
- Hindu astrology
- Makara
- Earth (classical element)
