= Gemini (astrology) =

Third astrological sign of the zodiac

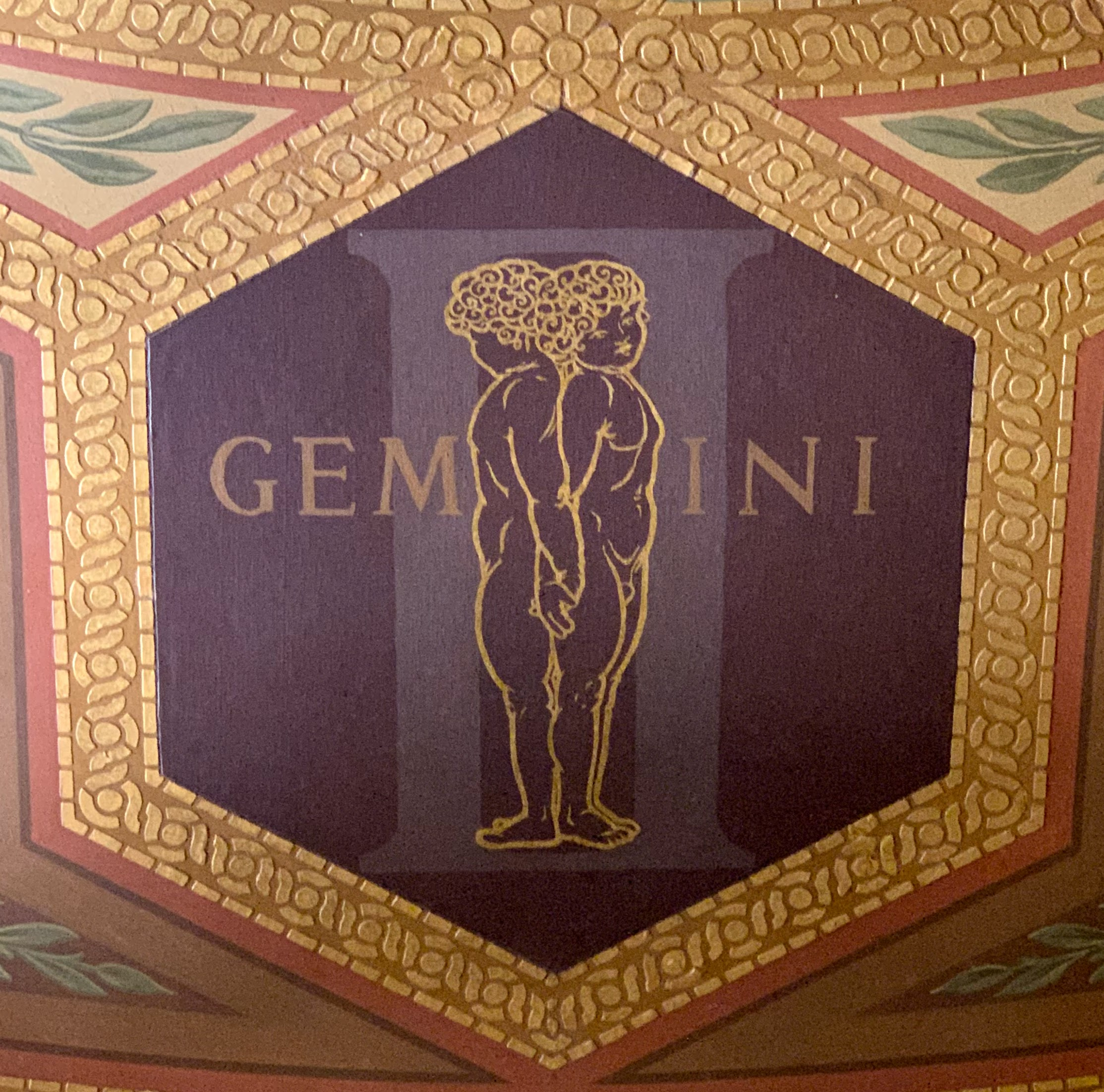
- Zodiac symbol: Twins
- Duration (tropical, western): May 21 – June 21 (2026, UT1)
- Constellation: Gemini
- Zodiac element: Air
- Zodiac quality: Mutable
- Sign ruler: Mercury
- Detriment: Jupiter
- Exaltation: North Node, Ceres
- Fall: South Node, Eris

Gemini (♊︎; /ˈdʒɛmɪnaɪ/ JEM-in-eye Greek: Δίδυμοι, romanized: Dídymoi, Latin for "twins") is the third astrological sign in the zodiac. Under the tropical zodiac, the sun transits this zodiac sign between about May 22 to June 21. Gemini is represented by the twins, Castor and Pollux, known as the Dioscuri in Greek mythology. It is known as a positive, mutable sign. The opposite sign of Gemini is Sagittarius.

== Mythology ==
In Babylonian astronomy, the stars Pollux and Castor were known as the Great Twins. Their names were Lugal-irra and Meslamta-ea, meaning "The Mighty King" and "The One who has arisen from the Underworld". Both names are titles of Nergal. Also could be referencing Zeus and Hades.

In Greek mythology, Gemini is associated with the myth of Castor and Pollux, a pair of twins conceived by different fathers. Zeus, who seduced Leda and conceived Pollux while Tyndareus, the king of Sparta and Leda's husband, conceived Castor. When Castor died, because he was a mortal, Pollux begged his father Zeus to give Castor immortality, which was done through uniting them together in the heavens.

== In popular culture ==
NASA named its two-person space capsule Project Gemini after the zodiac sign because the spacecraft could carry two astronauts.

Google named its current family of large language models, which launched in 2023, Gemini.

== Gallery ==
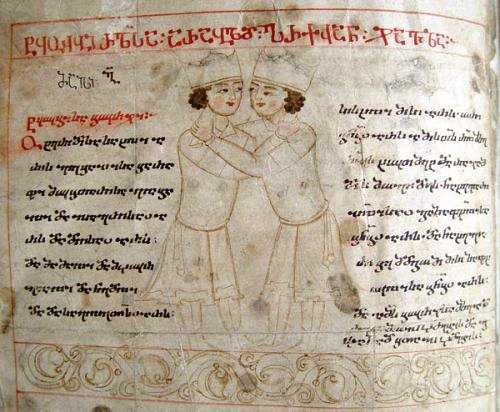
From the medieval Georgian manuscript of a 12th-century astrological treatise

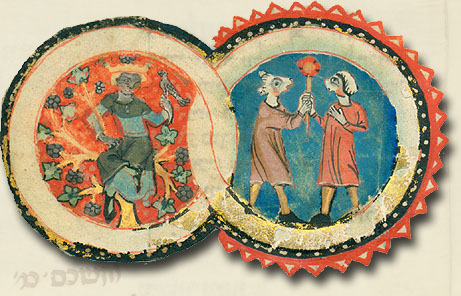
Ornamentation from an altar cloth from 13th-century Germany. The two figures are depicted with the heads of dogs.

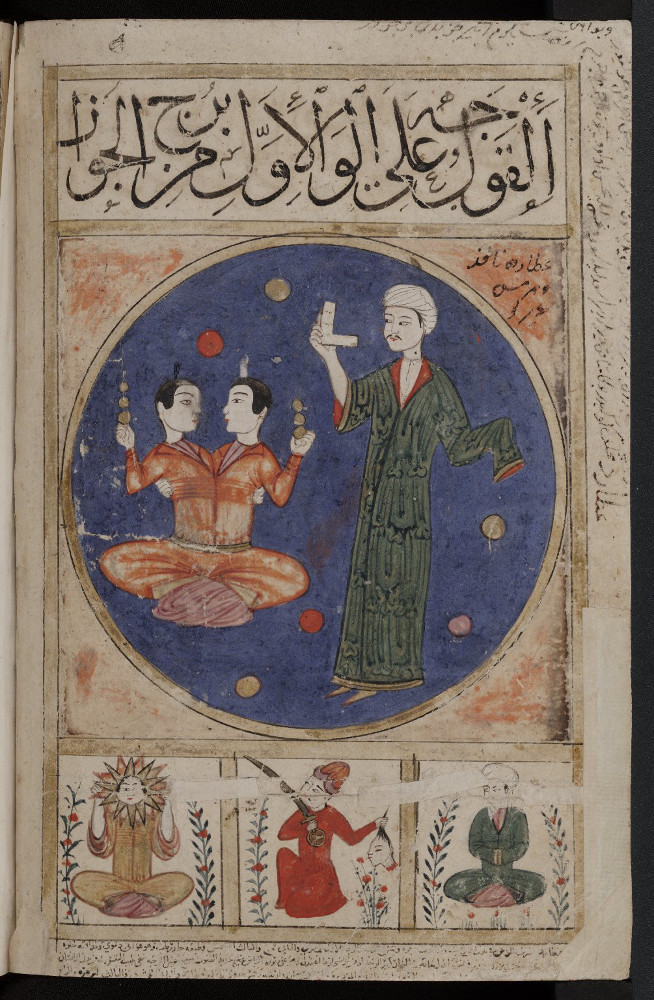
Gemini (al-Gawzaa) depicted in the 14th/15th-century Arabic astrology text Book of Wonders

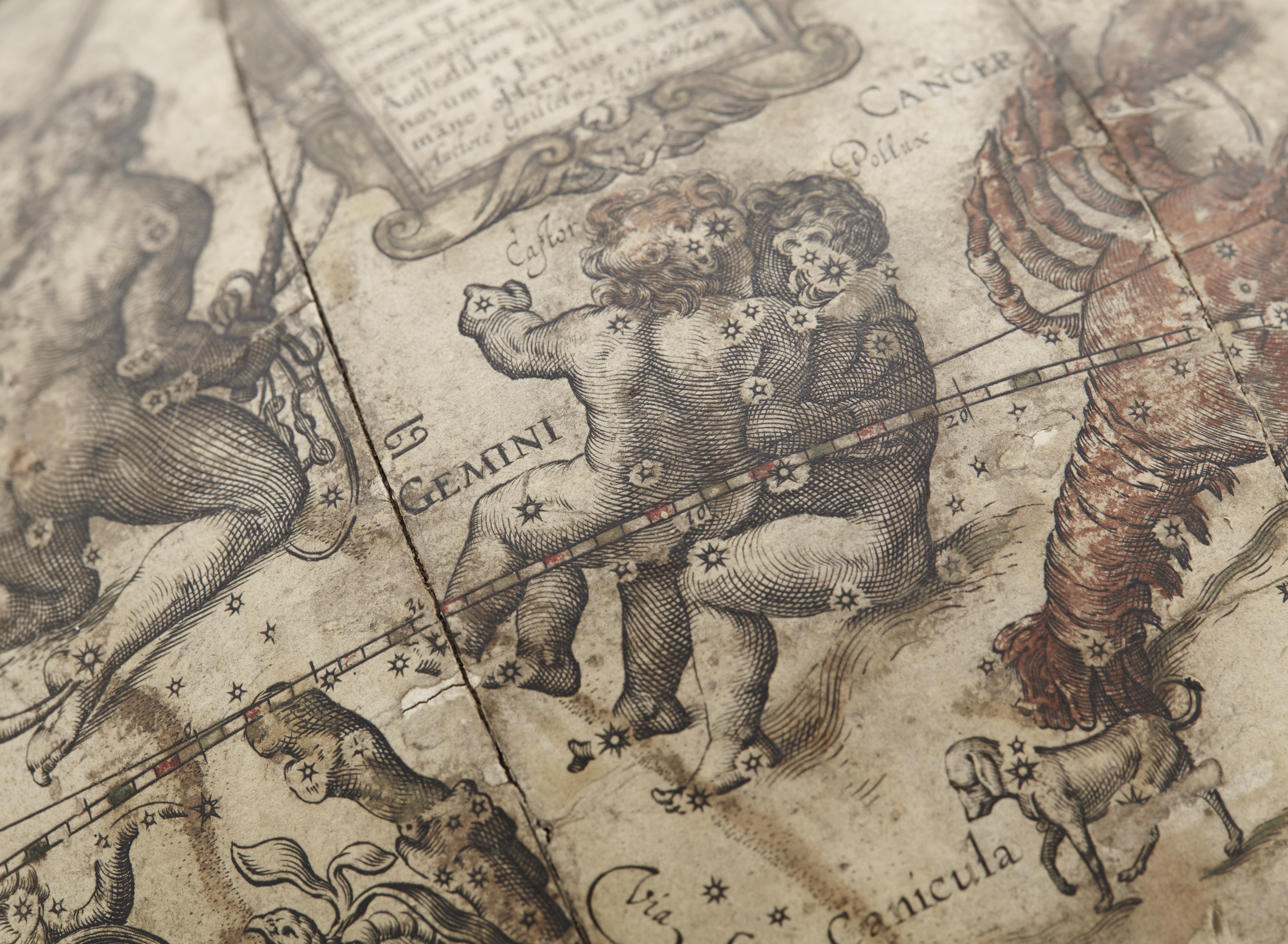
Gemini by Willem Blaeu, 1602

White and Black Geminis by Arija, 1904

== See also ==
- Astronomical symbols
- Chinese zodiac
- Circle of stars
- Cusp (astrology)
- Elements of the zodiac
- Gemini (language model)
- Digital twin
- Air (classical element)
