= Virgo (astrology) =

Sixth astrological sign of the zodiac

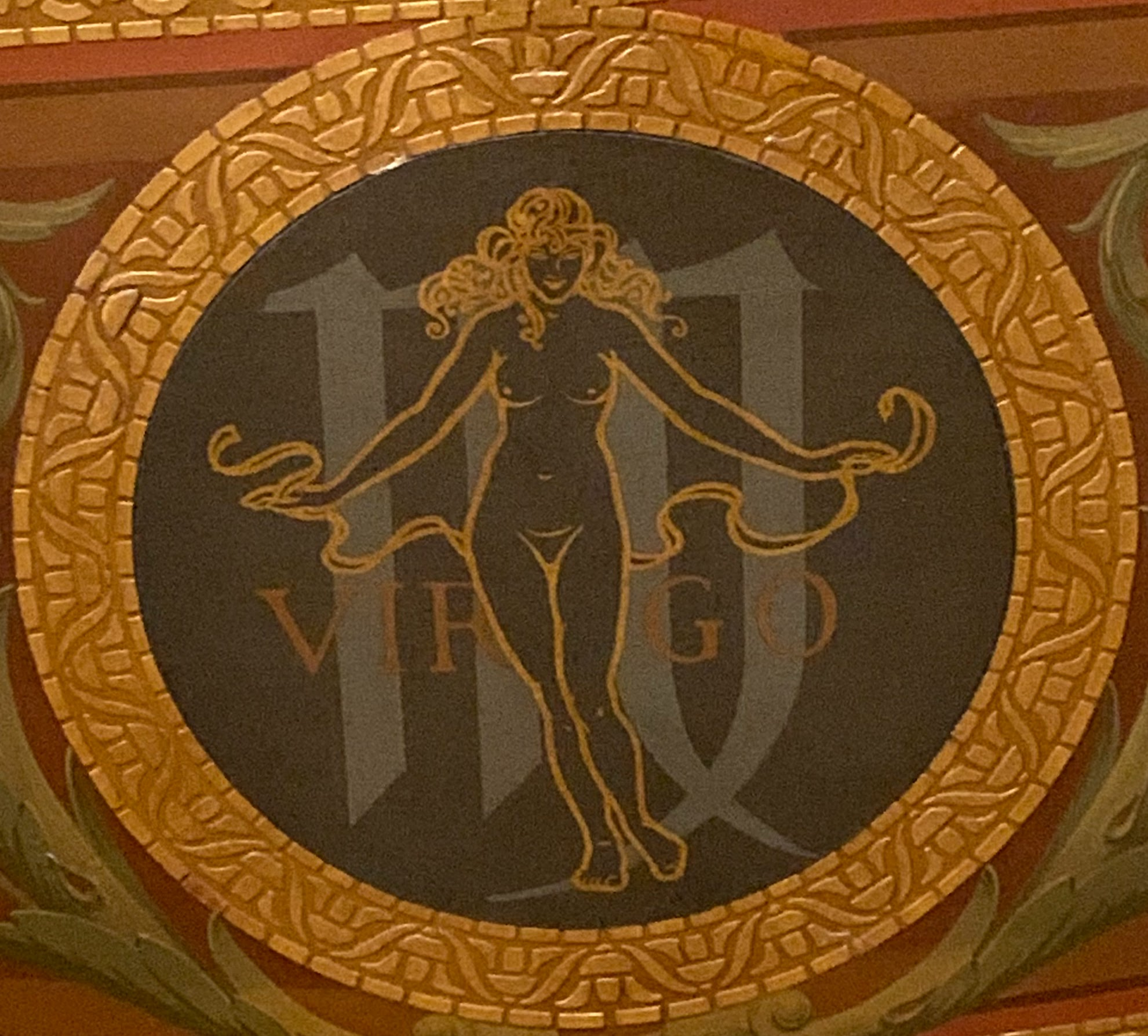
- Zodiac symbol: The Virgin (Maiden)
- Duration (tropical, western): August 23 – September 23 (2026, UT1)
- Constellation: Virgo
- Zodiac element: Earth
- Zodiac quality: Mutable
- Sign ruler: Mercury, Ceres (modern)
- Detriment: Jupiter and Neptune
- Exaltation: Mercury
- Fall: Venus

Virgo (♍︎; Greek: Παρθένος, romanized: Parthénos; Latin for "virgin" or "maiden") is the sixth astrological sign in the zodiac. It spans the 150–180th degree of the zodiac. Under the tropical zodiac, the Sun transits this area between August 24 and September 23 on average. Depending on the system of astrology, individuals born during these dates may be called Virgos or Virgoans.

The sign is associated with Astraea, a figure from Greek mythology. Astraea was the last immortal to abandon Earth at the end of the Silver Age when the gods fled to Olympus, which is why Virgo is associated with Earth. Astraea later became the constellation of Virgo. Virgo is one of the three Earth signs, alongside Capricorn and Taurus.

== Origins ==
The constellation Virgo has various origins in different mythologies. In most myths, Virgo is depicted as a virgin maiden associated with wheat. In Greek and Roman mythology, Virgo is related to Demeter, the Greek goddess of the harvest and autumn, or her daughter Persephone, queen of the Underworld and goddess of spring.

Another association is with the myth of Parthenos, which explains how the constellation Virgo came to be. According to this legend, Parthenos is the daughter of Staphylus and Chrysothemis, and sister to Rhoeo and Molpadia. Apollo impregnated Rhoeo, and upon discovering her pregnancy, her father, assuming it was from an unknown suitor, locked her in a box and cast it into a river. Parthenos and Molpadia, fearing their father’s wrath, accidentally allowed a valuable bottle of wine to be broken by one of their swine. In terror, they fled and threw themselves off a nearby cliff. Apollo saved them, placing Molpadia in Castabus, where she became the local goddess Hemithea, and Parthenos in Bubastis, where she was worshipped as a local goddess. Another version of the story posits that Parthenos was Apollo’s daughter, and the constellation commemorates her early death.

In another Greek myth, Virgo is associated with Erigone, the Athenian maiden and daughter of Icarius. After Icarius was murdered by his shepherds in a drunken rage, Erigone hanged herself in grief, and her dog Maera committed suicide. Zeus or Dionysus placed them in the sky as constellations: Erigone as Virgo, Icarius as Bootes, and Maera as Canis Minor.

In Egyptian mythology, the Sun’s presence in Virgo marked the beginning of the wheat harvest, thus linking Virgo to the wheat grain. In Christianity, the birth of Jesus to a virgin in Bethlehem is symbolically connected to Virgo.

In Hindu astrology, the comparable sign to Virgo is Kanya, which also means "maiden."

== See also ==
- Astronomical symbols
- Chinese zodiac
- Circle of stars
- Cusp (astrology)
- Elements of the zodiac
- Hindu astrology
- Earth (classical element)

== Works cited ==
- Allen, Richard Hinckley (1963). Star Names: Their Lore and Meaning. Nineola: Dover Publications. ISBN 9780486210797.
- Astronomical Applications Department (2011). Multiyear Computer Interactive Almanac. 2.2.2. Washington DC: US Naval Observatory. Longitude of Sun, apparent geocentric ecliptic of date, interpolated to find time of crossing 0°, 30°....
- Atsma, Aaron J. (c. 2015). "ASTRAEA : Greek goddess of justice".
- Rigoglioso, Marguerite (2009). "Artemis's Divine Birth Priestesshood". The Cult of Divine Birth in Ancient Greece. New York: Palgrave Macmillan.
- Tatum, Jeremy B. (June 2010). "The Signs and Constellations of the Zodiac". Journal of the Royal Society of Canada. 104 (3): 103–104. Bibcode:2010JRASC.104..103T.
- "Virgo (constellation)". Encyclopedia Britannica. n.d.
- "Virgoan – Dictionary definition and pronunciation - Yahoo! Education". Education.yahoo.com. Archived from the original on October 8, 2012.
