= Sagittarius (astrology) =

Ninth astrological sign of the zodiac

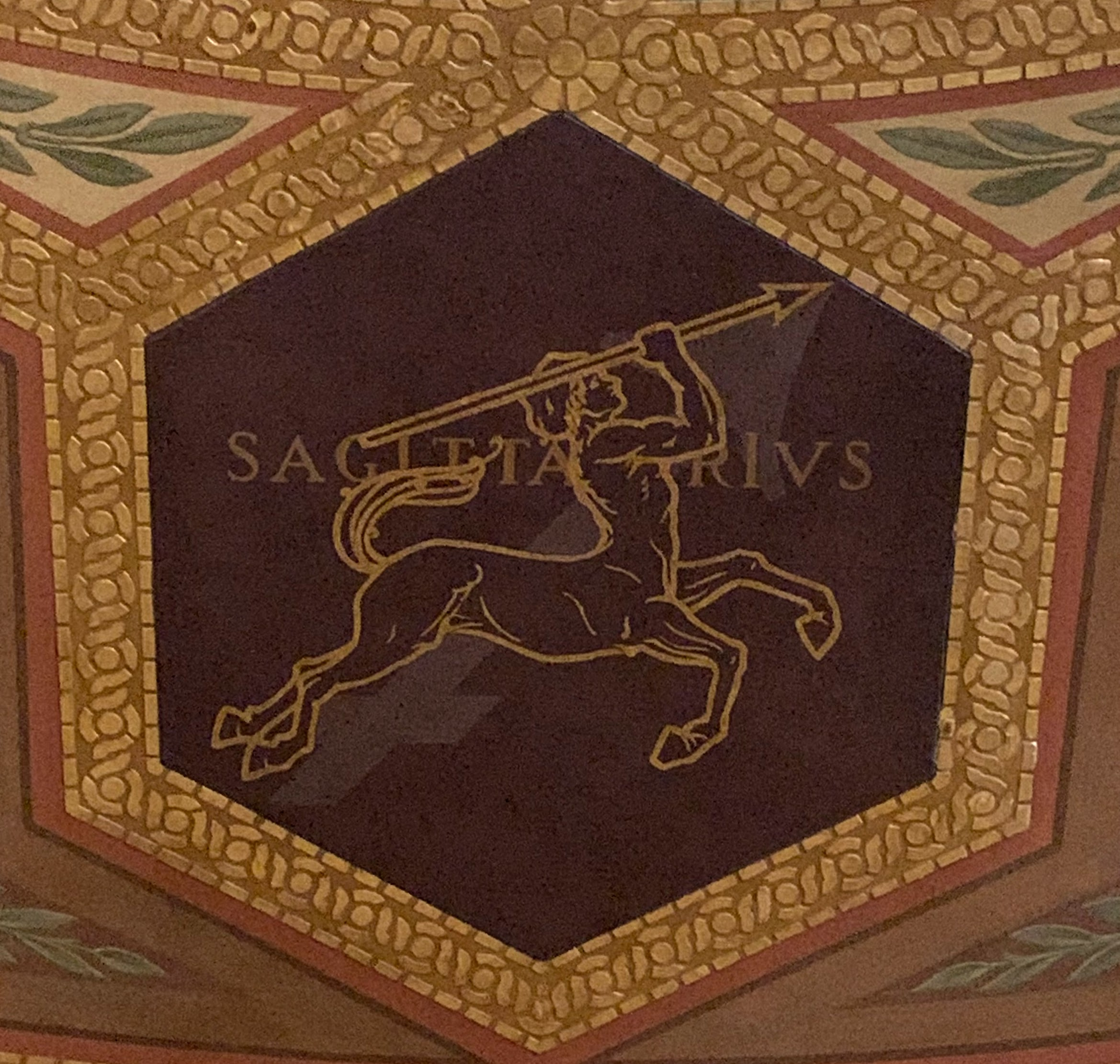
- Zodiac symbol: Archer
- Duration (tropical, western): November 22 – December 21 (2026, UT1)
- Constellation: Sagittarius
- Zodiac element: Fire
- Zodiac quality: Mutable
- Sign ruler: Jupiter
- Detriment: Mercury
- Exaltation: South Node, Eris
- Fall: Ceres, North Node

Sagittarius (♐︎; Ancient Greek: Τοξότης, romanized: Toxótēs, Latin for "archer") is the ninth astrological sign, which is associated with the constellation Sagittarius and spans 240–70th degrees of the zodiac. Under the tropical zodiac, the sun transits this sign between approximately November 23 and December 21.

== Astrology ==
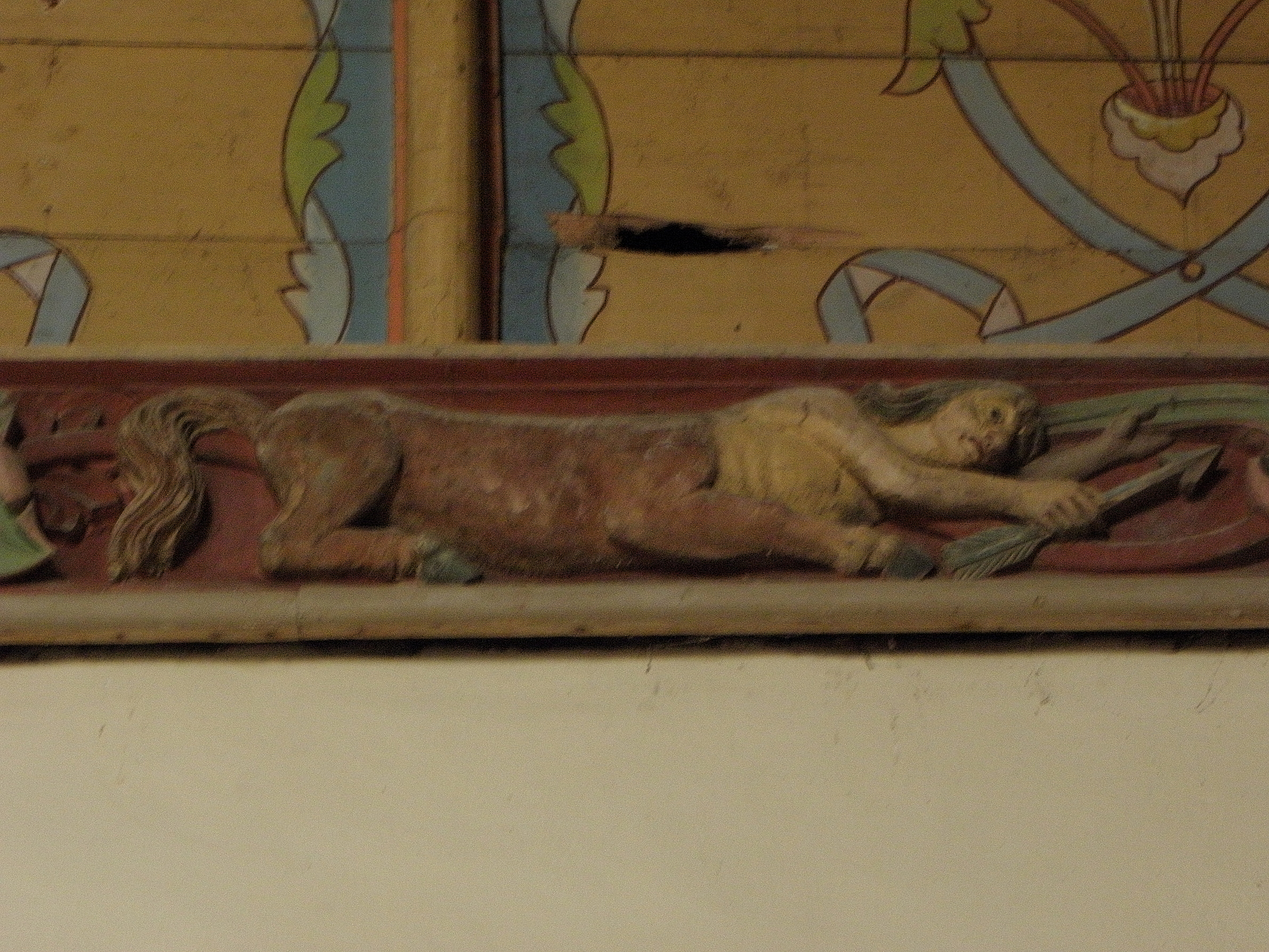
A medieval Sagittarius found in the Church of Notre-Dame, Sablières, France

Along with Aries and Leo, Sagittarius is a part of the Fire Trigon as well as the last of the reproductive trinity. It also follows Pisces, Gemini and Virgo as fourth of the mutable signs, which are the signs that feature changeable quality. When Sagittarius is depicted as an archer, then he is classified as human but when represented as a centaur, he is nonhuman (bestial). However, the classification of the astrological sign as a human or bestial does not carry practical consequences for interpretation.

As an archer, Sagittarius is said never to fail in hitting the mark and this depiction alludes to the power of prophecy, hence, the claim that seers and prophets are born in this sign.

== Gallery ==
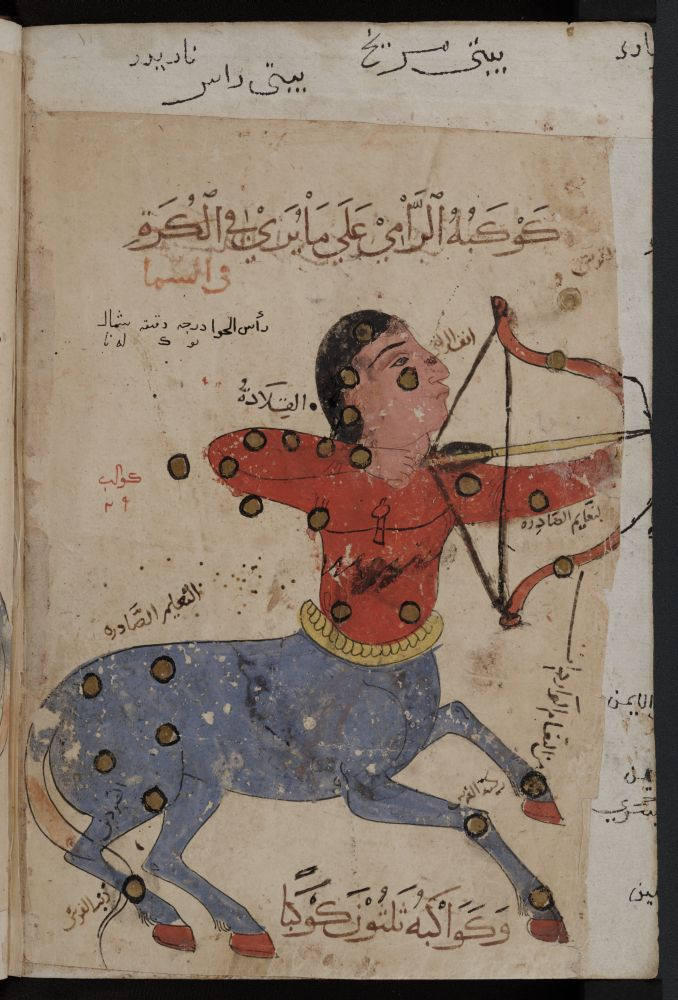
Sagittarius as depicted in the 14th-/15th-century Arabic astrology text Book of Wonders

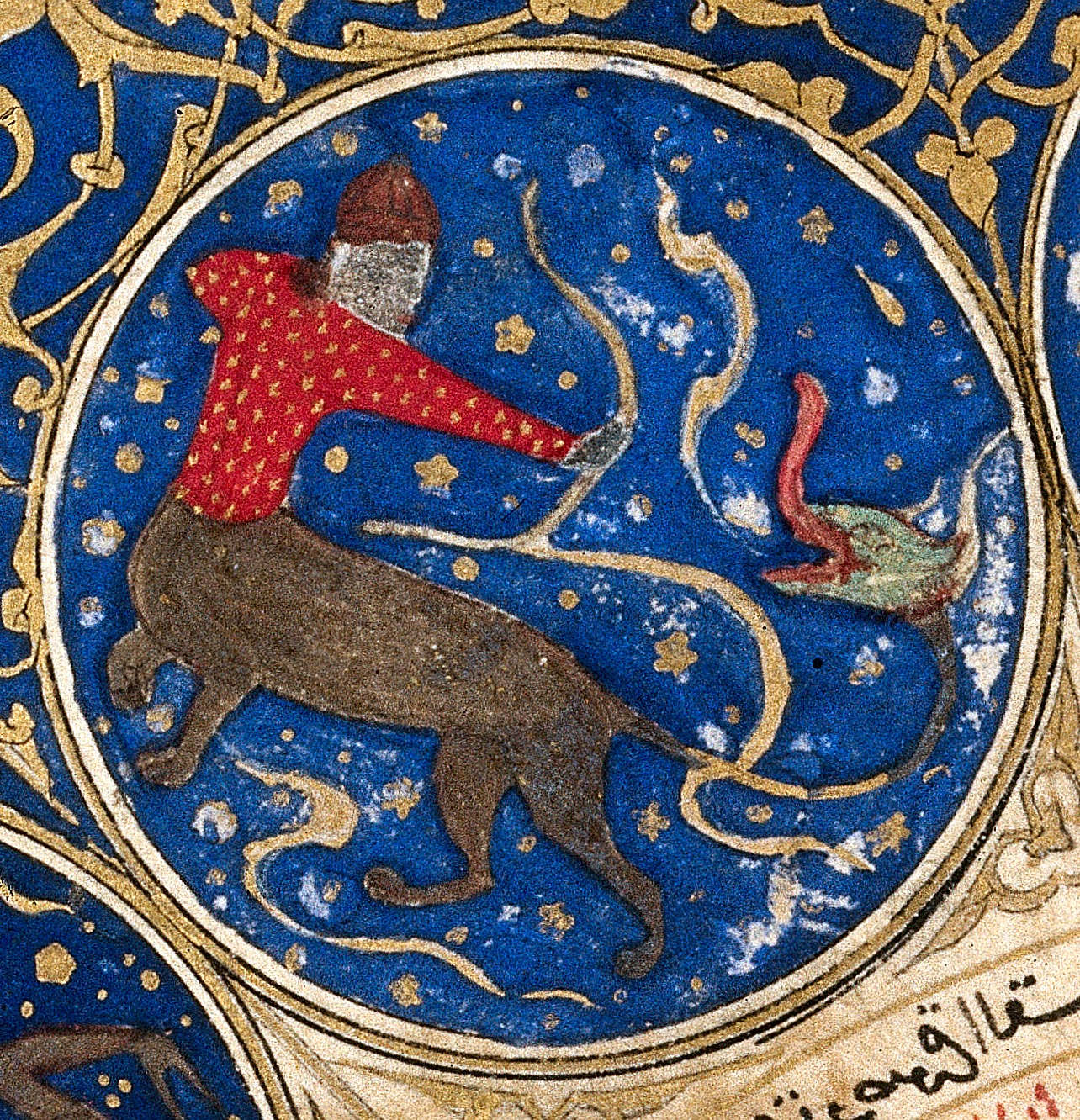
Sagittarius - The Centaur, detail from the Horoscope from 'The book of birth of Iskandar"

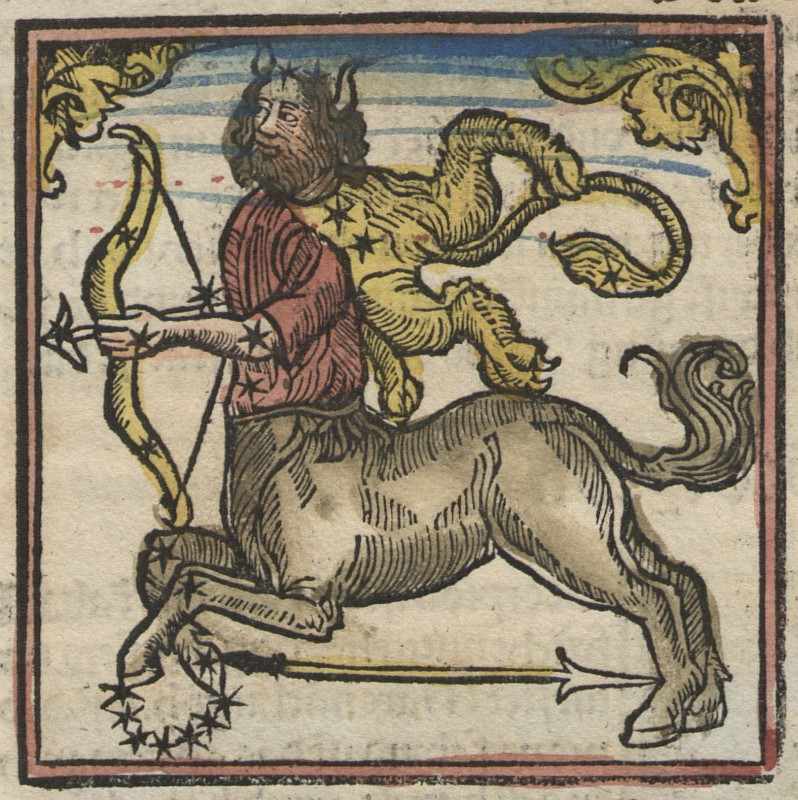
Sagittarius from a 1512 German woodcut

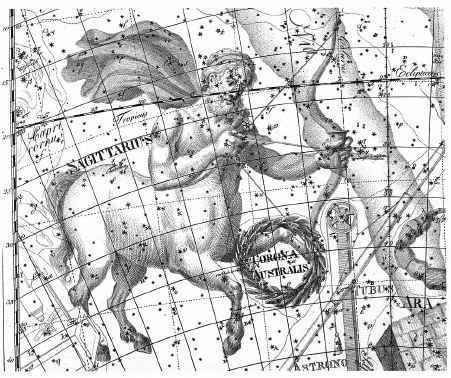
A symbolic representation of Sagittarius published in Uranographia by Johann Elert Bode. In tropical astrology, there is no correspondence between the constellation and the astrological signs.

== See also ==
- Astronomical symbols
- Chinese zodiac
- Circle of stars
- Cusp (astrology)
- Elements of the zodiac
- Fire (classical element)

== Works cited ==
- Anastasi, Sandy (2013). Astrology: Art and Science. Bloomington, IN: Balboa Press. ISBN 9781452583921.
- Astronomical Applications Department (2011). Multiyear Computer Interactive Almanac. 2.2.2. Washington DC: US Naval Observatory. Longitude of Sun, apparent geocentric ecliptic of date, interpolated to find time of crossing 0°, 30°....
- Leo, Alan (2006). Astrology for All. New York: Cosimo, Inc. ISBN 1596059249.
- Lewis, James (2003). The Astrology Book: The Encyclopedia of Heavenly Influences. Canton, MI: Visible Ink Press. ISBN 1578591449.
- "Sagittarius". Britannica. August 12, 2022.
- Tatum, Jeremy B. (June 2010). "The Signs and Constellations of the Zodiac". Journal of the Royal Society of Canada. 104 (3): 103–104. Bibcode:2010JRASC.104..103T.
