= Zodiac =

Area of the sky divided into twelve signs

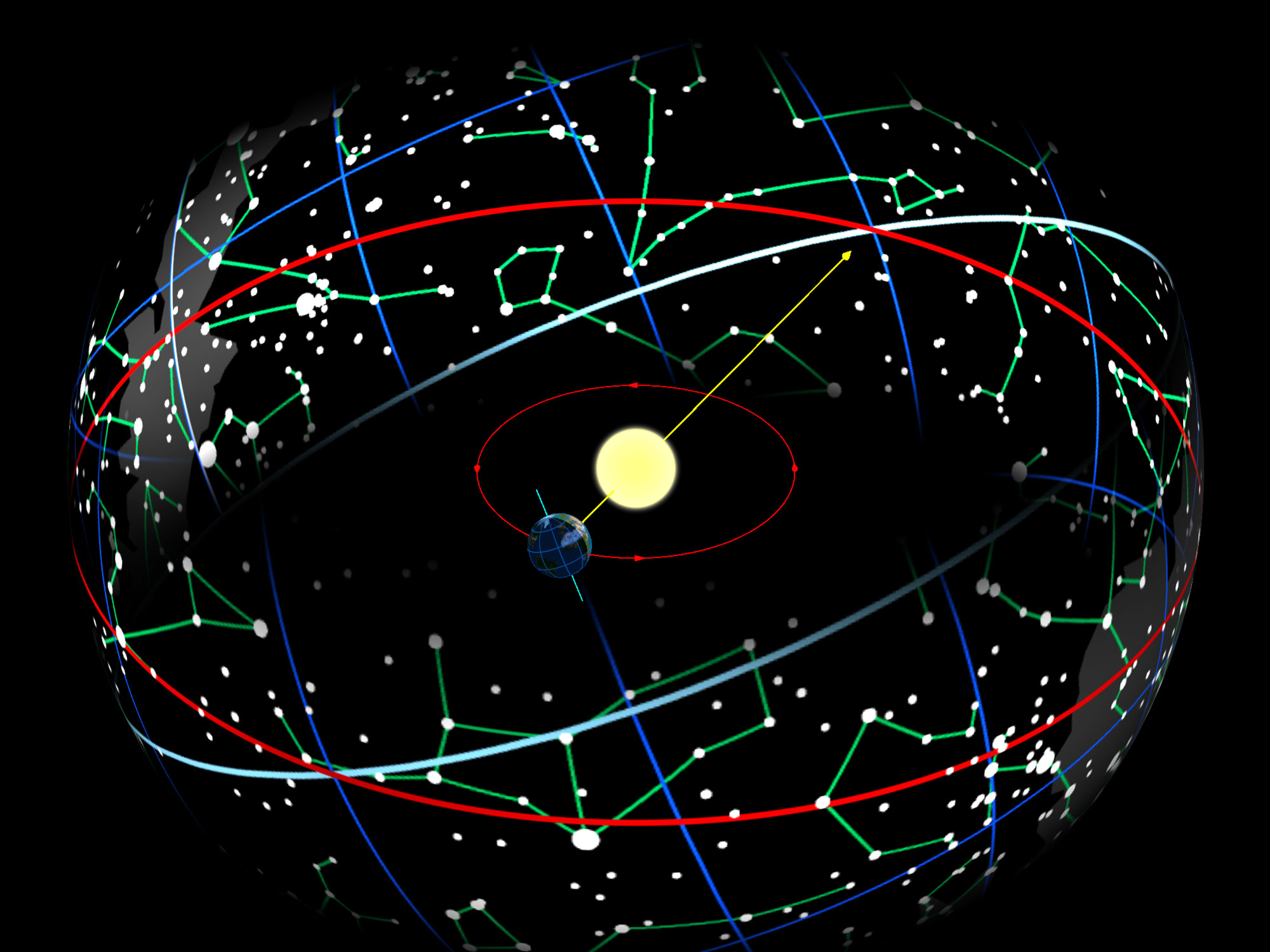
The Earth's orbit around the Sun causes the apparent motion of the latter along the ecliptic (red). Earth is axially tilted 23.4° relative to this plane; its equator, extended to the stars, is shown in light blue.

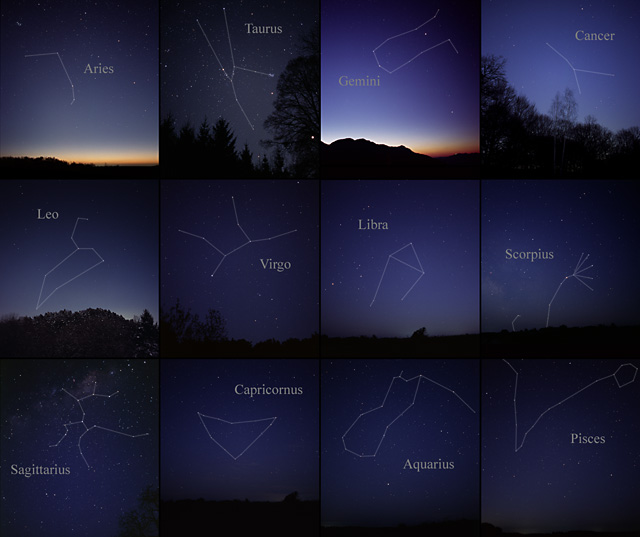
Astrophotos of the twelve zodiac constellations

The zodiac is a belt-shaped region of the sky that extends approximately 8° north and south celestial latitude of the ecliptic – the apparent path of the Sun across the celestial sphere over the course of the year. Within this zodiac belt appear the Moon and the brightest planets, along their orbital planes. The zodiac is divided along the ecliptic into 12 equal parts, called "signs", each occupying 30° of celestial longitude. These signs roughly correspond to the astronomical constellations with the following modern names: Aries, Taurus, Gemini, Cancer, Leo, Virgo, Libra, Scorpio, Sagittarius, Capricorn, Aquarius, and Pisces.

The signs have been used to determine the time of the year by identifying each sign with the days of the year the Sun is in the respective sign. In Western astrology, and formerly astronomy, the time of each sign is associated with different attributes. The zodiacal system and its angular measurement in 360 sexagesimal degree (°) originated with Babylonian astronomy during the 1st millennium BC, probably during the Achaemenid Empire. It was communicated into Greek astronomy by the 2nd century BC, as well as into developing the Hindu zodiac. Due to the precession of the equinoxes, the time of year that the Sun is in a given constellation has changed since Babylonian times, and the point of March equinox has moved from Aries into Pisces.

The zodiac forms a celestial coordinate system, or more specifically an ecliptic coordinate system, which takes the ecliptic as the origin of latitude and the Sun's position at vernal equinox as the origin of longitude. In modern astronomy, the ecliptic coordinate system is still used for tracking Solar System objects.

== Name ==
The English word zodiac derives from zōdiacus, the Latinized form of the Ancient Greek zōdiakòs (ζῳδιακός), meaning "of or relating to little animals", Zōdion (ζῴδιον) being the diminutive of zōon (ζῷον, "animal"). The name reflects the prominence of animals (and mythological hybrids) among the twelve signs. In English, the term "zodiac" may also be used in reference to or translation for the similar twelve year cycle (also sometimes applied to other time units than years) of the East Asian-derived systems referred to as the Chinese zodiac (see also, Earthly Branches): similarities include the use of animal or theriomorphic figures associated with a twelve year cycle used culturally to allege or describe personality traits, life events, and their interrelationships—thus this use in translation.

== Usage ==
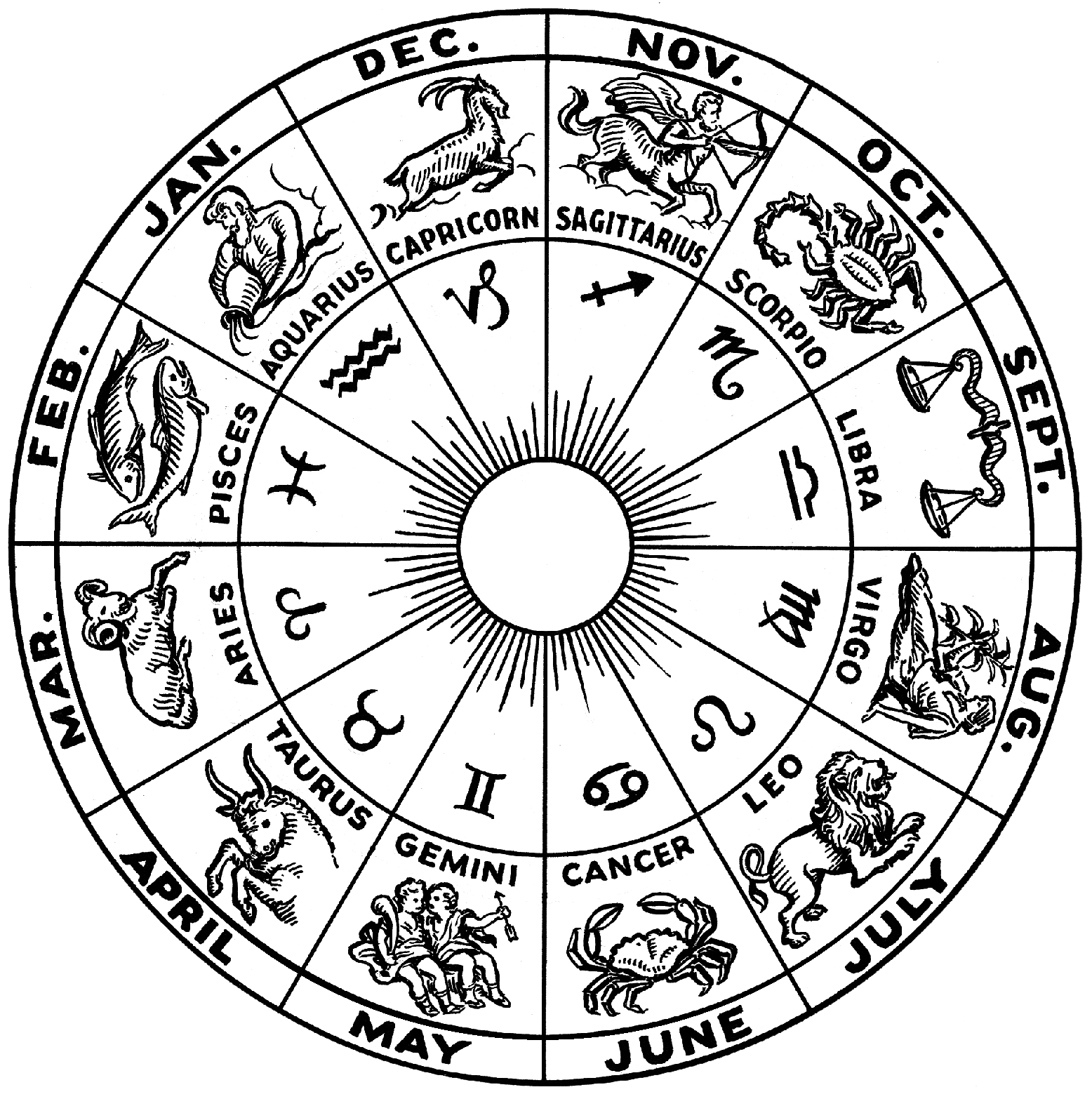
Modern zodiac wheel showing the 12 signs used in horoscopic astrology

The zodiac was in use by the Roman era, based on concepts inherited by Hellenistic astronomy from Babylonian astronomy of the Chaldean period (mid-1st millennium BC), which, in turn, derived from an earlier system of lists of stars along the ecliptic. The construction of the zodiac is described in Ptolemy's comprehensive 2nd century AD work, the Almagest.

Although the zodiac remains the basis of the ecliptic coordinate system in use in astronomy besides the equatorial one, the term and the names of the twelve signs are today mostly associated with horoscopic astrology. The term "zodiac" may also refer to the region of the celestial sphere encompassing the paths of the planets corresponding to the band of about 8 arc degrees above and below the ecliptic. The zodiac of a given planet is the band that contains the path of that particular body; e.g., the "zodiac of the Moon" is the band of 5° above and below the ecliptic. By extension, the "zodiac of the comets" may refer to the band encompassing most short-period comets.

== History ==
=== Early history ===
As early as the 14th century BC a complete list of the 36 Egyptian decans was placed among the hieroglyphs adorning the tomb of Seti I; they figured again in the temple of Ramesses II, and characterize every Egyptian astrological monument. Both the famous zodiacs of Dendera, dated 50 BC, display their symbols, identified by Karl Richard Lepsius.

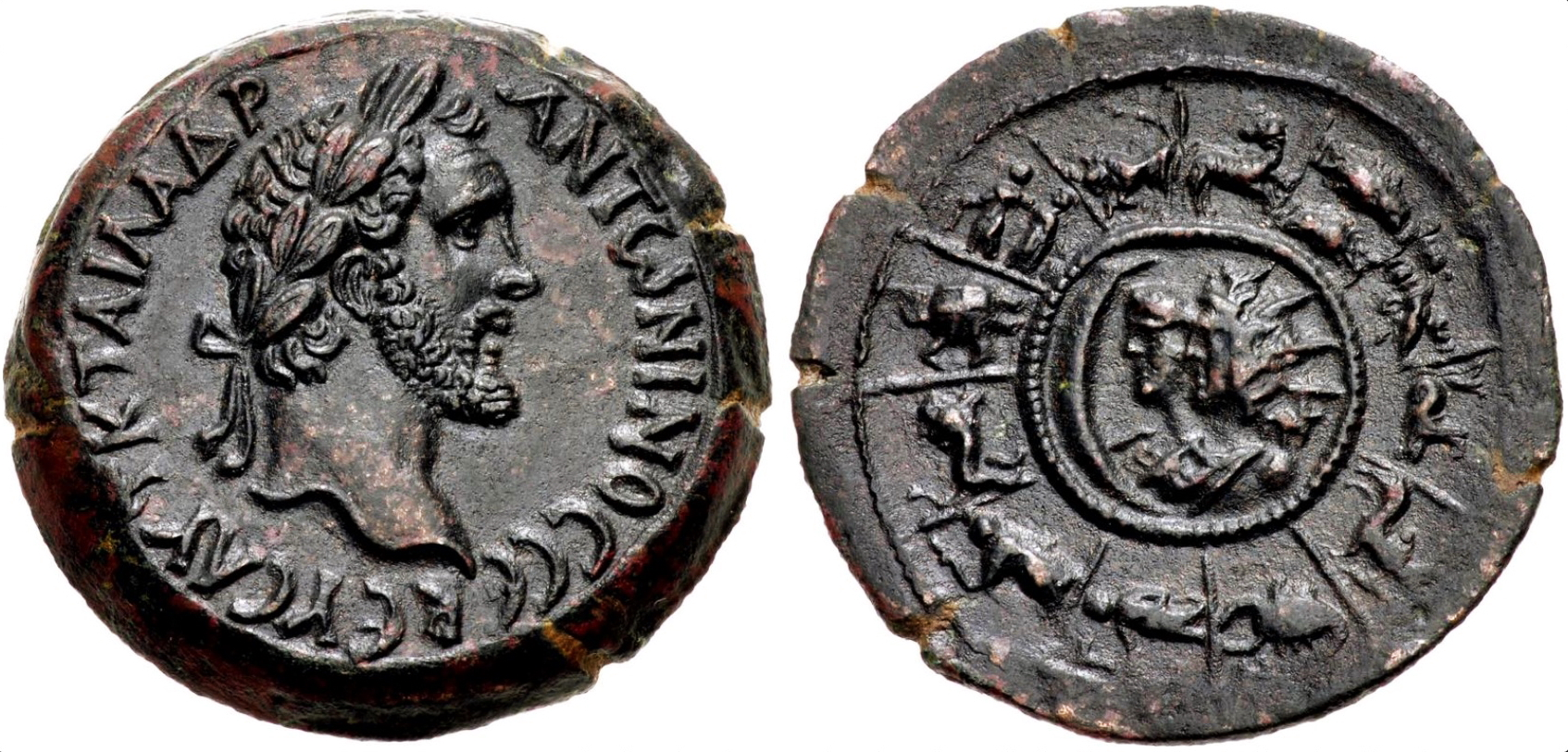
Roman Egyptian coin of Antoninus Pius (dated year 8 of his reign or 145 AD) showing his portrait and a Zodiac wheel with the busts of Helios and Selene in the center

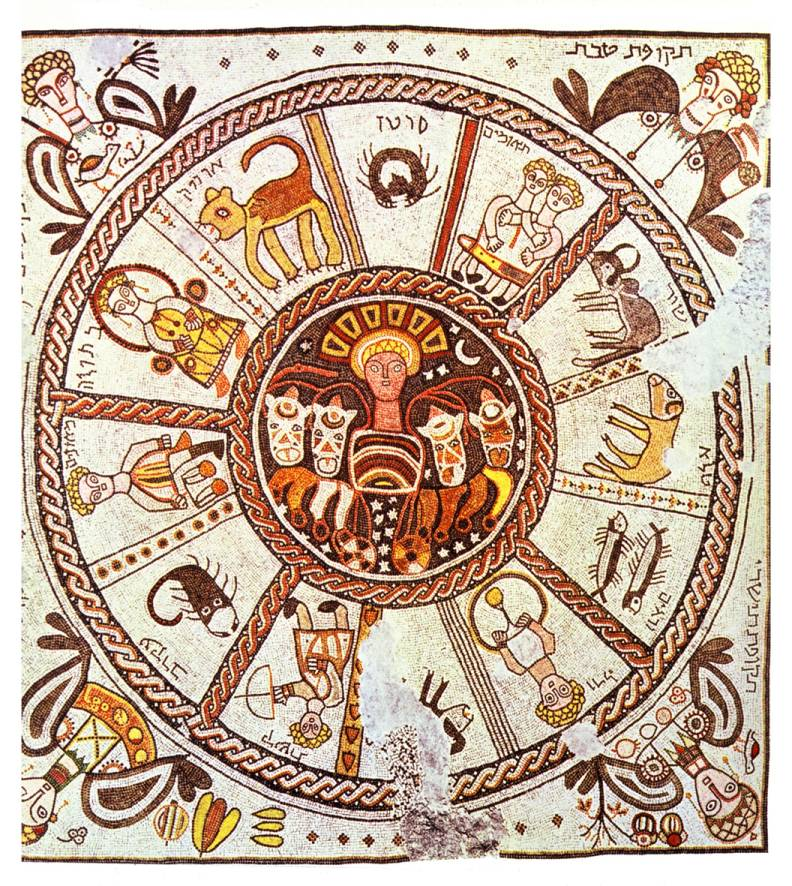
A sixth-century mosaic zodiac wheel in synagogue Beth Alpha incorporating Greek-Byzantine elements, Israel

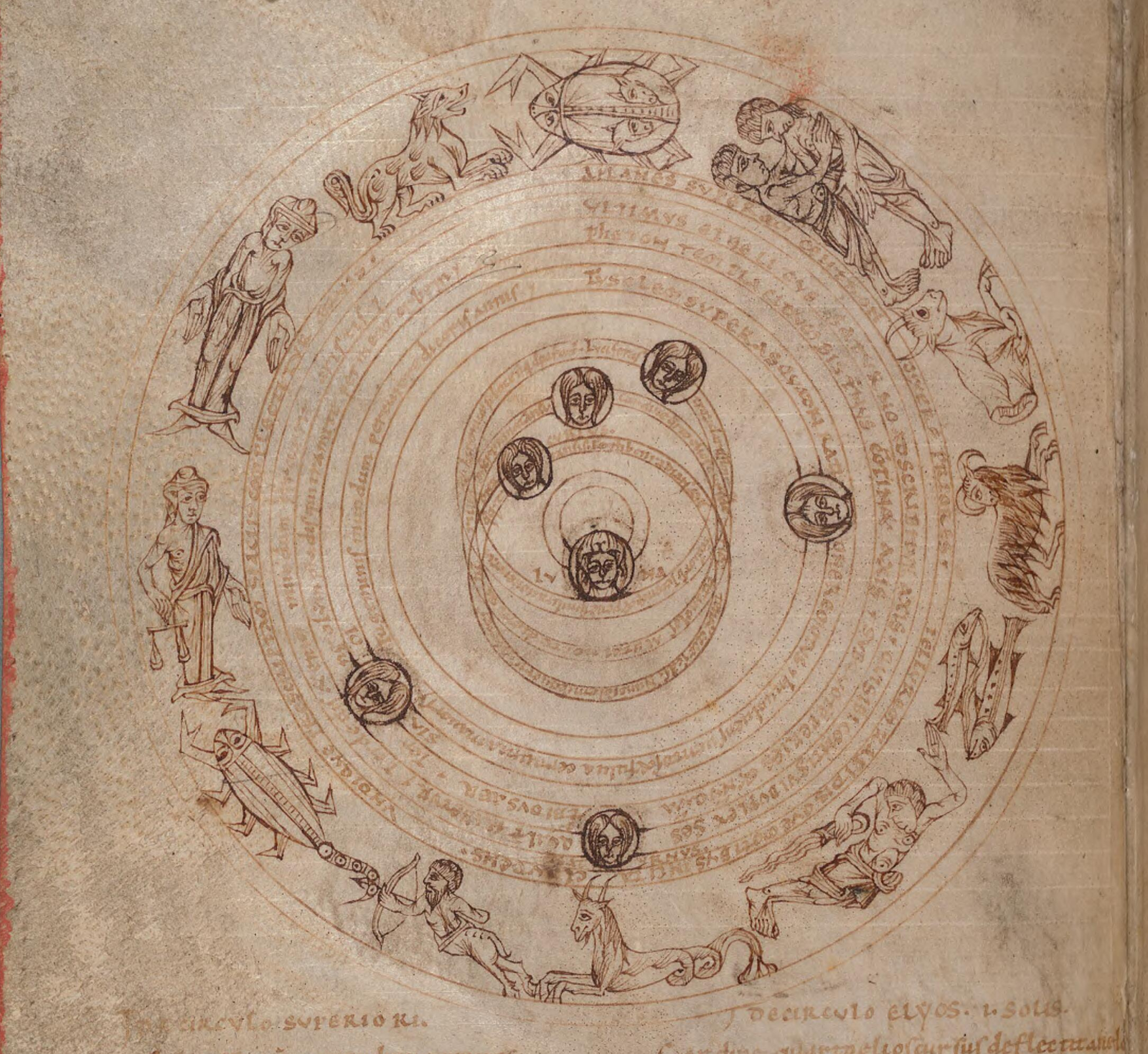
Zodiac circle with planets, c. 1000 – NLW MS 735C

The division of the ecliptic into the zodiacal signs originates in Babylonian astronomy during the first half of the 1st millennium BC. The zodiac draws on stars in earlier Babylonian star catalogues, such as the MUL.APIN catalogue, which was compiled around 1000 BC. Some constellations can be traced even further back, to Bronze Age (Old Babylonian Empire) sources, including Gemini "The Twins", from Sumerian: 𒀯𒈦𒋰𒁀𒃲𒃲, romanized: ^{MUL}MAŠ.TAB.BA.GAL.GAL "The Great Twins"; Cancer "The Crab", from Sumerian: 𒀯𒀠𒇻, romanized: ^{MUL}AL.LUL "The Crayfish", among others.

Around the end of the fifth century BC, Babylonian astronomers divided the ecliptic into 12 equal "signs", by analogy to 12 schematic months of 30 days each. Each sign contained 30° of celestial longitude, thus creating the first known celestial coordinate system. According to calculations by modern astrophysics, the zodiac was introduced between 409 and 398 BC, during Persian rule, and probably within a very few years of 401 BC. Unlike modern astrologers, who place the beginning of the sign of Aries at the position of the Sun at the vernal equinox in the Northern Hemisphere (March equinox), Babylonian astronomers fixed the zodiac in relation to stars, placing the beginning of Cancer at the "Rear Twin Star" (β Geminorum) and the beginning of Aquarius at the "Rear Star of the Goat-Fish" (δ Capricorni).

Due to the precession of the equinoxes, the time of year the Sun is in a given constellation has changed since Babylonian times, as the point of March equinox has moved from Aries into Pisces.

Because the divisions were made into equal arcs of 30° each, they constituted an ideal system of reference for making predictions about a planet's longitude. However, Babylonian techniques of observational measurements were in a rudimentary stage of evolution. They measured the position of a planet in reference to a set of "normal stars" close to the ecliptic (±9° of latitude). The normal stars were used as observational reference points to help position a planet within this ecliptic coordinate system.

In Babylonian astronomical diaries, a planet position was generally given with respect to a zodiacal sign alone, though less often in specific degrees within a sign. When the degrees of longitude were given, they were expressed with reference to the 30° of the zodiacal sign, i.e., not with a reference to the continuous 360° ecliptic. In astronomical ephemerides, the positions of significant astronomical phenomena were computed in sexagesimal fractions of a degree (equivalent to minutes and seconds of arc). For daily ephemerides, the daily positions of a planet were not as important as the astrologically significant dates when the planet crossed from one zodiacal sign to the next.

=== Hebrew astronomy and astrology ===
Knowledge of the Babylonian zodiac is said to be reflected in the Hebrew Bible; E. W. Bullinger interpreted the creatures that appear in the book of Ezekiel (1:10) as the middle signs of the four quarters of the zodiac, with the Lion as Leo, the Bull as Taurus, the Man as Aquarius and the Eagle as a higher aspect of Scorpio. Some authors have linked the signs of the zodiac with the twelve tribes of Israel, and with the lunar Hebrew calendar, which has twelve lunar months in a lunar year. Ernest L. Martin and others have argued that the arrangement of the tribes around the Tabernacle (reported in the Book of Numbers) corresponded to the order of the zodiac, with Judah, Reuben, Ephraim, and Dan representing the middle signs of Leo, Aquarius, Taurus, and Scorpio, respectively. Such connections were taken up by Thomas Mann, who in his novel Joseph and His Brothers, attributes characteristics of a sign of the zodiac to each tribe, in his rendition of the Blessing of Jacob.

=== Hellenistic and Roman era ===
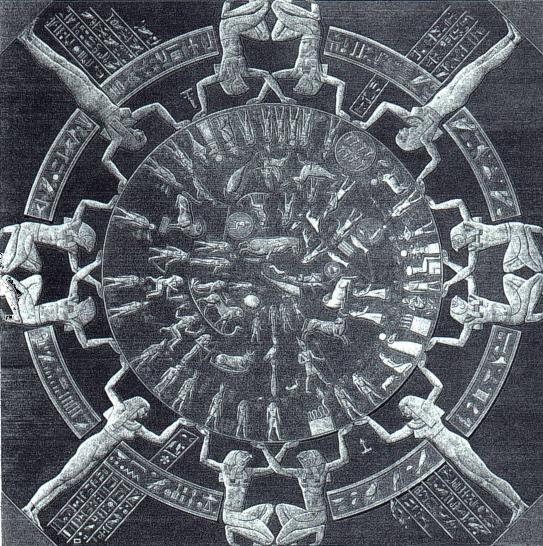
The 1st century BC Dendera zodiac (19th-century engraving)

The Babylonian star catalogs entered Greek astronomy in the 4th century BC, via Eudoxus of Cnidus. Babylonia or Chaldea in the Hellenistic world came to be so identified with astrology that "Chaldean wisdom" became among Greeks and Romans the synonym of divination through the planets and stars. Hellenistic astrology derived in part from Babylonian and Egyptian astrology. Horoscopic astrology first appeared in Ptolemaic Egypt (305 BC–30 BC). The Dendera zodiac, a relief dating to c. 50 BC, is the first known depiction of the classical zodiac of twelve signs.

The earliest extant Greek text using the Babylonian division of the zodiac into 12 signs of 30 equal degrees each is the Anaphoricus of Hypsicles of Alexandria (fl. 190 BC). Particularly important in the development of Western horoscopic astrology was the astrologer and astronomer Ptolemy, whose work Tetrabiblos laid the basis of the Western astrological tradition. Under the Greeks, and Ptolemy in particular, the planets, Houses, and signs of the zodiac were rationalized and their function set down in a way that has changed little to the present day. Ptolemy lived in the 2nd century AD, three centuries after the discovery of the precession of the equinoxes by Hipparchus around 130 BC. Hipparchus's lost work on precession never circulated very widely until it was brought to prominence by Ptolemy, and there are few explanations of precession outside the work of Ptolemy until late Antiquity, by which time Ptolemy's influence was widely established. Ptolemy clearly explained the theoretical basis of the western zodiac as being a tropical coordinate system, by which the zodiac is aligned to the equinoxes and solstices, rather than the visible constellations that bear the same names as the zodiac signs.

=== Hindu zodiac ===
According to mathematician-historian Montucla, the Hindu zodiac was adopted from the Greek zodiac through communications between ancient India and the Greek empire of Bactria. The Hindu zodiac uses the sidereal coordinate system, which makes reference to the fixed stars. The tropical zodiac (of Mesopotamian origin) is divided by the intersections of the ecliptic and equator, which shifts in relation to the backdrop of fixed stars at a rate of 1° every 72 years, creating the phenomenon known as precession of the equinoxes. The Hindu zodiac, being sidereal, does not maintain this seasonal alignment, but there are still similarities between the two systems. The Hindu zodiac signs and corresponding Greek signs sound very different, being in Sanskrit and Greek respectively, but their symbols are nearly identical. For example, dhanu means "bow" and corresponds to Sagittarius, the "archer", and kumbha means "water-pitcher" and corresponds to Aquarius, the "water-carrier".

=== Middle Ages ===
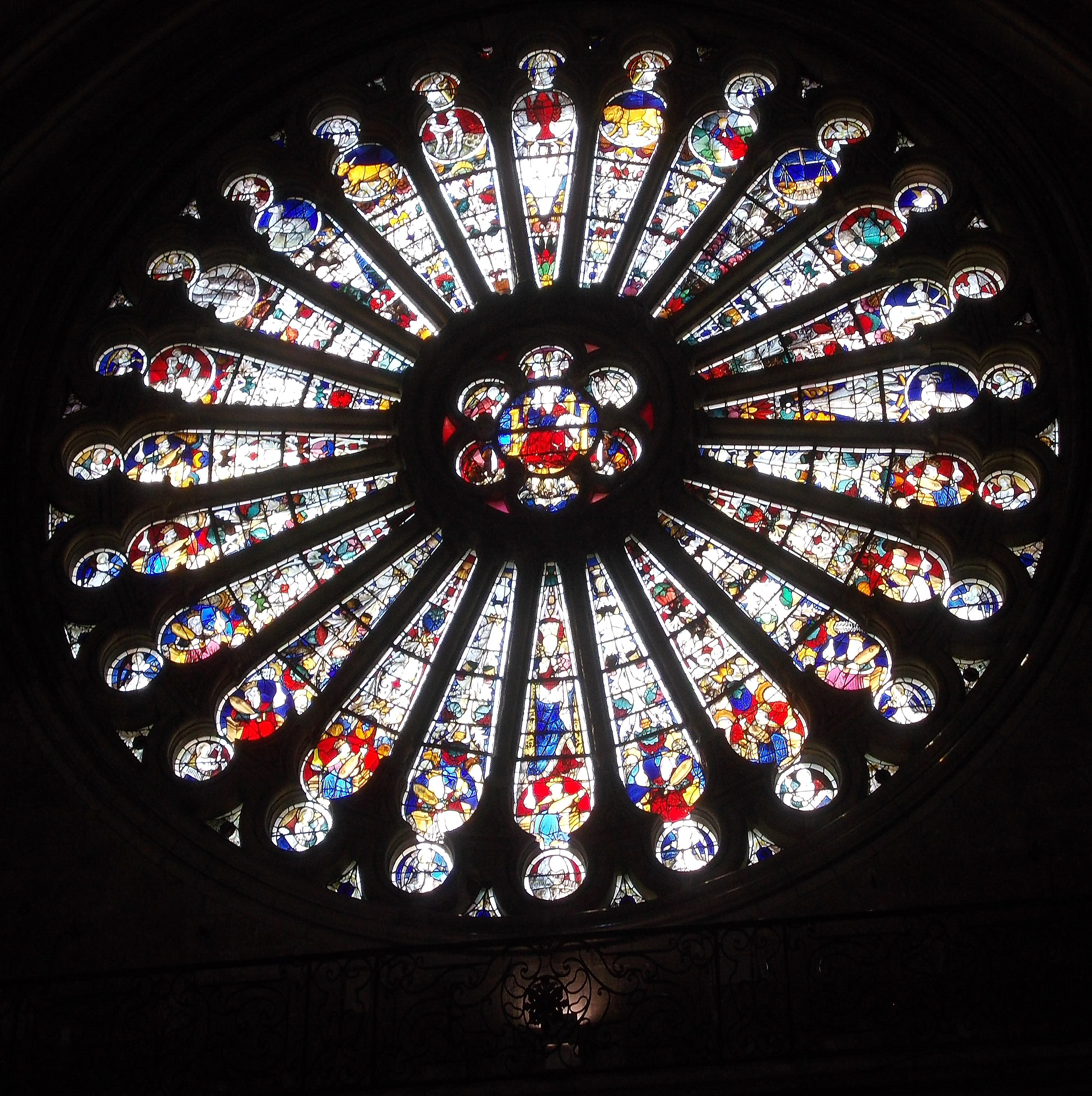
Angers Cathedral South Rose Window of Christ (center) with elders (bottom half) and zodiac (top half). Medieval stained glass by Andre Robin after the fire of 1451

During the Abbasid era, Greek reference books were translated into Arabic, and Islamic astronomers then did their own observations, correcting Ptolemy's Almagest. One such book was Al-Sufi's Book of Fixed Stars, which has pictorial depictions of 48 constellations. The book was divided into three sections: constellations of the zodiac, constellations north of the zodiac, and southern constellations. When Al-Sufi's book, and other works, were translated in the 11th century, there were mistakes made in the translations. As a result, some stars ended up with the names of the constellation they belong to (e.g. Hamal in Aries).

The High Middle Ages saw a revival of interest in Greco-Roman magic, first in Kabbalism and later continued in Renaissance magic. This included magical uses of the zodiac, as found, e.g., in the Sefer Raziel HaMalakh.

The zodiac is found in medieval stained glass as at Angers Cathedral, where the master glass maker, André Robin, made the ornate rosettes for the North and South transepts after the fire there in 1451.

=== Medieval Islamic era ===
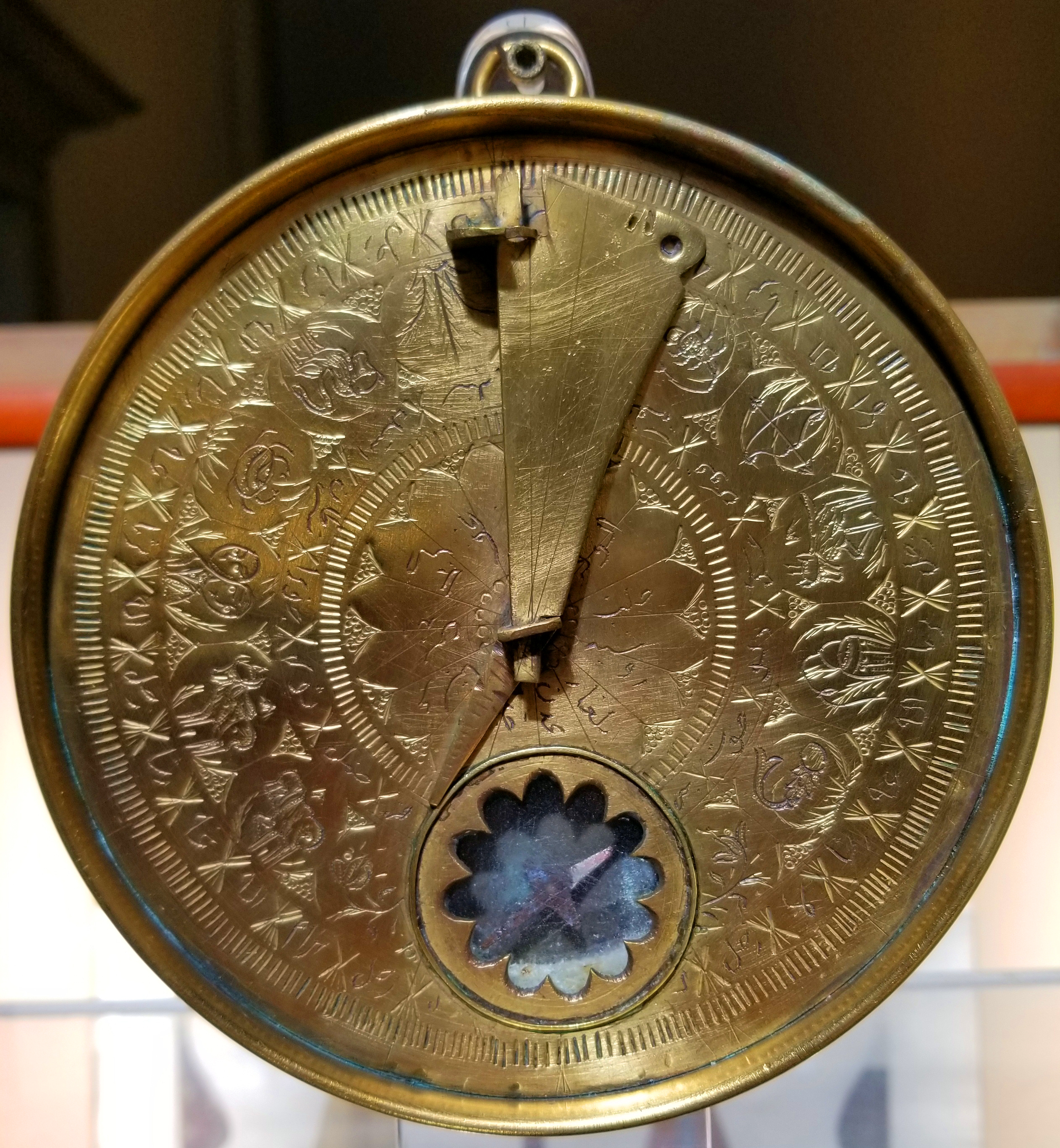
Ottoman-style sundial with folded gnomon and compass. The sundial features engraved toponyms in Arabic and zodiac symbols. Debbane Palace museum, Lebanon

Astrology emerged in the 8th century AD as a distinct discipline in Islam, with a mix of Indian, Hellenistic Iranian and other traditions blended with Greek and Islamic astronomical knowledge, for example Ptolemy's work and Al-Sufi's Book of Fixed Stars. A knowledge of the influence that the stars have on events on the earth was important in Islamic civilization. As a rule, it was believed that the signs of the zodiac and the planets control the destiny not only of people but also of nations, and that the zodiac has the ability to determine a person's physical characteristics as well as intelligence and personal traits.

The practice of astrology at this time could be divided into four broader categories: Genethlialogy, Catarchic Astrology, Interrogational Astrology and General Astrology. However the most common type of astrology was Genethlialogy, which examined all aspects of a person's life in relation to the planetary positions at their birth; more commonly known as our horoscope.

Astrology services were offered widely across the empire, mainly in bazaars, where people could pay for a reading. Astrology was valued in the royal courts, for example, the Abbasid Caliph Al-Mansur used astrology to determine the best date for founding the new capital of Baghdad. While horoscopes were generally widely accepted by society, many scholars condemned the use of astrology and divination, linking it to occult influences. Many theologians and scholars thought that it went against the tenets of Islam; as only God should be able to determine events rather than astrologers looking at the positions of the planets.

In order to calculate someone's horoscope, an astrologer would use three tools: an astrolabe, ephemeris and a takht. First, the astrologer would use an astrolabe to find the position of the sun, align the rule with the persons time of birth and then align the rete to establish the altitude of the sun on that date. Next, the astrologer would use an ephemeris, a table denoting the mean position of the planets and stars within the sky at any given time. Finally, the astrologer would add the altitude of the sun taken from the astrolabe, with the mean position of the planets on the person's birthday, and add them together on the takht (also known as the dustboard). The dust board was merely a tablet covered in sand; on which the calculations could be made and erased easily. Once this had been calculated, the astrologer was then able to interpret the horoscope. Most of these interpretations were based on the zodiac in literature. For example, there were several manuals on how to interpret each zodiac sign, the treatise relating to each individual sign and what the characteristics of these zodiacs were.

=== Early modern ===
An example of the use of signs as astronomical coordinates may be found in the Nautical Almanac and Astronomical Ephemeris for the year 1767. The "Longitude of the Sun" columns show the sign (represented as a digit from 0 to and including 11), degrees from 0 to 29, minutes, and seconds.

Mughal king Jahangir issued an attractive series of coins in gold and silver depicting the twelve signs of the zodiac.

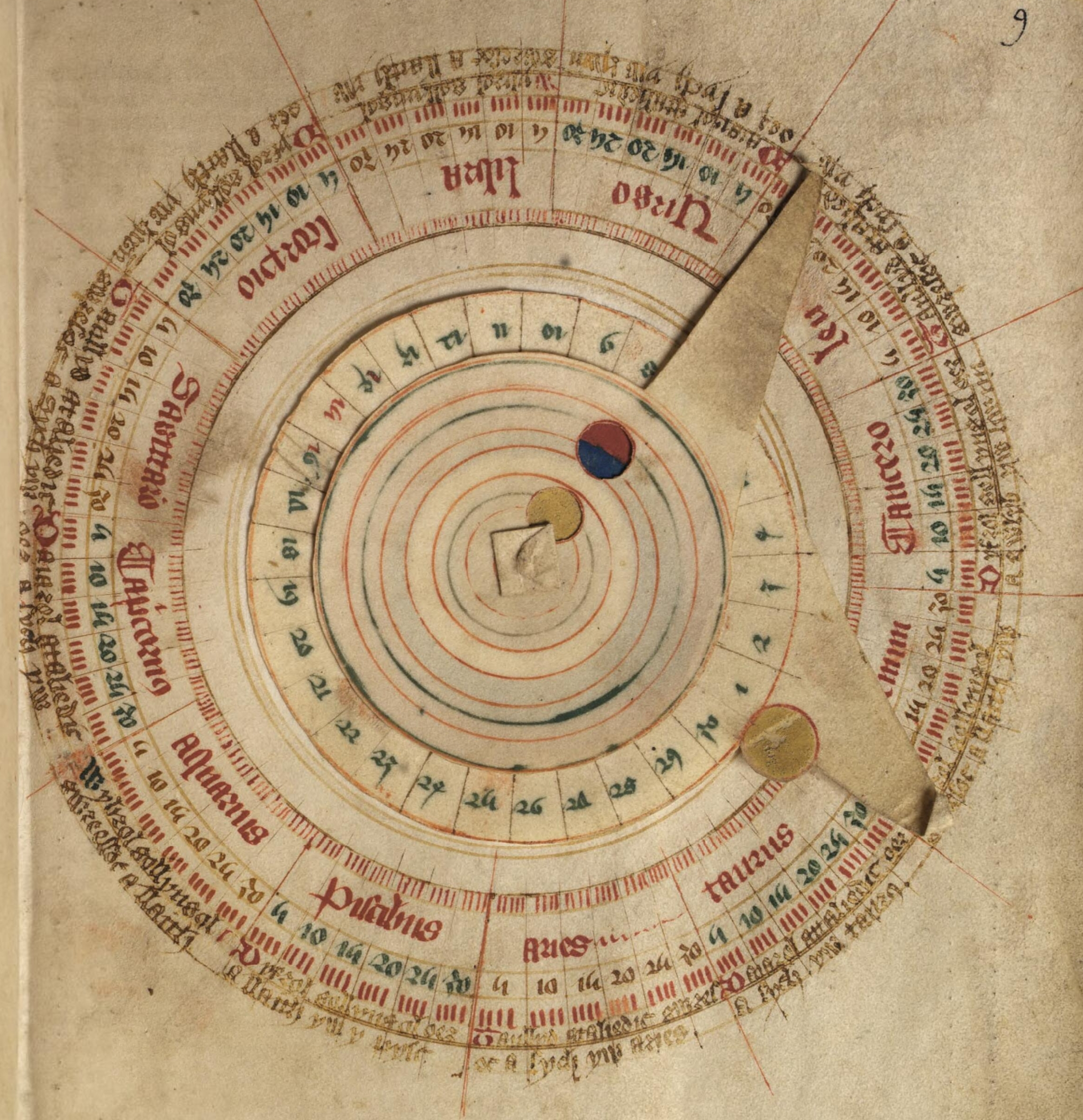
A volvella of the moon. A volvella is a moveable device for working out the position of the Sun and Moon in the zodiac, 15th century

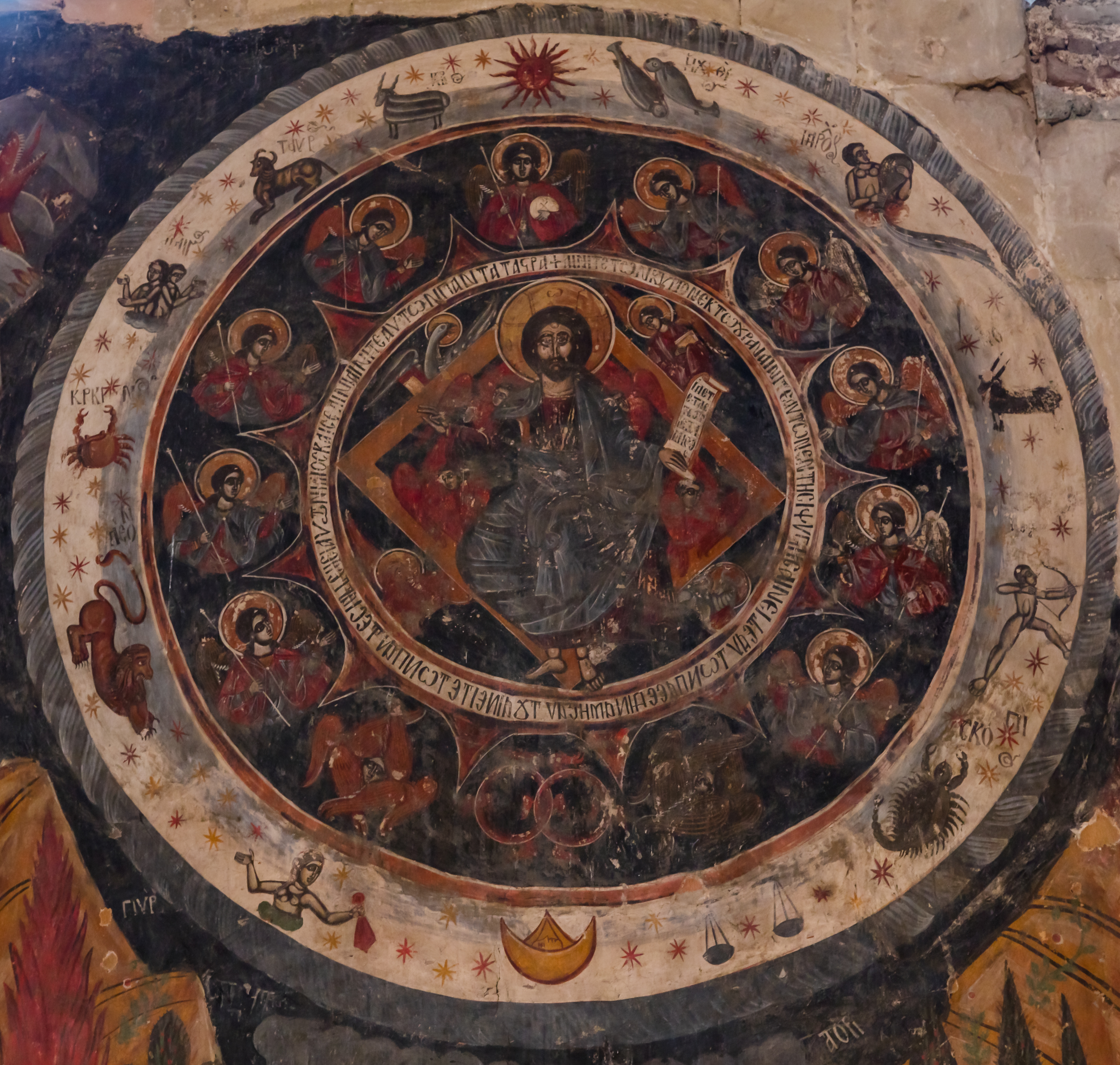
17th-century fresco of Christ in the zodiac circle, Cathedral of Living Pillar, Georgia

== Twelve signs ==
What follows is a list of the signs of the modern zodiac (with the ecliptic longitudes of their first points), where 0° Aries is understood as the vernal equinox, with their Latin, Greek, Sanskrit, and Babylonian names. But the Sanskrit and the name equivalents (after c.500 BC) denote the constellations only, not the tropical zodiac signs. The "English translation" is not usually used by English speakers. The Latin names are standard English usage (except that "Capricorn" is used rather than "Capricornus").

House	Unicode Character	Ecliptic Longitude (a ≤ λ < b)	Latin name	Gloss	Greek name (Romanization of Greek)	Sanskrit name	Sumero-Babylonian name
1	♈︎︎	0°	Aries	Ram	Κριός (Krios)	Meṣa (मेष)	^{MUL} LU.ḪUN.GA "Agrarian Worker", Dumuzi
2	♉︎︎	30°	Taurus	Bull	Ταῦρος (Tauros)	Vṛṣabha (वृषभ)	^{MUL}GU_{4}.AN.NA "Divine Bull of Heaven"
3	♊︎︎	60°	Gemini	Twins	Δίδυμοι (Didymoi)	Mithuna (मिथुन)	^{MUL}MAŠ.TAB.BA.GAL.GAL "Great Twins"
4	♋︎︎	90°	Cancer	Crab	Καρκίνος (Karkinos)	Karka (कर्क)	^{MUL}AL.LUL "Crayfish"
5	♌︎︎	120°	Leo	Lion	Λέων (Leōn)	Siṃha (सिंह)	^{MUL}UR.GU.LA "Lion"
6	♍︎︎	150°	Virgo	Maiden	Παρθένος (Parthenos)	Kanyā (कन्या)	^{MUL}AB.SIN "The Furrow"* *"The goddess Shala's ear of grain"
7	♎︎︎	180°	Libra	Scales	Ζυγός (Zygos)	Tulā (तुला)	^{MUL}ZIB.BA.AN.NA "Scales"
8	♏︎︎	210°	Scorpio	Scorpion	Σκoρπίος (Skorpios)	Vṛścika (वृश्चिक)	^{MUL}GIR.TAB "Scorpion"
9	♐︎︎	240°	Sagittarius	(Centaur) Archer	Τοξότης (Toxotēs)	Dhanuṣa (धनुष)	^{MUL}PA.BIL.SAG, Nedu "soldier"
10	♑︎︎	270°	Capricorn	Mountain Goat or Goat-Horned / Sea-Goat	Αἰγόκερως (Aigokerōs)	Makara (मकर)	^{MUL}SUḪUR.MAŠ "Goat-Fish" of Enki
11	♒︎︎	300°	Aquarius	Water-Bearer	Ὑδροχόος (Hydrokhoos)	Kumbha (कुंभ)	^{MUL}GU.LA "Great One" (i.e. Enki), later qâ "pitcher"
12	♓︎︎	330°	Pisces	2 Fish	Ἰχθύες (Ikhthyes)	Mīna (मीन)	^{MUL}SIM.MAḪ "Tail of the Swallow"; DU.NU.NU "fish-cord"

These twelve signs have been arranged into a nursery rhyme as a mnemonic device:

The ram, the bull, the heavenly twins,
And next the crab, the lion shines,
The virgin and the scales,
The scorpion, archer, and the goat,
The man who holds the watering-pot,
And fish with glittering scales.

— Isaac Watts

Another mnemonic is A Tense Gray Cat Lay Very Low, Sneaking Slowly, Contemplating A Pounce.

The following table compares the Gregorian dates on which the Sun enters a sign in the Ptolemaic tropical zodiac, and a sign in two sidereal systems: one proposed by Cyril Fagan, and a fourteen-sign system proposed by Steven Schmidt which adds Ophiuchus (see below) and Cetus (the IAU boundaries of which just graze by the ecliptic):

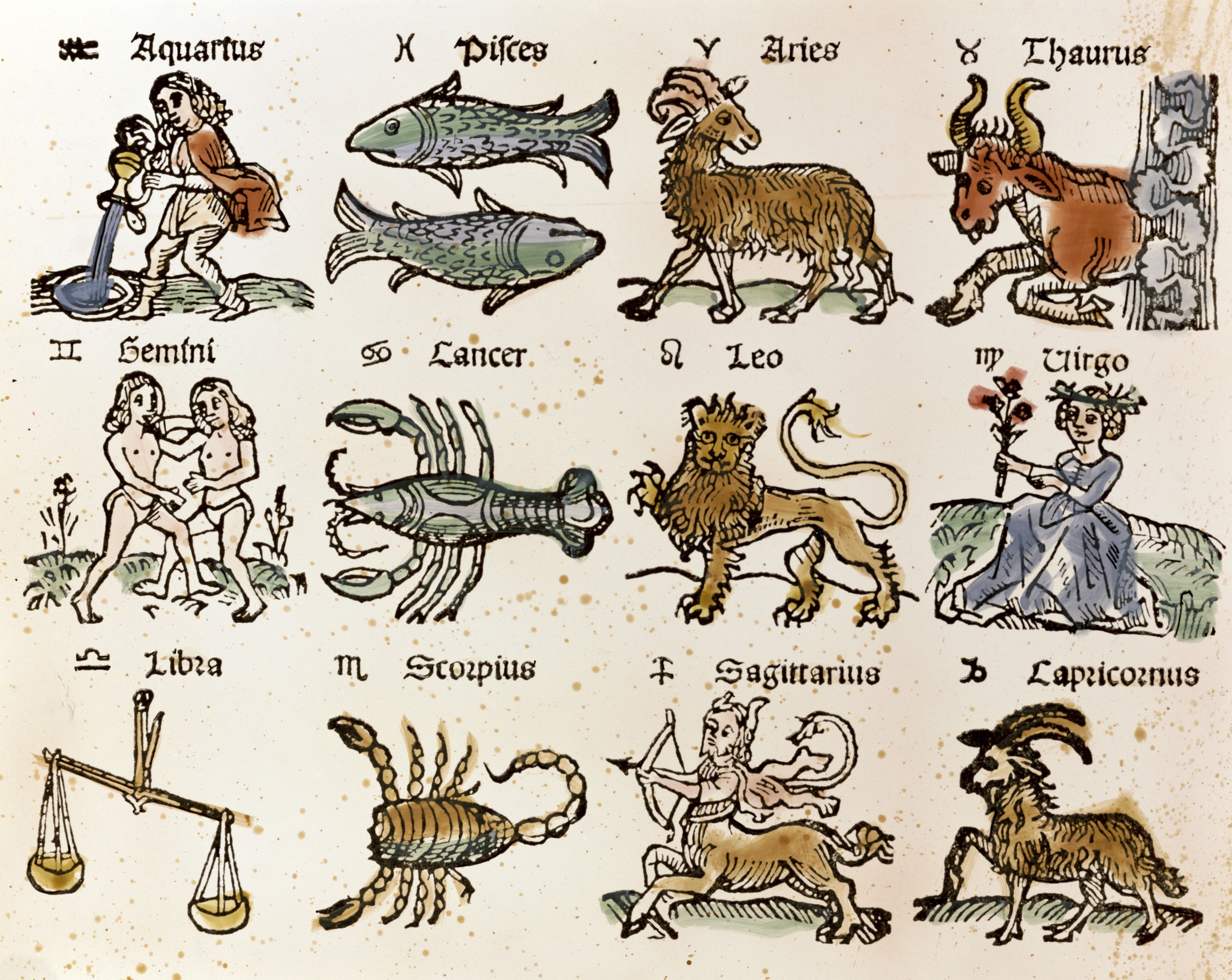
The zodiac signs in a 16th-century woodcut

The beginning of Aries is defined as the moment of vernal equinox, and all other dates shift accordingly. The precise Gregorian times and dates vary slightly from year to year as the Gregorian calendar shifts relative to the tropical year. These variations remain within less than two days' difference in the recent past and the near-future, vernal equinox in UT always falling either on 20 or 21 March in the period of 1797 to 2043, falling on 19 March in 1796 the last time and in 2044 the next. The vernal equinox has fallen on 20 March UT since 2008, and will continue to do so until 2043.

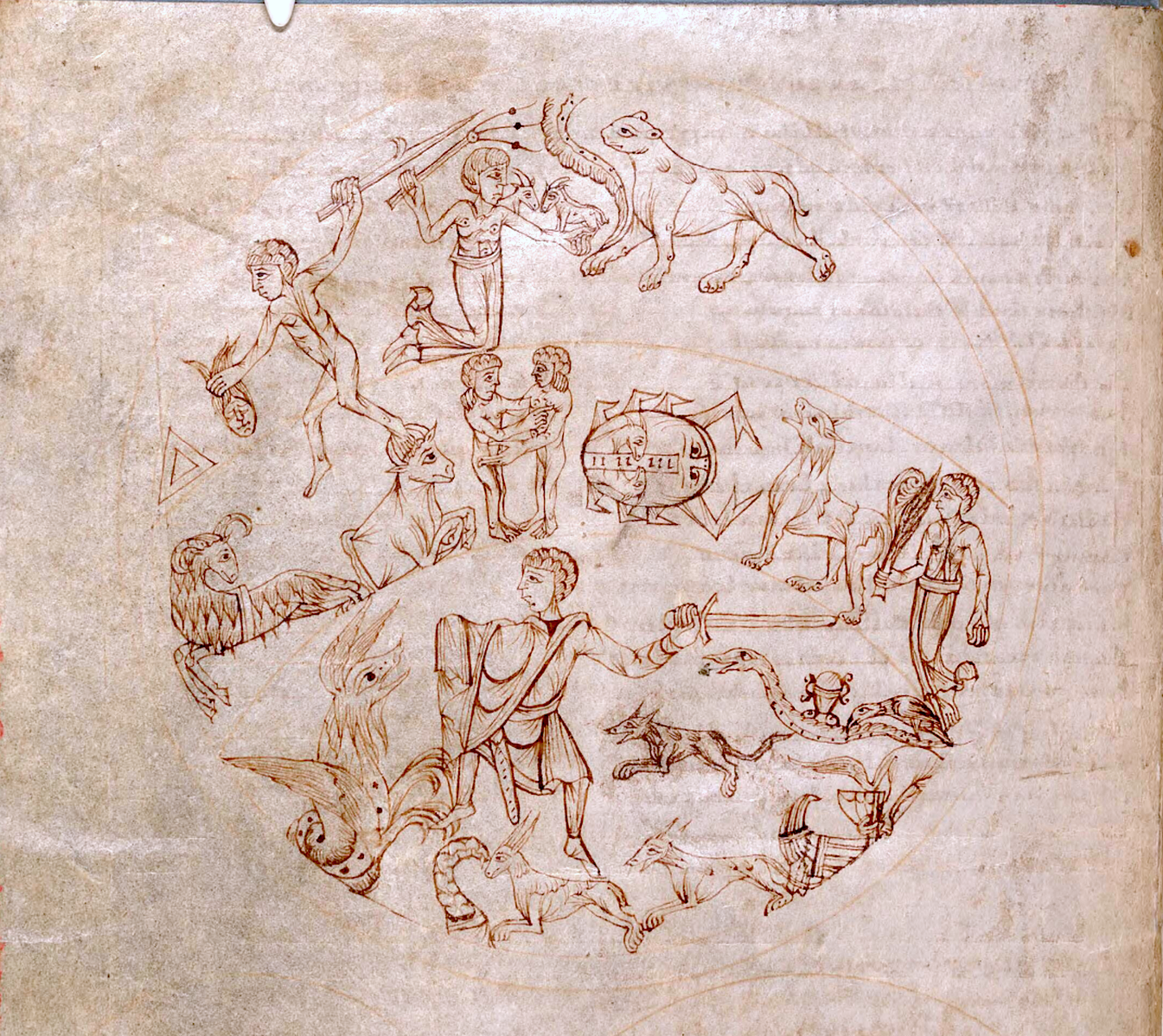
Depiction of the southern hemisphere constellations in an 11th-century French manuscript (from the Limoges area, probably in the milieu of Adémar de Chabannes, fl. 1020–1034)

Glyph	Constellation	Tropical zodiac dates	Sidereal zodiac dates (Lahiri ayanamsa)	Dates based on 14 equal length sign zodiac used by Schmidt (Note: Schmidt (1970) added a Sun sign for Cetus, falling between Aries and Taurus from May 12 – June 6, as well as the more often seen addition of Ophiuchus, q.v. (Note: Ophiuchus is not a sign in traditional forms of tropical and sidereal astrology, and only appears in a few forms of astrology which use the nominal constellation boundaries adopted by the IAU.). However, his symbols for Cetus and Ophiuchus are not the same as the symbols used here. Under the IAU constellation boundaries, the sign of Cetus corresponds to the half of Taurus mostly west of Aldebaran and the Hyades, while the Taurus sign corresponds to the half of Taurus east of Aldebaran and the Hyades.)	Based on IAU boundaries
	Aries	Mar 21 – Apr 19	Apr 14 – May 14	Apr 16 – May 11	Apr 18 – May 13
	Cetus	—N/a	—N/a	May 12 – Jun 6	—N/a (Note: While the ecliptic does not cross the boundary of Cetus, it comes within 9 arcminutes at its closest point, which means the edge of the Sun briefly enters this constellation around March 27–28.)
	Taurus	Apr 20 – May 20	May 15 – Jun 15	Jun 7 – Jul 2	May 13 – Jun 21
	Gemini	May 21 – Jun 20	Jun 16 – Jul 16	Jul 3 – Jul 28	Jun 21 – Jul 20
	Cancer	Jun 21 – Jul 22	Jul 17 – Aug 16	Jul 29 – Aug 23	Jul 20 – Aug 10
	Leo	Jul 23 – Aug 22	Aug 17 – Sep 16	Aug 24 – Sep 18	Aug 10 – Sep 16
	Virgo	Aug 23 – Sep 22	Sep 17 – Oct 16	Sep 19 – Oct 14	Sep 16 – Oct 30
	Libra	Sep 23 – Oct 22	Oct 17 – Nov 15	Oct 15 – Nov 9	Oct 30 – Nov 23
	Scorpio	Oct 23 – Nov 21	Nov 16 – Dec 15	Nov 10 – Dec 5	Nov 23 – Nov 29
	Ophiuchus	—N/a	—N/a	Dec 6 – Dec 31	Nov 29 – Dec 17
	Sagittarius	Nov 22– Dec 21	Dec 16 – Jan 14	Jan 1 – Jan 26	Dec 17 – Jan 20
	Capricorn	Dec 22 – Jan 19	Jan 15 – Feb 12	Jan 27 – Feb 21	Jan 20 – Feb 16
	Aquarius	Jan 20 – Feb 18	Feb 13 – Mar 14	Feb 22 – Mar 20	Feb 16 – Mar 11
	Pisces	Feb 19 – Mar 20	Mar 15 – Apr 13	Mar 21 – Apr 15	Mar 11 – Apr 18

As each sign takes up exactly 30 degrees of the zodiac, the average duration of the solar stay in each sign is one twelfth of a sidereal year, or 30.43 standard days. Due to Earth's slight orbital eccentricity, the duration of each sign varies appreciably, between about 29.4 days for Capricorn and about 31.4 days for Cancer (see Equation of time). In addition, because the Earth's axis is at an angle, some signs take longer to rise than others, and the farther away from the equator the observer is situated, the greater the difference. Thus, signs are spoken of as "long" or "short" ascension.

== Constellations ==
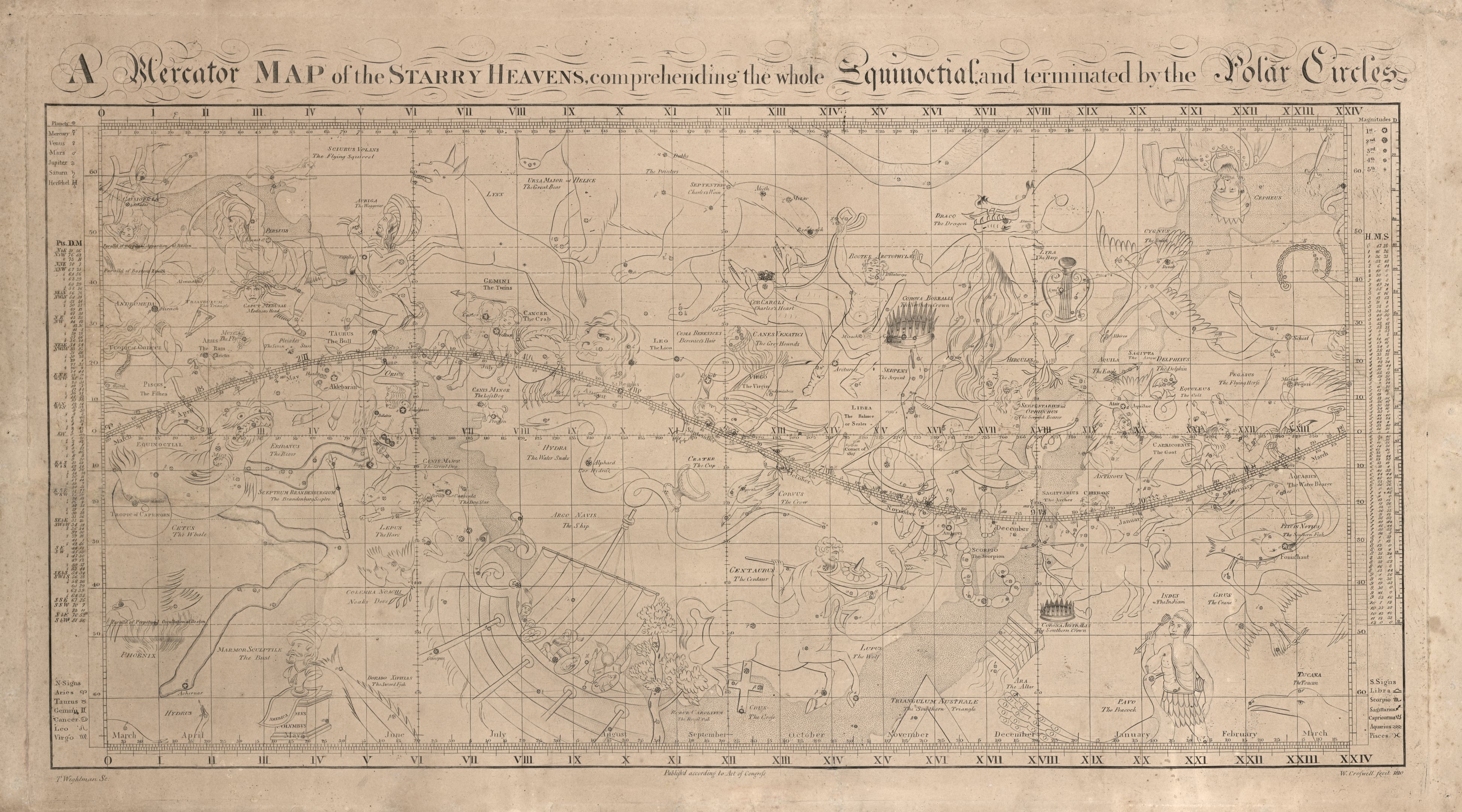
These two maps of the constellations, made two centuries apart, both show the zodiac constellations along a curved line representing the ecliptic.

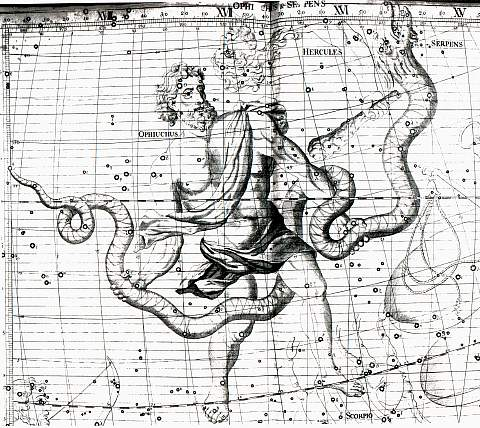
18th-century star chart illustrating the feet of Ophiuchus crossing the ecliptic

In tropical astrology, the zodiacal signs are distinct from the constellations associated with them, not only because of their drifting apart due to the precession of equinoxes but because the physical constellations take up varying widths of the ecliptic, so the Sun is not in each constellation for the same amount of time. Thus, Virgo takes up 5 times as much ecliptic longitude as Scorpius. The zodiacal signs are an abstraction from the physical constellations, and each represent exactly 1/12th of the full circle, but the time spent by the Sun in each sign varies slightly due to the eccentricity of the Earth's orbit.

Sidereal astrology assigns the zodiac sign approximately to the corresponding constellation. This alignment needs recalibrating every so often to keep the alignment in place.

The ecliptic intersects with 13 constellations of Ptolemy's Almagest, as well as of the more precisely delineated IAU designated constellations. In addition to the twelve constellations after which the twelve zodiac signs are named, the ecliptic intersects Ophiuchus, the bottom part of which interjects between Scorpius and Sagittarius. Occasionally this difference between the astronomical constellations and the astrological signs is mistakenly reported in the popular press as a "change" to the list of traditional signs by some astronomical body like the IAU, NASA, or the Royal Astronomical Society. This happened in a 1995 report of the BBC Nine O'Clock News and various reports in 2011 and 2016.

Some "parazodiacal" constellations are touched by the paths of the planets, leading to counts of up to 25 "constellations of the zodiac". The ancient Babylonian MUL.APIN catalog lists Orion, Perseus, Auriga, and Andromeda. Modern astronomers have noted that planets pass through Crater, Sextans, Cetus, Pegasus, Corvus, Hydra, Orion, and Scutum, with Venus very rarely passing through Aquila, Canis Minor, Auriga, and Serpens.

Some other constellations are mythologically associated with the zodiacal ones: Piscis Austrinus, The Southern Fish, is attached to Aquarius. In classical maps, it swallows the stream poured out of Aquarius's pitcher, but perhaps it formerly just swam in it. Aquila, The Eagle, was possibly associated with the zodiac by virtue of its main star, Altair. Hydra in the Early Bronze Age marked the celestial equator and was associated with Leo, which is shown standing on the serpent on the Dendera zodiac.

Name	1977 IAU boundaries (approximate)	Solar stay	Brightest star
Aries	19 April – 13 May	25 days	Hamal
Taurus	14 May – 19 June	37 days	Aldebaran
Gemini	20 June – 20 July	31 days	Pollux
Cancer	21 July – 9 August	20 days	Tarf
Leo	10 August – 15 September	37 days	Regulus
Virgo	16 September – 30 October	45 days	Spica
Libra	31 October – 22 November	23 days	Zubeneschamali
Scorpius	23 November – 29 November	7 days	Antares
Ophiuchus	30 November – 17 December	18 days	Rasalhague
Sagittarius	18 December – 18 January	32 days	Kaus Australis
Capricornus	19 January – 15 February	28 days	Deneb Algedi
Aquarius	16 February – 11 March	24 days	Sadalsuud
Pisces	12 March – 18 April	38 days	Alpherg

== Precession of the equinoxes ==
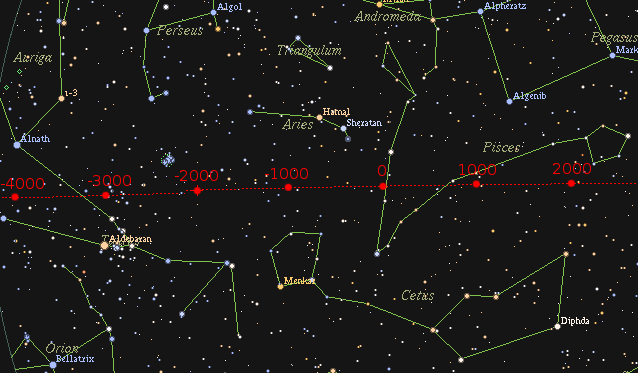
Path taken by the point of the March equinox along the ecliptic over the past 6,000 years

The zodiac system was developed in Babylonia, some 2,500 years ago, during the "Age of Aries". At the time, it is assumed, the precession of the equinoxes was unknown. Contemporary use of the coordinate system is presented with the choice of interpreting the system either as sidereal, with the signs fixed to the stellar background, or as tropical, with the signs fixed to the point (vector of the Sun) at the March equinox.

Western astrology takes the tropical approach, whereas Hindu astrology takes the sidereal one. This results in the originally unified zodiacal coordinate system drifting apart gradually, with a clockwise (westward) precession of 1.4 degrees per century.

For the tropical zodiac used in Western astronomy and astrology, this means that the tropical sign of Aries currently lies somewhere within the constellation Pisces ("Age of Pisces").

The sidereal coordinate system takes into account the ayanamsa, ayan meaning "transit" or "movement", and amsa meaning 'small part', i.e. movement of equinoxes in small parts. It is unclear when Indians became aware of the precession of the equinoxes, but Bhāskara II's 12th-century treatise Siddhanta Shiromani gives equations for measurement of precession of equinoxes, and says his equations are based on some lost equations of Suryasiddhanta plus the equation of Munjaala.

The discovery of precession is attributed to Hipparchus around 130 BC. Ptolemy quotes from Hipparchus's now-lost work entitled "On the Displacement of the Solstitial and Equinoctial Points" in the seventh book of his 2nd century astronomical text, Almagest, where he describes the phenomenon of precession and estimates its value. Ptolemy clarified that the convention of Greek mathematical astronomy was to commence the zodiac from the point of the vernal equinox and to always refer to this point as "the first degree" of Aries. This is known as the "tropical zodiac" (from the Greek word trópos, turn) because its starting point revolves through the circle of background constellations over time.

The principle of the vernal point acting as the first degree of the zodiac for Greek astronomers is described in the 1st century BC astronomical text of Geminus of Rhodes. Geminus explains that Greek astronomers of his era associate the first degrees of the zodiac signs with the two solstices and the two equinoxes, in contrast to the older Chaldean (Babylonian) system, which placed these points within the zodiac signs. This illustrates that Ptolemy merely clarified the convention of Greek astronomers and did not originate the principle of the tropical zodiac, as is sometimes assumed.

Ptolemy demonstrates that the principle of the tropical zodiac was well known to his predecessors within his astrological text, the Tetrabiblos, where he explains why it would be an error to associate the regularly spaced signs of the seasonally aligned zodiac with the irregular boundaries of the visible constellations:

The beginnings of the signs, and likewise those of the terms, are to be taken from the equinoctial and tropical points. This rule is not only clearly stated by writers on the subject, but is especially evident by the demonstration constantly afforded, that their natures, influences and familiarities have no other origin than from the tropics and equinoxes, as has been already plainly shown. And, if other beginnings were allowed, it would either be necessary to exclude the natures of the signs from the theory of prognostication, or impossible to avoid error in then retaining and making use of them; as the regularity of their spaces and distances, upon which their influence depends, would then be invaded and broken in upon.

== In modern astronomy ==
Two false dawns, gegenschein (middle) and the rest of the zodiacal band of the zodiacal light, with the zodiac marked (visually crossed by the Milky Way), in this composite image of the night sky above the northern and southern hemisphere

Astronomically, the zodiac defines a belt of space extending 8° or 9° in celestial latitude to the north and south of the ecliptic, within which the orbits of the Moon and the principal planets remain. It is a feature of the ecliptic coordinate system – a celestial coordinate system centered upon the ecliptic (the plane of the Earth's orbit and the Sun's apparent path), by which celestial longitude is measured in degrees east of the vernal equinox (the ascending intersection of the ecliptic and equator). The zodiac is narrow in angular terms because most of the Sun's planets have orbits that have only a slight inclination to the orbital plane of the Earth. Stars within the zodiac are subject to occultations by the Moon and other Solar System bodies. These events can be useful, for example, to estimate the cross-sectional dimensions of a minor planet, or check a star for a close companion.

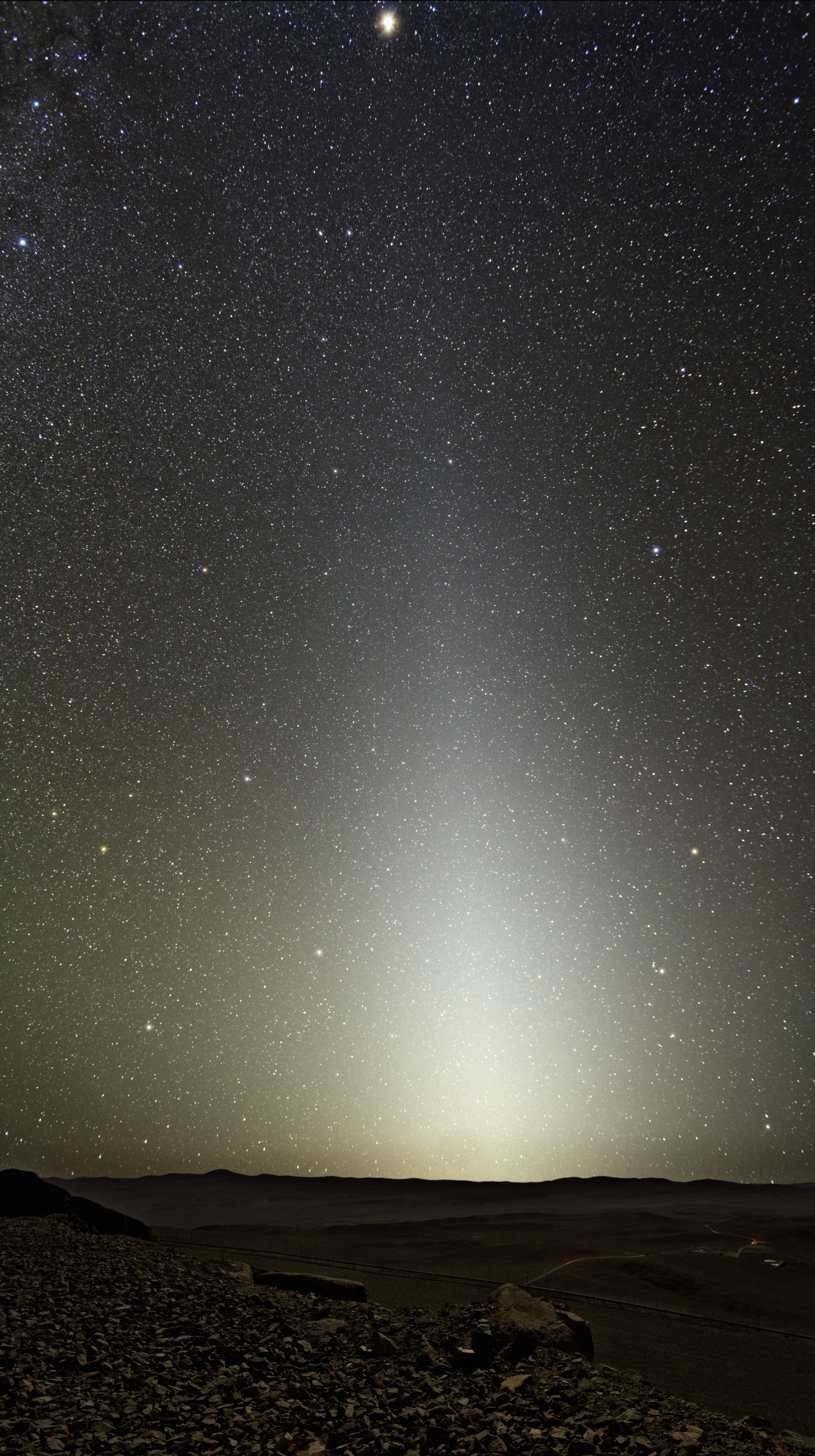
Zodiacal light viewed from Cerro Paranal

The Sun's placement upon the vernal equinox, which occurs annually around 21 March, defines the starting point for measurement, the first degree of which is historically known as the "first point of Aries". The first 30° along the ecliptic is nominally designated as the zodiac sign Aries, which no longer falls within the proximity of the constellation Aries since the effect of precession is to move the vernal point through the backdrop of visible constellations. It is currently located near the end of the constellation Pisces, having been within that constellation since the 2nd century AD. The subsequent 30° of the ecliptic is nominally designated the zodiac sign Taurus, and so on through the twelve signs of the zodiac so that each occupies 1/12th (30°) of the zodiac's great circle. Zodiac signs have never been used to determine the boundaries of astronomical constellations that lie in the vicinity of the zodiac, which are, and always have been, irregular in their size and shape.

The convention of measuring celestial longitude within individual signs was still being used in the mid-19th century, but modern astronomy now numbers degrees of celestial longitude continuously from 0° to 360°, rather than 0° to 30° within each sign. This coordinate system is primary used by astronomers for observations of Solar System objects.

The use of the zodiac as a means to determine astronomical measurement remained the main method for defining celestial positions by Western astronomers until the Renaissance, at which time preference moved to the equatorial coordinate system, which measures astronomical positions by right ascension and declination rather than the ecliptic-based definitions of celestial longitude and celestial latitude. The orientation of equatorial coordinates are aligned with the Earth's axis of rotation, rather than the plane of the planet's orbit around the Sun.

The word "zodiac" is used in reference to the zodiacal cloud of dust grains that move among the planets, and the zodiacal light that originates from their scattering of sunlight. While its name is derived from the zodiac, the zodiacal light covers the entire night sky, with enhancements in certain directions.

== Unicode characters ==
In Unicode, the symbols of zodiac signs are encoded in block "Miscellaneous Symbols". They can be forced to look like text by appending U+FE0E, or like emojis by appending U+FE0F:

Unicode character	text	emoji
U+2648 ♈ ARIES	♈︎	♈️
U+2649 ♉ TAURUS	♉︎	♉️
U+264A ♊ GEMINI	♊︎	♊️
U+264B ♋ CANCER	♋︎	♋️
U+264C ♌ LEO	♌︎	♌️
U+264D ♍ VIRGO	♍︎	♍️
U+264E ♎ LIBRA	♎︎	♎️
U+264F ♏ SCORPIUS	♏︎	♏️
U+2650 ♐ SAGITTARIUS	♐︎	♐️
U+2651 ♑ CAPRICORN	♑︎	♑️
U+2652 ♒ AQUARIUS	♒︎	♒️
U+2653 ♓ PISCES	♓︎	♓️
U+26CE ⛎ OPHIUCHUS	⛎︎	⛎️

== See also ==
- Astronomical symbols – Symbols in astronomy
- Chinese zodiac – Lunar calendar classification in a 12-year cycle
- Circle of stars – Symbolic motif
- Cusp (astrology) – Imaginary line that separates a pair of consecutive astrological signs in the zodiac
- Elements of the zodiac – Elements in zodiac signs
- History of astrology
- Jewish astrology
- Mazzaroth – Biblical term for the Zodiac
