= Synoptical astrology =

Dual approach to astrology using two methods

The theory of synoptical astrology was created by László Wladimir Orosz, Hungarian philosopher and astrologer.

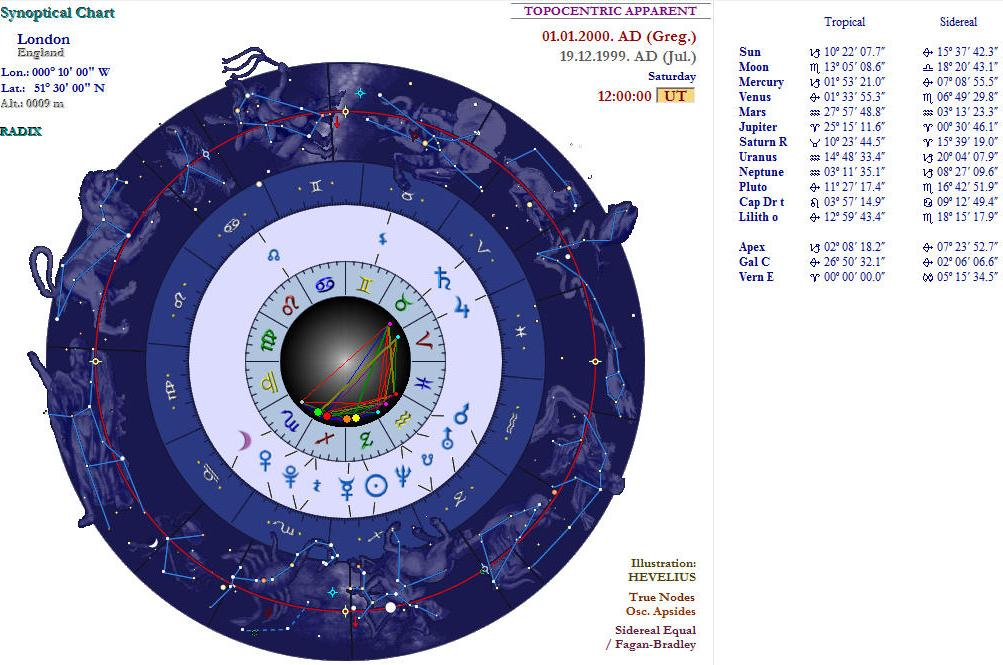
Synoptical astrology chart with equal sidereal zodiac and constellational sectors

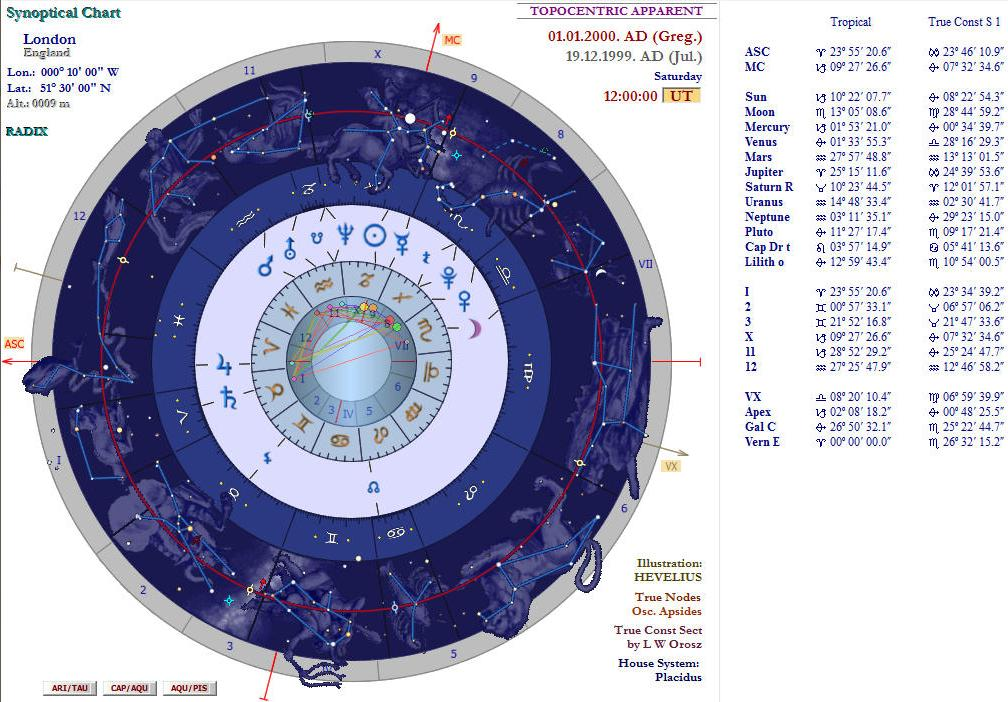
Synoptical astrology horoscope with unequal constellational zodiac and constellational sectors

This synopsis considers the tropical and the sidereal zodiacs simultaneously with the constellational zodiac or the real zodiacal constellations.

By this approach, the tropical frame represents the destined 'earthly' road, the personal life path and emphasizes mostly the psychic, somatic and psychosomatic elements of the nativities – in analogy with the gross body and the waking state, the sidereal and the real constellational ones give information on the spiritual (pneumatic) relations and reveals the After Death (post mortem) Conditions - in analogy with the subtle body and the dream state. In the sidereal frame, this school prefers the Fagan-Bradley ayanāṃśa .

The synoptical horoscope has its own unique way of drawing: we can view the tropical signs inside of the chartwheel, the sidereal zodiac is in the middle and the real constellations can be found in the outermost zone.

Since the real constellations are unequal, synoptical astrology divides the sectors uniquely. To measure these unequal sectors 'dynamic degrees' are introduced.

A constellational sector is opened by the first 'fixed' star (in the direction of the planets' common moving) that is clearly belonging to the given constellation and traditionally considered so. The sector is bordered by the first 'marker' star of the next constellation. The ecliptic plane divides the sectors into northern and southern regions in some cases e. g. Aries - Taurus or Aquarius - Pisces, so, for example, a planet with northern ecliptic latitude enters the constellation of Pisces much sooner than one with southern latitude – in this system. Concerning the astrological aspects, Synoptical Astrology focuses also on the arithmological characteristics of the natural number (positive integer) which divide the circle of 360 degrees.

The unequal constellational sectors in the Synoptical Astrology are below.

| Symbol | Constellation | English name | First Marker Star | Tropical frame (J2000.0) |
|---|---|---|---|---|
| | Capricorn | The Mountain Sea-Goat | Algiedi - α Cap | 303.76° - Aqr 3.76° |
| | Aquarius | The Water-Bearer | Albali - ε Aqr (N. Lat.) ι Aqr (S. Lat.) | 311.71° - Aqr 11.71° (N. Lat.); 328.71° - Aqr 28.71° (S. Lat.) |
| | Pisces | The Fish | Fum Alsamakah - β Psc (N. Lat.) ε Psc (S. Lat.) | 348.58° - Psc 18.58° (N. Lat.); 17.52° - Ari 17.52° (S. Lat.) |
| | Aries | The Ram | Mesarthim - γ Ari | 33.18° - Tau 3.18° |
| | Taurus | The Bull | ο Tau (S. Lat.); Alcyone - η Tau (N. Lat.) | 51.16° - Tau 21.16° (S. Lat.); 59.99° - Tau 29.99° (N. Lat.) |
| | Gemini | The Twins | Propus - η Gem | 93.44° - Cnc 3.44° |
| | Cancer | The Crab | Tegmen - ζ Cnc | 121.34° - Leo 1.34° |
| | Leo | The Lion | Alminliar - κ Leo | 135.30° - Leo 15.30° |
| | Virgo | Virgo | Zavijava - β Vir | 177.16° - Vir 27.16° |
| | Libra | The Scales | Zuben Elgenubi - α Lib | 225.08° - Sco 15.08° |
| | Scorpio | The Scorpion | Dschubba - δ Sco | 242.56° - Sgr 2.56° |
| | Sagittarius | The Archer | Alnasl - γ Sgr | 271.25° - Cap 1.25° |

Moreover, this synoptical approach includes the display of several lunar mansion systems (Indian, Chinese, Arabic, Scythian and others) based on either tropical or sidereal/constellational frame (view examples).

== Sources ==
- Gettings, Fred (1991). The Arkana Dictionary of Astrology. Penguin Books. ISBN 0140192875.
- Orosz, Laszlo Wladimir (2001). A Jelen. Stalker. ISBN 9630086336.
- Hone, Margaret (2010). The Modern Textbook of Astrology. Astrology Classics. ISBN 978-1933303352.
