= Astrological age =

Time period in ancient historical and astrological theories of time

An astrological age is a time period which, according to astrology, parallels major changes in the development of human society, culture, history, and politics. There are twelve astrological ages corresponding to the twelve zodiacal signs in western astrology. One cycle of the twelve astrological ages is called a Great Year, comprising 25,772 solar years, at the end of which another cycle begins.

Some astrologers believe that during a given age, some events are directly caused or indirectly influenced by the astrological sign associated with that age, while other astrologers believe that astrological ages do not influence events in any way.

Astrologers do not agree upon exact dates for the beginning or ending of the ages, with given dates varying by hundreds of years.

== Overview ==
The traditional western Zodiac signs

There are three broad perspectives on the astrological ages:

1. Archeoastronomers do not necessarily believe in astrology as a science, but rather study the cultural traditions of societies that did refer extensively to astrology.
2. Astrologers have been interested in relating world history to the astrological ages since the late 19th century; however, most astrologers study horoscopes, not astrological ages.
3. The pop-culture concept of the Age of Aquarius referring to major societal changes of the 1960s, popularized in the 1967 musical (and subsequent 1979 film) Hair.

The following table of astrological ages was compiled by Neil Mann, giving commonly cited durations for each era, as well as developments in human history typically believed to have been influenced by the vernal equinox sign of their age. He notes that the claims of zodiac influences on human history are biased, relying on widely varying dates for events and selective cherry picking of evidence.

Age	Start date	End date	Typical astrological associations
Age of Libra	15150 BCE	13000 BCE	Lascaux cave paintings, Settlement of the Americas
Age of Virgo	13000 BCE	10750 BCE	End of the Last Glacial Maximum, beginning of Pre-Pottery Neolithic
Age of Leo	10750 BCE	8600 BCE	Pre-Pottery Neolithic A and beginning of B
Age of Cancer	8600 BCE	6450 BCE	Pre-Pottery Neolithic B, beginning of urbanization
Age of Gemini	6450 BCE	4300 BCE	Pre-Pottery Neolithic C, Late Neolithic, beginning of the Chalcolithic
Age of Taurus	4300 BCE	2150 BCE	Invention of writing, the Bronze Age and the rise of its associated civilizations, such as Sumer, Ancient Egypt, and the Indus Valley civilization, near-Eastern bull cults
Age of Aries	2150 BCE	1 CE	The Akkadian Empire, the Vedic period in India, onset of the Iron Age, Ancient Greece, Phoenician Empire, Ancient Israel, classical antiquity and the Axial Age, rise of Buddhism
Age of Pisces	1 CE	2150 CE	Rise of the Roman Empire, Christianity (symbolised early on as the ichthys)
Age of Aquarius	2150 CE	4300	Predicted to feature humanitarianism and innovations in communication and travel

=== Contentious aspects ===
Definitive details on the astrological ages are lacking or disputed. The 20th-century British astrologer Charles Carter stated that "It is probable that there is no branch of Astrology upon which more nonsense has been poured forth than the doctrine of the precession of the equinoxes."

Neil Spencer in his 2000 book True as the Stars Above expressed a similar opinion about the astrological ages. Spencer characterizes the concept as being "fuzzy", "speculative", and the least-defined area of astrological lore. Derek and Julia Parker state that it is impossible to state the exact date for the start of any astrological age and acknowledge that many astrologers believe the Age of Aquarius has arrived while many say the world is at the end of the Age of Pisces.

Ray Grasse states in Signs of the Times that "there is considerable dispute over the exact starting and ending times for the different Great Ages." Paul Wright in The Great Ages and Other Astrological Cycles says that much of the uncertainty related to the astrological ages is because many astrologers have a poor understanding of the meaning of the astrological symbolism and "even poorer historical knowledge".

=== Consensus approach ===
Though so many issues are contentious or disputed, there are two aspects of the astrological ages that have virtually unanimous consensus—firstly, the theorized link of the astrological ages to the axial precession of the Earth and commonly referred to as precession of the equinoxes; secondly, that, due to the nature of the precession of the equinoxes, the progression of the ages proceeds in reverse direction through the zodiacal signs.

=== Ages of equal or variable lengths ===
Astrologers use many ways to divide the Great Year into twelve astrological ages. There are two popular methods. One method is to divide the Great Year into twelve astrological ages of approximately equal lengths of around 2156 years per age based on the vernal equinox (also known as vernal point) moving through the sidereal zodiac. Another method is to significantly vary the duration of each astrological age based on the passage of the vernal equinox measured against the actual zodiacal constellations. Each of those twelve sections of the Great Year can be called either an astrological age, Precessional Age, or a Great Month.

The method based on the zodiacal constellations has a flaw in that from the reckoning of classical-era astronomer/astrologers like Claudius Ptolemy, many constellations overlap, a problem only eliminated in the past 200 years by the adoption of official constellation boundaries. For example, by 2700 CE the vernal point will have moved into Aquarius, but from a classical-era point of view, the vernal point will also point to Pisces due to the pre-boundary overlap.

=== Age transitions ===
Many astrologers consider the entrance into a new astrological age a gradual transition called a "cusp". For example, Ray Grasse states that an astrological age does not begin at an exact day or year. Paul Wright states that a transition effect does occur at the border of the astrological ages. Consequently, the beginning of any age cannot be defined to a single year or a decade but blend its influences with the previous age for a period of time until the new age can stand in its own right. In Nicholas Campion's The Book of World Horoscopes there are six pages listing researchers and their proposed dates for the start of the Age of Aquarius indicating that many researchers believe that each age commences at an exact date.

=== Other opinions ===
==== Ages exactly 2,000 years each ====
Many astrologers find ages too erratic based on either the vernal point moving through the randomly sized zodiacal constellations or sidereal zodiac and, instead, round all astrological ages to exactly 2000 years each. In this approach the ages are usually neatly aligned so that the Aries age is found from 2000 BC to AD 1, Pisces age AD 1 to AD 2000, the Aquarian Age AD 2000 – AD 4000, and so on. This approach is inconsistent with the precession of the equinoxes. Based on precession of the equinoxes, there is a one-degree shift approximately every 72 years, so a 30-degree movement requires 2160 years to complete.

==== Ages involving the opposite sign ====
An established school of thought is that an age is also influenced by the sign opposite to that of the astrological age. Referring back to the precession of the Equinoxes, as the Sun crosses one constellation in the Northern Hemisphere's spring Equinox (21 March), it will cross the opposite sign in the spring Equinox in the Southern Hemisphere (21 September). For instance, the Age of Pisces is complemented by its opposite astrological sign of Virgo (the Virgin); so a few refer to the Piscean age as the 'Age of Pisces-Virgo'. Adopting this approach, the Age of Aquarius would become the Age of Aquarius-Leo. In his writings Ray Grasse also espouses the link between each sign of the zodiac and its opposite sign.

== History ==
=== Hipparchus and the discovery of the precession of the equinoxes ===
Hipparchus of Nicaea (c. 190–120 BCE) is often credited with the discovery of the precession of the equinoxes, a fundamental astronomical phenomenon that plays a crucial role in the concept of astrological ages. Precession refers to the gradual shift in the orientation of Earth's axis of rotation, which causes the positions of the equinoxes to move slowly westward along the ecliptic, completing a full cycle approximately every 26,000 years.

Hipparchus made this discovery while comparing his observations of the positions of stars with records from earlier astronomers, particularly those from Babylon. He noticed that the positions of certain fixed stars had shifted relative to the equinoxes over time, an observation that could not be explained by the prevailing astronomical models of his time. In his work, Hipparchus noted that the position of the vernal equinox had shifted by about 2° relative to the stars over the course of a century, which implied a slow, continuous motion of the celestial sphere.

This discovery was groundbreaking because it revealed that the celestial sphere was not as fixed as previously thought. Hipparchus' calculation of the precession rate was remarkably close to the modern value, estimating it at roughly 1° per century, which is only slightly different from the current measurement of approximately 1° every 72 years.

Hipparchus' findings were later documented by the Alexandrian astronomer Claudius Ptolemy in his seminal work, the Almagest (c. 150 CE), where he further refined and expanded upon Hipparchus' observations. Ptolemy's Almagest became the standard reference for astronomers for many centuries and solidified the concept of precession in the astronomical canon.

The recognition of precession had profound implications for astrology, particularly in the development of the concept of astrological ages. As the equinoxes precess through the zodiac, they mark the beginning and end of these ages, each lasting roughly 2,160 years, based on the 12 zodiacal constellations. The shift from one age to another is thought to bring about significant cultural and spiritual changes, a belief that has influenced astrological thought since antiquity.

=== Post-Hipparchus ===
==== Trepidation ====
In the early post-Hipparchus period, two schools of thought developed about the slow shift of the fixed sphere of stars as discovered by Hipparchus. One school believed that at 1 degree shift per 100 years, the sphere of fixed stars would return to its starting point after 36,000 years. The trepidation school believed that the fixed stars first moved one way, then moved the other way – similar to a giant pendulum. It was believed that the 'swinging' stars first moved 8 degrees one direction, then reversed this 8 degrees travelling the other direction.

Theon of Alexandria in the 4th century AD includes trepidation when he wrote Small Commentary to the Handy Tables. In the 5th century AD, the Greek Neoplatonist philosopher Proclus mentions that both theories were being discussed. The Indians around the 5th century AD preferred the trepidation theory but because they had observed the movement of the fixed stars by 25 degrees since ancient times (since around 1325 BC), they considered that trepidation swung back and forth around 27 degrees.

The significant early exponent of the 'circular 36,000' years method was Ptolemy and, due to the status placed upon Ptolemy by later scholars, the Christian and Muslim astronomers of the Middle Ages accepted the Great Year of 36,000 years rather than trepidation. However some scholars gave credence to both theories based on the addition of another sphere which is represented in the Alfonsine tables produced by the Toledo School of Translators in the 12th and 13th centuries. The Alfonsine tables computed the positions of the sun, moon, and planets relative to the fixed stars. The Italian astronomer Cecco d'Ascoli, professor of astrology at the University of Bologna in the early 14th century, continued to have faith in trepidation but believed it swung 10 degrees in either direction. Copernicus refers to trepidation in De revolutionibus orbium coelestium published in 1543.

==== Mithraism ====
Hipparchus' discovery of precession of the equinoxes may have created the Mithraic Mysteries, colloquially also known as Mithraism, a 1st – 4th century neo-Platonic mystery cult of the Roman god Mithras. The near-total lack of written descriptions or scripture necessitates a reconstruction of beliefs and practices from the archaeological evidence, such as that found in Mithraic temples (in modern times called mithraea), which were real or artificial caves representing the cosmos. Until the 1970s most scholars followed Franz Cumont in identifying Mithras as a continuation of the Persian god Mithra. Cumont's continuity hypothesis led him to believe that the astrological component was a late and unimportant accretion.

Cumont's views are no longer followed. Today, the cult and its beliefs are recognized as a synthesis of late-classical Greco-Roman thought, with an astrological component even more astrology-centric than Roman beliefs generally were during the early Roman Empire. The details remain debated.

As far as axial precession is concerned, one scholar of Mithraism, David Ulansey, has interpreted Mithras as a personification of the force responsible for precession. He argues that the cult was a religious response to Hipparchus's discovery of precession, which – from the ancient geocentric perspective – amounted to the discovery that the entire cosmos (i.e., the outermost celestial sphere of the fixed stars) was moving in a previously unknown way. Ulansey's analysis is based on the tauroctony: the image of Mithras killing a bull that was placed at the center of every Mithraic temple. In the standard tauroctony, Mithras and the bull are accompanied by a dog, a snake, a raven, a scorpion and two identical young men, with torches.

According to Ulansey, the tauroctony is a schematic star chart. The bull is Taurus, a constellation of the zodiac. In the astrological age that preceded the time of Hipparchus, the vernal equinox had taken place when the Sun was in the constellation of Taurus, and during that previous epoch the constellations of Canis Minor (The Dog), Hydra (The Snake), Corvus (The Raven), and Scorpius (The Scorpion) – that is, the constellations that correspond to the animals depicted in the tauroctony – all lay on the celestial equator (the location of which is shifted by the precession) and thus had privileged positions in the sky during that epoch. Mithras himself represents the constellation Perseus, which is located directly above Taurus the Bull: The same location occupied by Mithras in the tauroctony image. Mithras' killing of the Bull, by this reasoning, represented the power possessed by this new god to shift the entire cosmic structure, turning the cosmic sphere so that the location of the spring equinox left the constellation of Taurus (a transition symbolized by the killing of the Bull), and the Dog, Snake, Raven, and Scorpion likewise lost their privileged positions on the celestial equator.

The iconography also contains two torch-bearing twins (Cautes and Cautopates) framing the bull-slaying image – one holding a torch pointing up and the other a torch pointing down. These torch-bearers are sometimes depicted with one of them (torch up) holding or associated with a Bull and a tree with leaves, and the other (torch down) holding or associated with a Scorpion and a tree with fruit. Ulansey interprets these torch-bearers as representing the spring equinox (torch up, tree with leaves, Bull) and the autumn equinox (torch down, tree with fruit, Scorpion) in Taurus and Scorpius respectively, which is where the equinoxes were located during the preceding "Age of Taurus" symbolized in the tauroctony as a whole.

From this, Ulansey concludes that Mithraic iconography was an "astronomical code" whose secret was the existence of a new cosmic divinity, unknown to those outside the cult, whose fundamental attribute was his ability to shift the structure of the entire cosmos, and thereby to control the astrological forces believed at that time to determine human existence. That gave him the power to grant his devotees success during life and salvation after death (i.e., a safe journey through the planetary spheres and a subsequent immortal existence in the sphere of the stars).

==== Rate of precession ====
Though the one degree per hundred years calculated for precession of the equinoxes as defined by Hipparchus and promulgated by Ptolemy was too slow, another rate of precession that was too fast also gained popularity in the 1st millennium AD. By the fourth century AD, Theon of Alexandria assumed a changing rate (trepidation) of one degree per 66 years. The tables of the Shah (Zij-i Shah) originate in the sixth century, but are lost, but many later Arabic and Persian astronomers and astrologers refer to them and also use this value.

These later astronomers-astrologers or sources include: Al-Khwarizmi, Zij al Sindhind or "Star Tables Based on the Indian Calculation Method"(c. 800); "Tabulae probatae" or "az-Zig al-mumtan" (c. 830); Al-Battani, Albategnius, al-Zij (c. 880); and al-Sufi, Azophi (c. 965); Al Biruni (973–1048), "al Canon al Masud" or "The Masʿūdic Canon"; Arabic fixed star catalogue of 1 October 1112 (ed. Paul Kunitzsch); and "Libros del Saber de Astronomía" by Alfonso X of Castile (1252–1284).

==== Anno Domini ====
There exists evidence that the modern calendar developed by Dionysius Exiguus in the 6th century AD commencing with the birth of Jesus Christ at AD 1 was influenced by precession of the equinoxes and astrological ages. Dionysius' desire to replace Diocletian years (Diocletian persecuted Christians) with a calendar based on the incarnation of Christ was to prevent people from believing the imminent end of the world. At the time it was believed that the Resurrection and end of the world would occur 500 years after the birth of Jesus. The current Anno Mundi calendar theoretically commenced with the creation of the world based on information in the Old Testament. It was believed that based on the Anno Mundi calendar Jesus was born in the year 5500 (or 5500 years after the world was created) with the year 6000 of the Anno Mundi calendar marking the end of the world.

Anno Mundi 6000 (approximately AD 500) was thus equated with the Second Coming of Christ and the end of the world. Since this date had already passed in the time of Dionysius, he therefore searched for a new end of the world at a later date. He was heavily influenced by ancient cosmology, in particular the doctrine of the Great Year that places a strong emphasis on planetary conjunctions. This doctrine says that when all the planets were in conjunction that this cosmic event would mark the end of the world. Dionysius accurately calculated that this conjunction would occur in May AD 2000. Dionysius then applied another astronomical timing mechanism based on precession of the equinoxes. Though incorrect, some oriental astronomers at the time believed that the precessional cycle was 24,000 years which included twelve astrological ages of 2,000 years each. Dionysius believed that if the planetary alignment marked the end of an age (i.e. the Pisces age), then the birth of Jesus Christ marked the beginning of the Age of Pisces 2,000 years earlier. He therefore deducted 2,000 years from the May 2000 conjunction to produce AD 1 for the incarnation of Christ.

==== Mashallah ibn Athari ====
The renowned Persian Jewish astronomer and astrologer Masha'Allah (c.740 – 815 CE) employed precession of the equinoxes for calculating the period "Era of the Flood" dated as 3360 BCE or 259 years before the Indian Kali Yuga, believed to have commenced in 3101 BCE.

==== Giovanni Pico della Mirandola ====
The 15th century Italian Renaissance philosopher Giovanni Pico della Mirandola published a massive attack on astrological predictions, but he did not object to all of astrology and he commented on the position of the vernal point in his day. Pico was aware of the effects of precession of the equinoxes and knew that the first point of Aries no longer existed in the constellation of Aries. Pico not only knew that the vernal point had shifted back into Pisces, he stated that in his time, the vernal point (zero degrees tropical Aries) was located at 2 degrees (sidereal) Pisces. This suggests that by whatever method of calculation he was employing, Pico expected the vernal point to shift into (sidereal) Aquarius age 144 years later as a one degree shift takes 72 years.

==== Isaac Newton ====
Isaac Newton (1642 – 1726–27 ) determined the cause of precession and established the rate of precession at 1 degree per 72 years, very close to the best value measured today, thus demonstrating the magnitude of the error in the earlier value of 1 degree per century.

== Calculation aspects ==
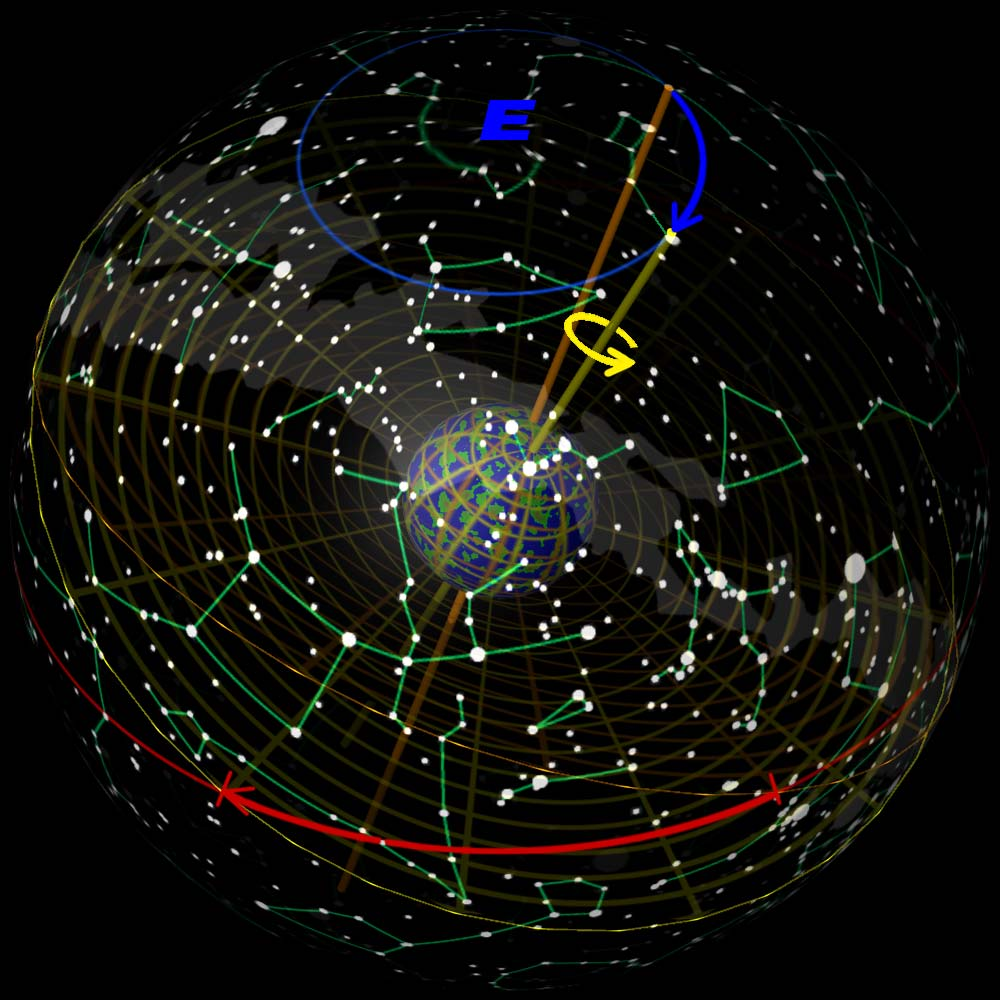
Precessional movement as seen from 'outside' the celestial sphere. The rotation axis of the Earth describes over a period of about 25,800 years a small circle (blue) among the stars, centred on the ecliptic northpole (blue E) and with an angular radius of about 23.4°: the angle known as the obliquity of the ecliptic. The orange axis was the Earth's rotation axis 5000 years ago when it pointed to the star Thuban. The yellow axis, pointing to Polaris is the situation now. Note that when the celestial sphere is seen from outside constellations appear in mirror image. Also note that the daily rotation of the Earth around its axis is opposite to the precessional rotation. When the polar axis precesses from one direction to another, then the equatorial plane of the Earth (indicated with the circular grid around the equator) and the associated celestial equator will move too. Where the celestial equator intersects the ecliptic (red line) there are the equinoxes. As seen from the drawing, the orange grid, 5000 years ago one intersection of equator and ecliptic, the vernal equinox was close to the star Aldebaran of Taurus. By now (the yellow grid) it has shifted (red arrow) to somewhere in the constellation of Pisces. Note that this is an astronomical description of the precessional movement and the vernal equinox position in a given constellation may not imply the astrological meaning of an Age carrying the same name, as they (ages and constellations) only have an exact alignment in the "first point of Aries", meaning once in each c. 25800 (Great Sidereal Year).

The Earth, in addition to its diurnal (daily) rotation upon its axis and annual rotation around the Sun, incurs a precessional motion involving a slow periodic shift of the axis itself: approximately one degree every 72 years. This motion, which is caused mostly by the Moon's gravity, gives rise to the precession of the equinoxes in which the Sun's position on the ecliptic at the time of the vernal equinox, measured against the background of fixed stars, gradually changes with time.

In graphical terms, the Earth behaves like a spinning top, and tops tend to wobble as they spin. The spin of the Earth is its daily (diurnal) rotation. The spinning Earth slowly wobbles over a period slightly less than 26,000 years. From our perspective on Earth, the stars are ever so slightly 'moving' from west to east at the rate of one degree approximately every 72 years. One degree is about twice the diameter of the Sun or Moon as viewed from Earth. The easiest way to notice this slow movement of the stars is at any fixed time each year. The most common fixed time is at the vernal equinox around 21 March each year.

In astrology, an astrological age has usually been defined by the constellation or superimposed sidereal zodiac in which the Sun actually appears at the vernal equinox. This is the method that Hipparchus appears to have applied around 127 BC when he calculated precession. Since each sign of the zodiac is composed of 30 degrees, each astrological age might be thought to last about 72 (years) × 30 (degrees) = about 2160 years.

This means the Sun crosses the equator at the vernal equinox moving backward against the fixed stars from one year to the next at the rate of one degree in seventy-two years, one constellation (on average) in about 2148 years, and the whole twelve signs in about 25,772 years, sometimes called a Platonic Year. However the length of the ages are decreasing with time as the rate of precession is increasing. Therefore, no two ages are of equal length.

=== First point of Aries alignment – the fiducial point ===
Approximately every 26,000 years the zodiacal constellations, the associated sidereal zodiac, and the tropical zodiac used by western astrologers basically align. Technically this is when the tropical and sidereal "first point in Aries" (Aries 0°) coincided. This alignment is often called the fiducial point and, if the fiducial point could be found, fairly exact timeframes of all the astrological ages could be accurately determined if the method used to determine the astrological ages is based on the equal-sized 30 degrees per age and do not correspond to the exact constellation configuration in the sky.

However this fiducial point is difficult to determine because while there is no ambiguity about the tropical zodiac used by western astrologers, the same cannot be said of the sidereal zodiac used by Vedic astrologers. Vedic astrologers do not have unanimity on the exact location in space of their sidereal zodiac. This is because the sidereal zodiac is superimposed upon the irregular zodiacal constellation, and there are no unambiguous boundaries of the zodiacal constellations.

Modern day astronomers have defined boundaries, but this is a recent development by astronomers who are divorced from astrology, and cannot be assumed to be correct from the astrological perspective. While most astronomers and some astrologers agree that the fiducial point occurred in or around the 3rd to 5th centuries AD, there is no consensus on any exact date or tight timeframe within these three centuries. A number of dates are proposed by various astronomers and even wider timeframes by astrologers. (For an alternative approach to calibrating precession, see Alternative approach to calibrating precession in New, alternative, and fringe theories section below).

As an example of a mystic contemporary approach to precession, in Max Heindel's astrology writings, it is described, that last time the starting-point of the sidereal zodiac agreed with the tropical zodiac occurred in AD 498. A year after these points were in exact agreement, the Sun crossed the equator about fifty seconds of space into the constellation Pisces. The year following it was one minute and forty seconds into Pisces, and so it has been creeping backward ever since, until at the present time the Sun crosses the equator in about nine degrees in the constellation Pisces. Based on this approach, it will thus be about 600 years before it actually crosses the celestial equator in the constellation Aquarius. However this is only one of many approaches and so this must remain speculation at this point of time.

== Present and future ages ==
=== Age of Pisces (Piscean Age) ===
Symbol for Pisces:

When the March equinox occurs in Pisces.

==== Timeframes ====
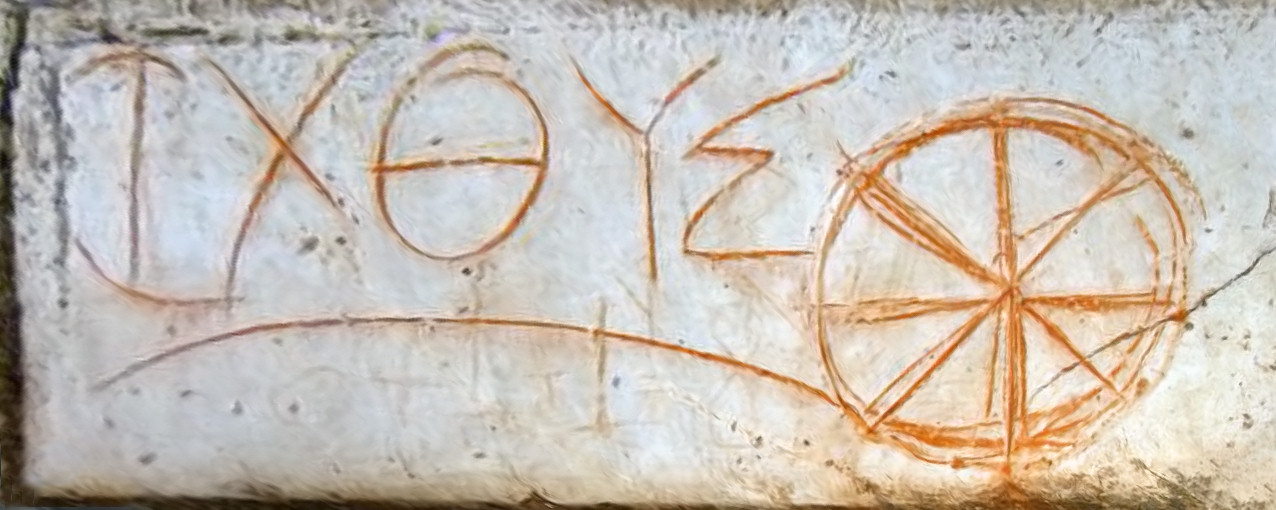
An early Christian inscription ichthys carved with Greek letters into marble in the ancient Greek ruins of Ephesus, Turkey

- Zodiacal 30 degrees:
  - Neil Mann interpretation: began c. AD 1 and ends c. AD 2150
  - Heindel-Rosicrucian interpretation: began c. AD 498 and ends c. AD 2654

=== Age of Aquarius (Aquarian Age) ===
Symbol for Aquarius:

When the March equinox occurs in Aquarius.

==== Timeframes ====
In 1928, at the Conference of the International Astronomical Union (IAU) in Leiden, the Netherlands, the edges of the 88 official constellations became defined in astronomical terms.

The Austrian astronomer Herman F. Haupt examined the question of when the Age of Aquarius begins in an article published in 1992 by the Austrian Academy of Science: with the German title "Der Beginn des Wassermannzeitalters, eine astronomische Frage?" ("The Start of the Aquarian Age, an Astronomical Question?"). Based on the boundaries accepted by IAU in 1928, Haupt's article investigates the start of the Age of Aquarius by calculating the entry of the spring equinox point over the parallel cycle (d = – 4°) between the constellations Pisces and Aquarius and reaches, using the usual formula of precession (Gliese, 1982), the year 2595. However Haupt concludes:

Though it cannot be expected that astrologers will follow the official boundaries of the constellations, there will be an attempt to calculate the entry of the spring equinox point into the constellation of Aquarius. [...] As briefly has been shown, the results and methods of astrology in many areas, such as concerning the Aquarian Age, are controversial on their own and cannot be called scientific because of the many esoteric elements.

- Zodiacal 30 degrees:
  - Neil Mann interpretation: begins AD 2150.
  - Dane Rudhyar's interpretation states that the Age of Aquarius will begin in AD 2062.
  - Nicholas Campion in The Book of World Horoscopes indicates that he has collected over 90 dates provided by researchers for the start of the Age of Aquarius and these dates have a range of over 2,000 years commencing in the 15th century AD. The range of dates for the possible start of the Aquarian Age range from 1447 to 3621.
- Constellation boundary year:
  - Hermann Haupt interpretation: begins c. AD 2595.

==== Astrological predictions ====
There is an expectation that the Aquarian Age will usher in a period of group consciousness. Marcia Moore and Mark Douglas write that the lighting up of the earth artificially by electricity is a sign of the Age of Aquarius.

== Sub-periods of ages ==
Many research astrologers believe that the astrological ages can be divided into smaller sections along the lines of 'wheels within wheels'. The most common method is to divide each astrological ages into twelve sub-periods. There are two common ways of undertaking this process and two ways of applying these sub-periods. Furthermore, some astrologers divide the ages in different ways. For example, David Williams employs a decanate sub-division whereby each age is divided into three equal sections.

=== Aries to Pisces sub-periods ===
The most popular method of sub-dividing astrological ages is to divide each age equally into twelve sub-periods with the first sub-period Aries, followed by Taurus, Gemini, and so on, until the last sub-division, Pisces. Charles Carter was an early advocate of this approach. Technically this approach is based on the twelfth harmonic of the zodiacal signs.

=== Dwadasamsa sub-periods ===
The alternative approach is to apply a method commonly used in Vedic astrology but with long antecedents also in Western astrology. This method also divides each astrological age into twelve sub-periods but the first sub-period for each sign is the same as the sign itself, then with the following sub-periods in natural order. For example, the twelve dwadasamsa of Aquarius are Aquarius, Pisces, Aries, Taurus, and so on, until the last dwadasamsa – Capricorn. Technically this approach is based on attributes of both the twelfth and thirteenth harmonics of the zodiacal signs and can be considered to be halfway between the 12th and 13th harmonics.

=== Sub-period direction (forward or retrograde?) ===
There are two ways of applying the above sub-periods to the astrological ages.

- Natural Order – The most common way is to arrange the sub-periods so that they go forward in the natural order. Therefore, if the Aries to Pisces method is adopted for example in the Aquarian Age, the first sub-period is Aries, followed by Taurus, Gemini and so on until the last sub-division – Pisces. This is the approach made by Charles Carter. If the dwadasamsa sub-period is adopted they also progress in the natural order of the signs. For example, the twelve dwadasamsa of Aquarius are Aquarius, Pisces, Aries, Taurus, and so on, until the last dwadasamsa – Capricorn.
- Geometric Order (Retrograde) – The other approach is to arrange the sub-periods geometrically and reverse the direction of the sub-periods in line with the retrograde order of the astrological ages. For example, if applying the Aries to Pisces method, the first sub-period of any astrological age is Pisces, followed by Aquarius, Capricorn, and so on, until the last sub-period – Aries. Charles Carter indicated there was some merit to this approach. If applying the dwadasamsa sub-period system geometrically for example the first sub-period in the Aquarian Age is Capricorn, followed by Sagittarius, Scorpio, and so on, until the last sub-period – Aquarius. This approach is adopted by Terry MacKinnell, Patrizia Norelli-Bachelet and David Williams applied his [decans] (threefold division) geometrically thus supporting this approach.

== New, alternative, and fringe myths ==
Due to the lack of consensus of almost all aspects of the astrological ages, except for the astrological ages relationship to precession of the equinoxes and the retrograde order of the astrological ages, there are alternative, esoteric, innovative, fringe and newly expressed ideas about the astrological ages which have not established credibility in the wider astrological community or among archaeoastronomers.

=== Alternative approach to calibrating precession ===
Terry MacKinnell has developed an alternative approach to calibrating precession of the equinoxes to determine the Astrological Age. His major point of departure from the traditional modern approach is how he applies the vernal equinox to the zodiacal constellations. Instead of referring to the position of the Sun at the vernal equinox (a 'modern' mathematical technique developed by the Greeks in the late 1st millennium BC), he refers to the heliacal rising constellation on the day of the vernal equinox. This approach is based on the ancient approach to astronomical observations (the same ancient period that also saw the invention of the zodiacal constellations) prior to the development of mathematical astronomy by the ancient Greeks in the 1st millennium BC. All ancient astronomical observations were based on visual techniques.

Of all the key techniques used in ancient times, the most common in Babylon (most likely the source of astrology) and most other ancient cultures were based on phenomena that occurred close to the eastern or western horizons.

The heliacal rising constellation at the vernal equinox is based on the last zodiacal constellation rising above the Eastern Horizon just before dawn and before the light of the approaching Sun obliterates the stars on the eastern horizon. Currently at the vernal equinox the constellation of Aquarius has been the heliacal rising constellation for some centuries. The stars disappear about one hour before dawn depending upon magnitude, latitude, and date. This one hour represents approximately 15 degrees difference compared to the contemporary method based on the position of the Sun among the zodiacal constellations.

Each age is composed of 30 degrees, therefore, 15 degrees represents about half an age or about 1080 years. Based on the heliacal rising method, the Age of Aquarius arrived about 1,080 years earlier than the modern system. John H Rogers in part one of his paper Origins of the ancient constellations also states that using the ancient heliacal rising method compared to the (modern) solar method produces a result that is approximately 1,000 in advance.

Using this approach, the astrological ages arrive about half an age earlier compared to the common contemporary approach to calibrating precession based on modern mathematical techniques. Thus, MacKinnell has the Aquarian Age arriving in the 15th century while most astrologers have the Age of Aquarius arriving in the 27th century, almost 700 years in the future.

== See also ==
- Aeon – Cosmic era in the religion of Thelema
- Astrology and science
- Astrotheology – Theological discipline
- Classical planet – Planets visible to the naked eye
- Great Year – Length of time
- Milankovitch cycles – Global climate cycles
- Sol Invictus – Late Roman solar deity
- Yuga – Age or era in Hinduism
- Zeitgeist – American documentary film series
