= Cyril Fagan =

Irish-born astrologer and astrological writer

Cyril Fagan (22 May 1896 – 5 January 1970) was an Irish astrologer known for his work in creating western sidereal astrology.

Born in Dublin in 1896, he is generally considered to be the father of sidereal astrology (alongside American astrologer Donald A. Bradley, the mother). Together they established the Fagan-Bradley Ayanamsha. Fagan died in 1970 in Tucson, Arizona, USA.

== Selected bibliography ==
- Astrological Origins, Zodiacs Old and New St. Paul, Minn.: Llewellyn Publications, 1971.
- Fixed Zodiac Ephemeris for 1948. Washington, D.C.: National Astrological Library, 1948.
- A Primer of the Sidereal Zodiac
- Zodiacs Old and New. Los Angeles: Llewellyn Publications, 1950.
