= Sidereal and tropical astrology =

Forms of astrology

In astrology, sidereal and tropical are terms that refer to two different systems of ecliptic coordinates used to divide the ecliptic into twelve "zodiac signs". Each sign is divided into 30 degrees, making a total of 360 degrees. The terms sidereal and tropical may also refer to two different definitions of a year, applied in sidereal solar calendars or tropical solar calendars.

Sidereal systems of astrology calculate twelve zodiac signs based on the observable sky and thus account for the apparent backwards movement of fixed stars of about 1 degree every 72 years from the perspective of the Earth due to the Earth's axial precession. In contrast, tropical systems consider 0 degrees of Aries as always coinciding with the March equinox (known as the spring equinox in the Northern Hemisphere) and define twelve zodiac signs from this starting point, basing their definitions upon the seasons and not upon the observable sky wherein the March equinox currently falls in Pisces due to the Earth's axial precession. These differences have caused sidereal and tropical zodiac systems, which were aligned around 2,000 years ago when the March equinox coincided with Aries in the observable sky, to drift apart over the centuries.

Sidereal astrology accounts for the Earth's axial precession and maintains the alignment between signs and constellations via corrective systems known as ayanamsas (from Sanskrit ayana 'movement' and aṃśa 'component'), whereas tropical astrology, to reiterate, is based upon the seasonal cycle of the Northern hemisphere and does not take axial precession into consideration. Though tropical astrology typically considers the zodiac of the Northern Hemisphere to be applicable without change to the Southern hemisphere, a small number of tropical astrologers modify the zodiac to reflect seasons in the Southern hemisphere, taking Libra as the sign that coincides with the spring equinox instead of Aries.

Ayanamsa systems used in Hindu astrology (also known as Vedic astrology) include the Lahiri ayanamsa and the Raman ayanamsa, of which the Lahiri ayanamsa is the most widely used. The Fagan-Bradley ayanamsa is an example of an ayanamsa system used in Western sidereal astrology. As of 2020, sun signs calculated using the Sri Yukteswar ayanamsa were around 23 degrees behind tropical sun signs. Per these calculations, persons born between March 12 – April 12, for instance, would have the sun sign of Pisces. Per tropical calculations, in contrast, persons born between March 21 – April 19 would have the sun sign of Aries.

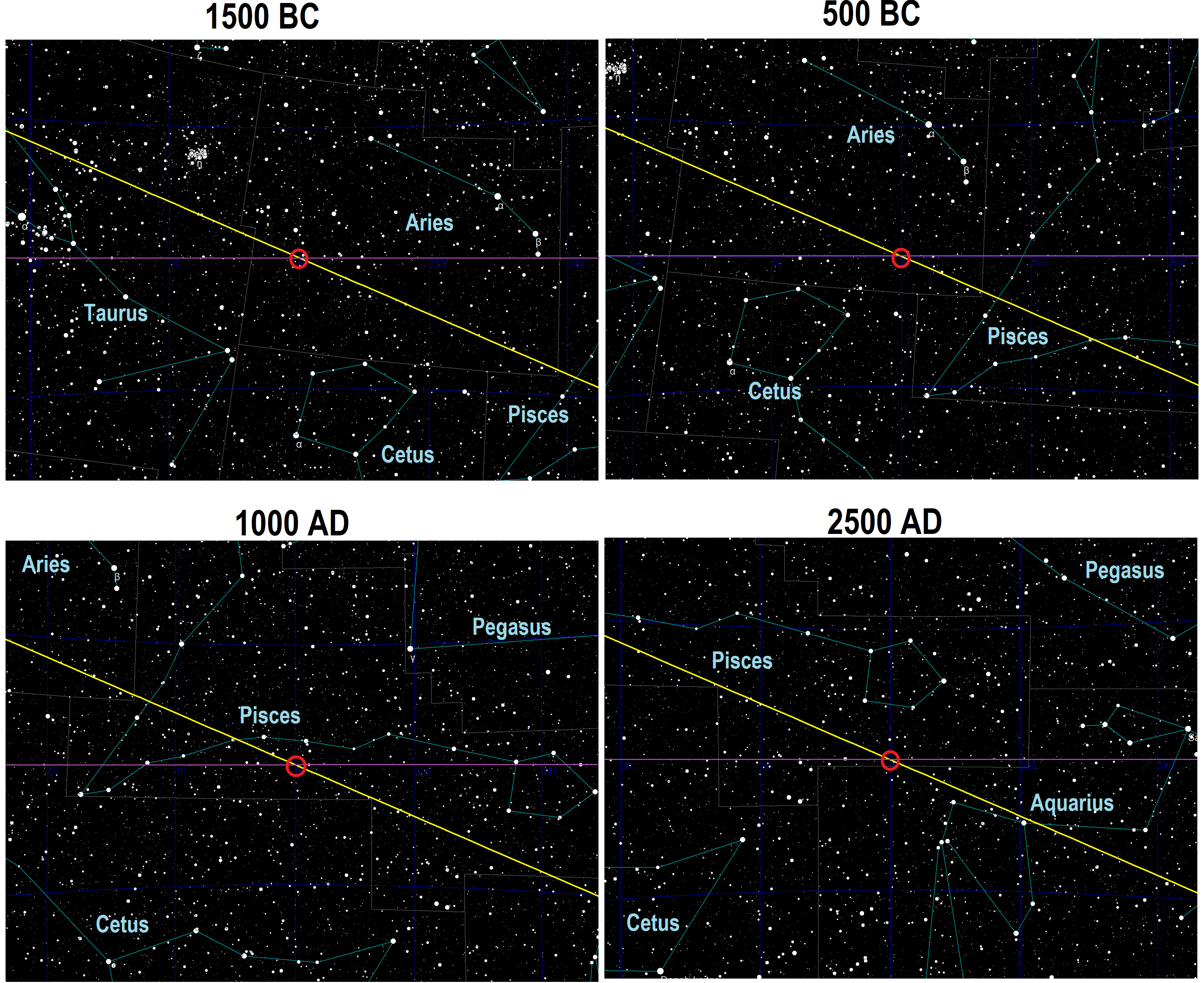
Precession of equinoxes, the changing position of the vernal equinox over the course of about 25,800 years. The yellow line is a section of the ecliptic, the apparent path the Sun appears to follow over the course of an Earth year. The purple line is the celestial equator, the projection of Earth's equator onto the celestial sphere. The point (red) where these two lines cross is the vernal equinox. In 1500 BCE, it was near the end of Aries; in 500 BCE, it was near the beginning of Aries; and in 1000 to 2500 CE Pisces.

== Astronomic zodiac ==
A map of the IAU-defined constellation boundaries with the equal length signs used in tropical astrology overlaid. One can see that, due to precession and the inequality in the sizes of constellations, it appears that the constellations the signs are based on have moved eastward by nearly a month (or 30 degrees). For example, the sign of Cancer mostly corresponds to the constellation Gemini.

Sidereal astrology does not divide the astrological signs equally along the ecliptic, unlike tropical astrology. But defines the signs based on the actual width of the individual constellations. Sidereal astrology also includes constellations that are disregarded by the traditional zodiac but are still in contact with the ecliptic.

For the purpose of determining the constellations in contact with the ecliptic, the constellation boundaries as defined by the International Astronomical Union in 1930 are used. For example, the Sun enters the IAU boundary of Aries on April 19 at the lower right corner, a position that is still rather closer to the "body" of Pisces, as the first sign rather than of Aries. The IAU defined the constellation boundaries without consideration of astrological purposes.

The dates the Sun passes through the 12 astronomical constellations of the ecliptic are listed below, accurate to the year 2011. The dates will progress by an increment of one day every 70.5 years. The corresponding tropical and sidereal dates are given as well.

Glyph	Constellation	Tropical zodiac dates	Sidereal zodiac dates (Lahiri ayanamsa)	Dates based on 14 equal length sign zodiac used by Schmidt (Note: Schmidt (1970) added a Sun sign for Cetus, falling between Aries and Taurus from May 12 – June 6, as well as the more often seen addition of Ophiuchus, q.v. (Note: Ophiuchus is not a sign in traditional forms of tropical and sidereal astrology, and only appears in a few forms of astrology which use the nominal constellation boundaries adopted by the IAU.). However, his symbols for Cetus and Ophiuchus are not the same as the symbols used here. Under the IAU constellation boundaries, the sign of Cetus corresponds to the half of Taurus mostly west of Aldebaran and the Hyades, while the Taurus sign corresponds to the half of Taurus east of Aldebaran and the Hyades.)	Based on IAU boundaries
	Aries	Mar 21 – Apr 19	Apr 14 – May 14	Apr 16 – May 11	Apr 18 – May 13
	Cetus	—N/a	—N/a	May 12 – Jun 6	—N/a (Note: While the ecliptic does not cross the boundary of Cetus, it comes within 9 arcminutes at its closest point, which means the edge of the Sun briefly enters this constellation around March 27–28.)
	Taurus	Apr 20 – May 20	May 15 – Jun 15	Jun 7 – Jul 2	May 13 – Jun 21
	Gemini	May 21 – Jun 20	Jun 16 – Jul 16	Jul 3 – Jul 28	Jun 21 – Jul 20
	Cancer	Jun 21 – Jul 22	Jul 17 – Aug 16	Jul 29 – Aug 23	Jul 20 – Aug 10
	Leo	Jul 23 – Aug 22	Aug 17 – Sep 16	Aug 24 – Sep 18	Aug 10 – Sep 16
	Virgo	Aug 23 – Sep 22	Sep 17 – Oct 16	Sep 19 – Oct 14	Sep 16 – Oct 30
	Libra	Sep 23 – Oct 22	Oct 17 – Nov 15	Oct 15 – Nov 9	Oct 30 – Nov 23
	Scorpio	Oct 23 – Nov 21	Nov 16 – Dec 15	Nov 10 – Dec 5	Nov 23 – Nov 29
	Ophiuchus	—N/a	—N/a	Dec 6 – Dec 31	Nov 29 – Dec 17
	Sagittarius	Nov 22– Dec 21	Dec 16 – Jan 14	Jan 1 – Jan 26	Dec 17 – Jan 20
	Capricorn	Dec 22 – Jan 19	Jan 15 – Feb 12	Jan 27 – Feb 21	Jan 20 – Feb 16
	Aquarius	Jan 20 – Feb 18	Feb 13 – Mar 14	Feb 22 – Mar 20	Feb 16 – Mar 11
	Pisces	Feb 19 – Mar 20	Mar 15 – Apr 13	Mar 21 – Apr 15	Mar 11 – Apr 18

== See also ==
- Great year
- Astrology and science
- Synoptical astrology
