= Great Year =

Length of time

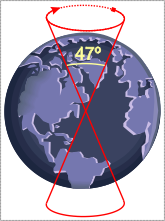
The tilt of the Earth's polar axis remains constant but describes a circular path in space during a period known as the Great Year.

The term Great Year has multiple meanings. In scientific astronomy, it refers to the time required for the equinoxes to complete one full cycle around the ecliptic, a period of approximately 25,800 years. According to Ptolemy, his teacher Hipparchus discovered this phenomenon by comparing the position of the vernal equinox against the fixed stars, noting that it shifts westward by about one degree every 72 years. This means that a full cycle through all the zodiac constellations takes roughly 25,920 years. In the heliocentric model, this precession can be visualized as the Earth’s rotational axis slowly tracing a circular path around the normal to the plane of the ecliptic. Currently, Earth's axis points close to Polaris, the North Star, but due to precession, this alignment is temporary and will shift over time, returning only after one complete Great Year has passed.

By extension, the term "Great Year" can be used for any concept of eternal return in the world's mythologies or philosophies. Historian Otto Neugebauer writes:

The difficulty with the term "great year" lies in its ambiguity. Almost any period can be found sometime or somewhere honored with this name.

== Description of the science ==
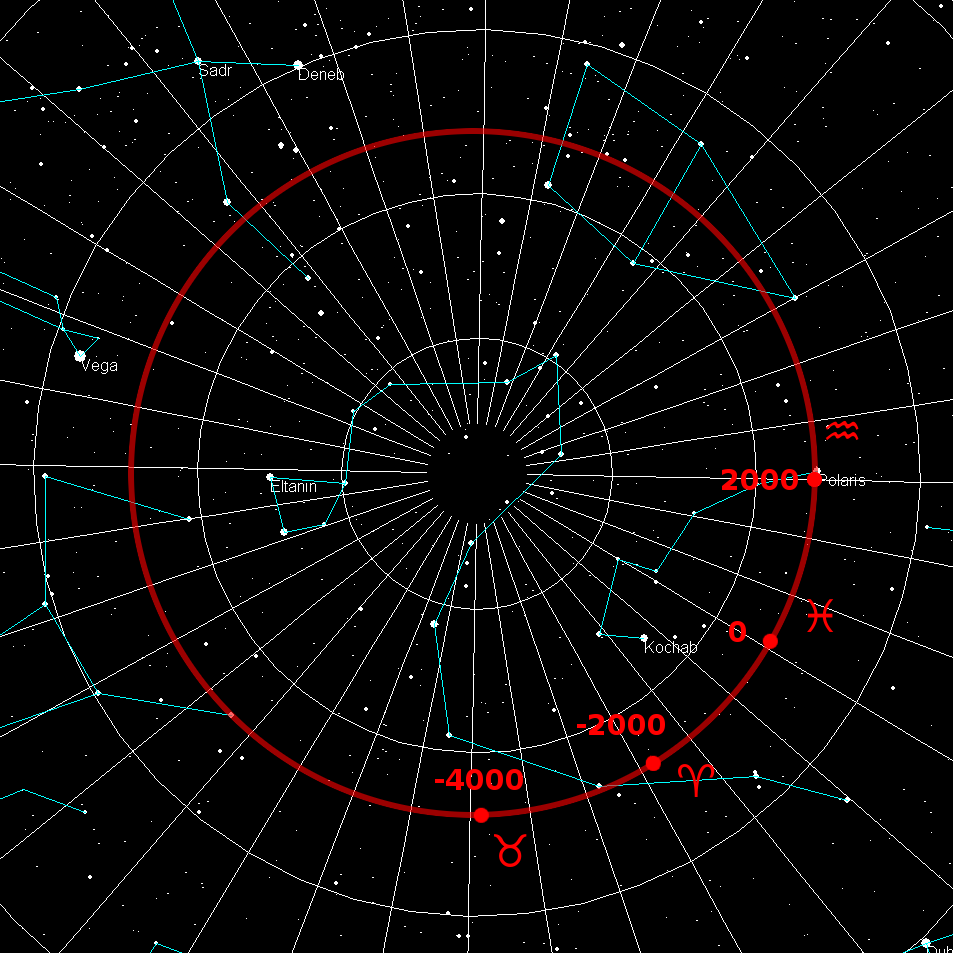
The path of the North Pole projected on the sky is a circle which takes 25,772 years to complete. The data in red show the polar point in past epochs and the constellation the vernal equinox was in at that time.

The plane of the ecliptic is the plane described by the apparent motion of the Sun against the starry background. It is the Earth's orbital motion about the Sun which causes this apparent motion to occur. The Earth's axis of rotation is not set perpendicular to this plane but at a present angle of 23.5 degrees to the perpendicular. The alignment of the axis is maintained throughout the year so that the point of sky above the north or south poles remains unchanged throughout the Earth's annual rotation around the Sun.

A slow conical motion of the Earth's polar axis about its normal to the plane of the ecliptic is caused by the attractive force of the other heavenly bodies on the equatorial protuberance of the Earth. A similar conical motion can also be observed in a gyroscope that is subjected to lateral forces.

The resultant motion of the Earth's axis is called general precession and the equinox points in the ecliptic move westward along the ecliptic at the rate of about 50.3 seconds of arc per year as a result. In 25,772 years, the points are once again at the same point in the sky where observations began.

In addition the tilt, or obliquity, of the Earth's axis is not constant but changes in a cycle of its own. During a cycle that averages about 40,000 years, the tilt of the axis varies between 22.1 and 24.5 degrees.

The precession of the axis of a spinning body as seen on a small scale in a gyroscope.

== History of both definitions ==
Plato (c. 360 BC) used the term "perfect year" to describe the return of the celestial bodies (planets) and the diurnal rotation of the fixed stars (circle of the Same) to their original positions; there is no evidence he had any knowledge of axial precession. The cycle which Plato describes is one of planetary and astral conjunction, which can be postulated without any awareness of axial precession.

Hipparchus (c. 120 BC) is the first Greek credited with discovering axial precession roughly two hundred years after Plato's death (see below).

Cicero (1st century BC) followed Plato in defining the Great Year as a combination of solar, lunar and planetary cycles.

Plato's description of the perfect year is found in his dialogue Timaeus:

And so people are all but ignorant of the fact that time really is the wanderings of these bodies, bewilderingly numerous as they are and astonishingly variegated. It is none the less possible, however, to discern that the perfect number of time brings to completion the perfect year at that moment when the relative speeds of all eight periods have been completed together and, measured by the circle of the Same that moves uniformly, have achieved their consummation."

In De Natura Deorum, Cicero wrote

On the diverse motions of the planets the mathematicians have based what they call the Great Year, "which is completed when the sun, moon and five planets having all finished their courses have returned to the same positions relative to one another. The length of this period is hotly debated, but it must necessarily be a fixed and definite time."

Macrobius (early fifth century AD) in his commentary on Cicero's Somnium Scipionis states that 'the philosophers' reckon the Great Year as 15,000 years.

Censorinus (3rd century AD) wrote that Aristarchus of Samos reckoned a Great Year as 2484 years: but it has been argued that this is a miscopying of 2434, which represents 45 Exeligmos cycles.

The origin of the Platonic Year would seem to have no connection with the precession of the equinoxes as this was unknown in Plato's time. Two centuries after Plato, Hipparchus is credited with discovering the period of equinox precession, and the term "Great Year" eventually came to be applied to the period of that precession caused by the slow gyration of the Earth's axis.

Some time around the middle of the second century BC, the astronomer Hipparchus discovered that the fixed stars as a whole gradually shifted their position in relation to the annually determined locations of the Sun at the equinoxes and solstices... Otto Neugebauer argued that Hipparchus in fact believed that this [36,000 years] was the maximum figure and that he also computed the true rate of one complete precession cycle at just under 26,000 years...

A confusion between the two definitions of the Great Year is believed to have originated with the astronomer Ptolemy (c. 170 AD), who adopted the larger, incorrect figure of 36,000 years. This led to the increasing conflation of the Platonic Great Year—based on planetary cycles—with the precessional Great Year, defined by the movement of the stars. Some scholars have even accused Ptolemy of scientific fraud, suggesting that he may have fabricated observations to support the 36,000-year cycle, despite having access to data that could have led him much closer to the correct figure of 26,000 years.

Josephus (first century AD) refers to a 'Great Year' (Ancient Greek: μέγας ἐνιαυτός) of 600 years.

God afforded them a longer time of life on account of their virtue, and the good use they made of it in astronomical and geometrical discoveries, which would not have afforded the time of foretelling [the periods of the stars] unless they had lived six hundred years; for the great year is completed in that interval.

It has been suggested that he obtained this value from Berossos (c. 3rd century BC) who reckoned time in intervals of 60, 600 and 3600 years.

Isaac Newton (1642 – 1726/27) determined the cause of precession and established the rate of precession at 1 degree per 72 years, very close to the best value measured today, thus demonstrating the magnitude of the error in the earlier value of 1 degree per century.

== Time scale when compared to other geological events and physical processes ==
The world's most recent volcanic supereruption, the Oruanui eruption of Taupō Volcano in New Zealand, occurred almost exactly one great year ago. The half-life of Plutonium-239, 24110 years, is a little bit less. After one great year, the interstellar space probe Voyager 1 is expected to have almost passed through the theorized Oort cloud.

== See also ==
- Astrological age – Time period in ancient historical and astrological theories of time
- Precession § Astronomy
- Yuga – Age or era in Hinduism
