= Ayanāṃśa =

System for the precession of equinoxes

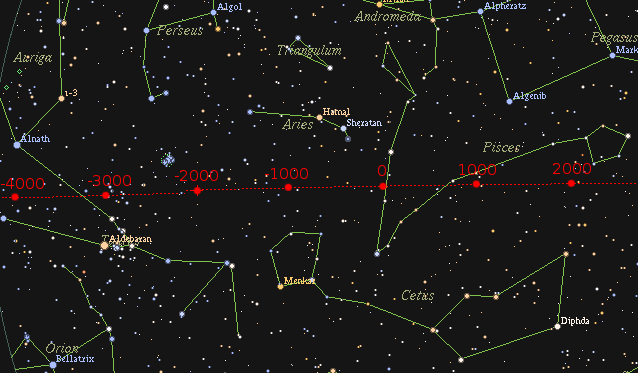
Path taken by the point of vernal equinox along the ecliptic over the past 6000 years

Ayanamsa (ayanāṃśa: from Sanskrit ayana 'movement' and aṃśa 'component'), also ayanabhāga (from Sanskrit bhāga 'portion'), is the Sanskrit term for many systems used in Hindu astrology to account for the precession of equinoxes. There are also systems of ayanamsa used in Western sidereal astrology, such as the Fagan/Bradley Ayanamsa.

== Overview ==
There are various systems of Ayanamsa that are in use in Hindu astrology (also known as Vedic astrology) such as the Raman Ayanamsa and the Krishnamurthy Ayanamsa, but the Lahiri Ayanamsa, named after its inventor, astronomer Nirmal Chandra Lahiri (1906–1980), is by far the most prevalent system in India. Critics of Lahiri Ayanamsa have proposed an ayanamsa called True Chitra Paksha Ayanamsa. There are other existing ayanamsa such as Raman, Pushya Paksha, Rohini, Kërr A.I, Usha Shashi and Chandra Hari. However, the zero ayanamsa year of Dulakara ayanamsa is precise; the zero ayanamsa year according to it is 232 CE. Indrasena ayanamsa is a significant improvement of Dulakara ayanamsa by introducing a different precessional rate, which is 50.30274802049371" per year, to 232 CE zero ayanamsa year.

The use of ayanamsa to account for the precession of equinoxes is believed to have been defined in Vedic texts at least 2,500 years before the Greek astronomer Hipparchus quantified the precession of equinoxes in 127 B.C. While critical scholars believe these "Vedic texts", at least those centering Spica Cittā (or 0° Libra, Tūla Rāśi), were composed in the common era, between 200 and 400 CE.

Lahiri falsely [unsubstantiated claim] intended that Spica be centred in Cittā (0° Tūla, tropical LIB) and exactly 180° from tropical ARI. Spica's ecliptic longitude was approximately 203.2° in the mid 1950s, 203.84° in 2000 and thus its presumed ayanamsa is 23.84° (J2000), 24.2° by 2026, and 25.0° by 2083.

The actual longitude of Spica is closer to 29° Virgo than 0° Libra. Thus, the Lahiri ayanamsa is nearly one degree less than the true value of ayanamsa.

Centring Spica in Cittā, as Lahiri does, pushes Aldebaran and Regulus off-centre and pushes Antares west and outside its namesake nakshatra. Allowing Spica 45' to 1° east of Cittā's center better aligns Pleiades in Kattikā, centers Aldebaran in Rohini, Regulus in Maghā, and Antares to define the western boundary of Jyestha.

== See also ==
- Western sidereal astrology
