= Astronomica (Manilius) =

1st-century AD Latin didactic poem about celestial phenomena

- by Marcus Manilius
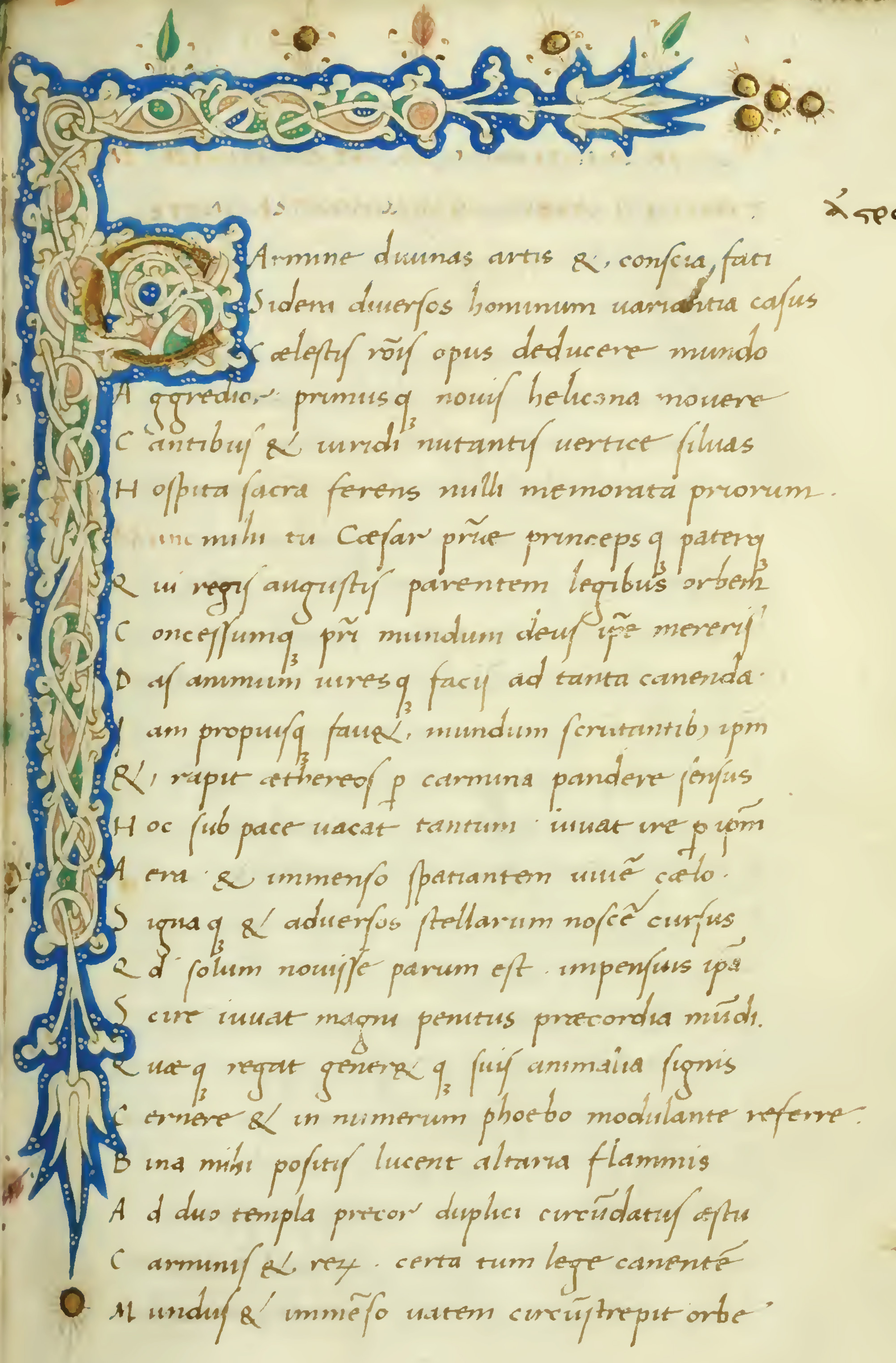
- The first page of the Astronomica, from a 1461 manuscript
- Translator: Thomas Creech; Edward Sherburne; G. P. Goold
- Written: c. AD 30–40
- Country: Roman Empire
- Language: Latin
- Subject(s): astronomy, astrology
- Genre: Didactic
- Meter: Hexameter
- Published in English: 1674/1697
- Media type: manuscript
- Lines: 4,200

The Astronomica (Classical Latin: [astrɔˈnɔmɪka]), also known as Astronomicon, is a Latin didactic poem about celestial phenomena, written in hexameters and divided into five books. The Astronomica was written c. AD 30–40 by a Roman poet whose name was likely Marcus Manilius; little is known of Manilius, and although there is evidence that the Astronomica was probably read by many other Roman writers, no surviving works explicitly quote him.

The earliest work on astrology that is extensive, comprehensible, and mostly intact, the Astronomica describes celestial phenomena, and, in particular, the zodiac and astrology. The poem—which seems to have been inspired by Lucretius's poem De rerum natura—espouses a Stoic, deterministic understanding of a universe overseen by a god and governed by reason. The fifth book contains a lacuna, which has led to debate about the original size of the poem; some scholars have argued that whole books have been lost over the years, whereas others believe only a small section of the work is missing.

The poem was rediscovered c. 1416–1417 by the Italian humanist and scholar Poggio Bracciolini, who had a copy made from which the modern text derives. Since its rediscovery, the Astronomica has been read, commented upon, and edited by a number of scholars, most notably Joseph Justus Scaliger, Richard Bentley, and A. E. Housman. The poem was never as popular as other classical Latin poems and was neglected for centuries after its rediscovery. This started to change during the early 20th century when Housman published his critically acclaimed edition of the poem in five books (1903–30). Housman's work was followed by G. P. Goold's lauded English translation in 1977. Today, scholars consider the Astronomica to be highly technical, complicated, and occasionally contradictory. At the same time, many have praised Manilius's ability to translate heady astronomical concepts and complex mathematical computations into poetry.

== Authorship and date ==
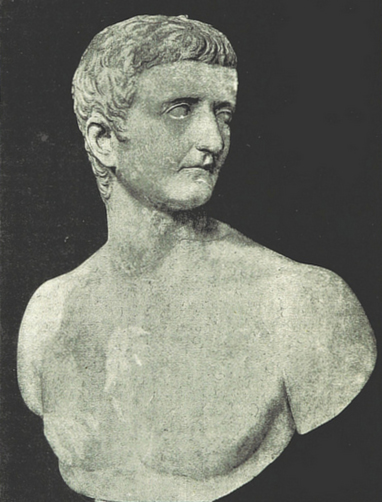
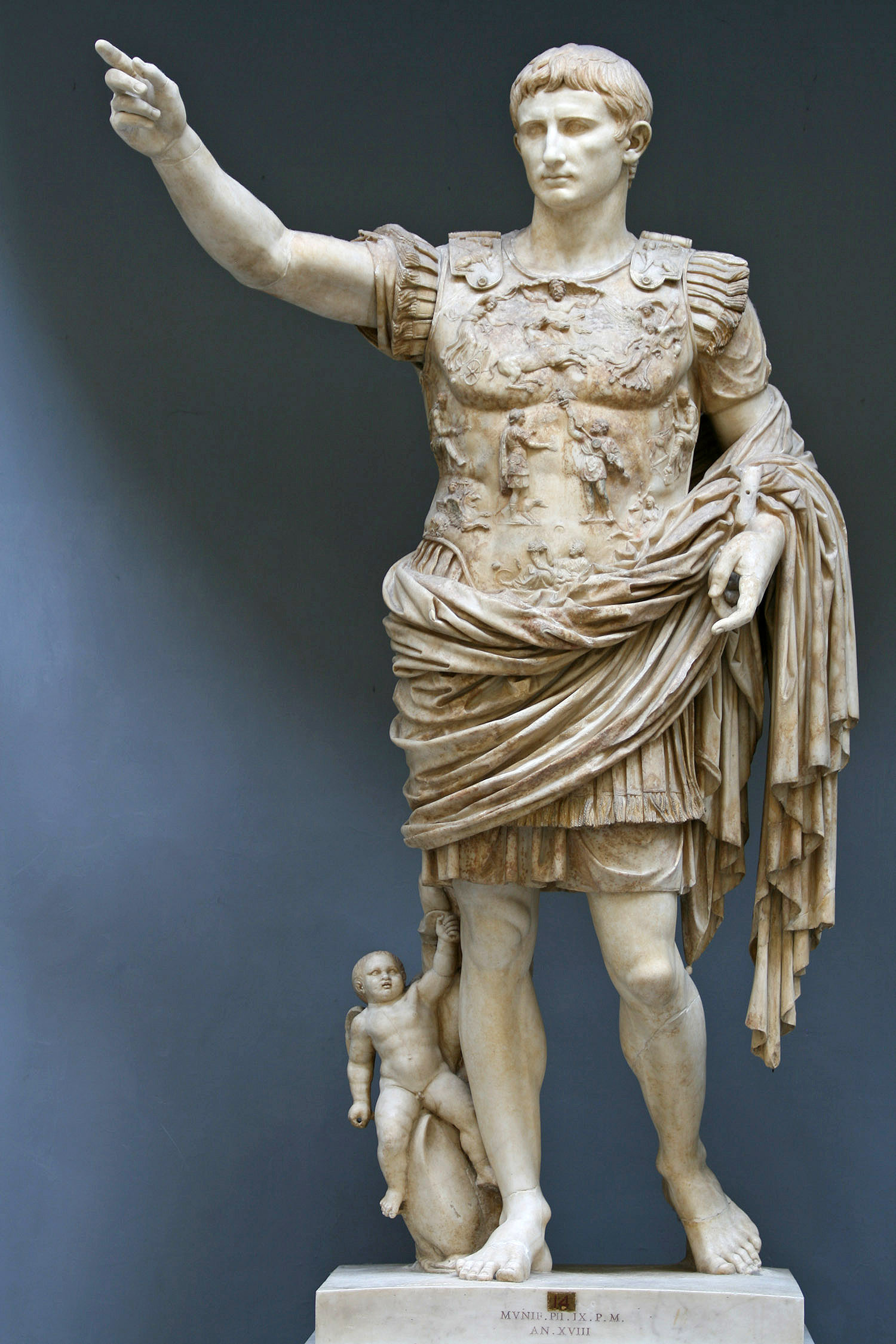
Scholars have debated whether the "Caesar" referred to in the poem is Tiberius (left) or Augustus (right).

Because no contemporary Roman sources mention his name, the exact identity of the Astronomica's author is a tantalizing question, but his name was probably Marcus Manilius. (Note: In the manuscript of the poem known as M, the author is identified three times in the genitive, as "M[arcus]. Manili", "M. Manlii", and "M. Milnili"; "Manlii" and "Milnili" are likely both corruptions of the nomen "Manlii", making the author's name "Marcus Manlius" ("Marci Manlii" in the genitive).) This uncertainty has led to Marcus Manilius being confused over the years with Manilius Antiochus (fl. c. 100 BC, mentioned by Pliny the Elder in his Naturalis Historia); Flavius Manlius Theodorus (fl. c. AD 376–409, a consul in AD 399) and Boëthius (the sixth-century Roman senator and author of De consolatione philosophiae, whose full name was Anicius Manlius Severinus Boëthius). Although the poem suggests that the writer was a citizen and resident of Rome, some have contended that Manilius was a non-Roman; according to Katharina Volk, a Latinist who specializes in Manilius, this belief is generally based on either "the poet's supposedly inferior Latinity" or "the wish to see Manilius as the member of a Greek intellectual milieu at Rome". The 19th-century classicist Fridericus Jacobs and the 19th- and 20th-century historian Paul Monceaux have argued that he was an African, based largely on his writing style, which they say resembles that of African authors. Volk counters this view, arguing that Manilius writes "from ... a conventional Roman perspective" and "takes recourse to Roman history to illustrate the astrological facts he discusses".

The work's date has been debated. The only historical event to which there is a clear reference is the Battle of the Teutoburg Forest—a decisive loss for Rome that forced the empire to withdraw from Magna Germania—in AD 9. In considering the poem's date, scholars have proposed three hypotheses: that it was written entirely under Augustus (who ruled from 27 BC until AD 14), under the reigns of both Augustus and Tiberius (who ruled from AD 14–37), or entirely under Tiberius. The first conjecture was favored primarily from the Renaissance until the 19th century, when Karl Lachmann argued that references to the emperor in the poem made more sense if they were referring to Tiberius. At the turn of the 20th century, scholars such as A. E. Housman began favoring the idea that the first two books were written under Augustus, the last two under Tiberius, and that the third was "undatable". (Note: This is based on the facts that the first book mentions the Battle of the Teutoburg Forest (suggesting an Augustan date), the second claims that Capricorn is the Emperor's natal sign (indicating this book was written under Augustus), and the fourth describes Libra as the natal sign of the leader (suggesting that this book was written under Tiberius). Books three and five are difficult to date, but book five is assumed to have been written under Tiberius because it followed the (Tiberian) book four.) This debate has not been settled, although Volk has argued that the poem should be dated to c. AD 10–20.

== Contents ==
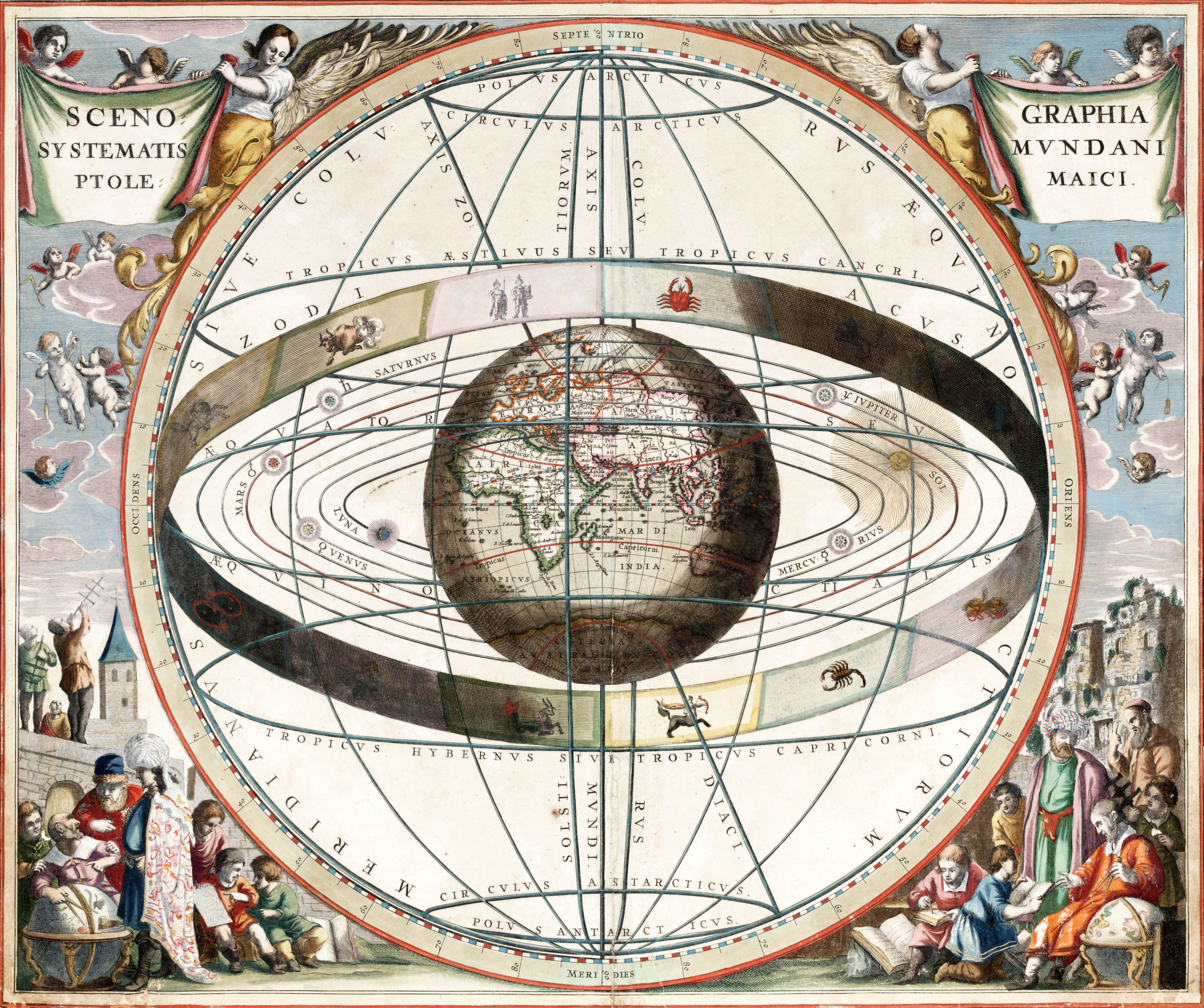
The universe, as described by Manilius, is made up of two spheres: one solid (Earth) and the other hollow (the firmament), resembling this 17th-century depiction in Andreas Cellarius's Harmonia Macrocosmica.

According to Volk, Manilius's Astronomica is the earliest work on astrology that is extensive, comprehensible, and mostly extant. Volk wrote that since he dedicates the poem to stellar phenomena, it is "indicative of the great fascination ... that the stars held for the Romans of Manilius' period".

=== Summary ===
The Astronomica, which is written in hexameters, opens with Manilius contending that he is the "first to sing of astrology". He also claims that the god Mercury engendered his interest in celestial bodies.

In the first book he ponders the origin of the universe, considering the theories of Xenophanes, Hesiod, Leucippus, Heraclitus, Thales, and Empedocles before arguing that the universe was created from the four elements and is governed by a divine spirit. According to Manilius, the universe is composed of two spheres: one (the Earth) is solid and the other (the "sphere of stars", often called the firmament) is hollow. The constellations are fixed in the firmament; the Earth is stationary and the firmament revolves around it, explaining the movements of the stars. The planets, the Moon, and the Sun also revolve around the Earth in the vast space between its surface and the edge of the firmament. Because the Earth is in the center of the universe, it is equidistant from the firmament and is thus not compelled to "fall" in any specific direction. According to Manilius, the universe is ruled by a god (conspirat deus) and is governed by reason (ratione gubernat). (Note: Volk writes that Manilius is unclear as to how the deity, the universe, and reason are all connected to one another. Manilius occasionally treats these key terms as distinct concepts and at other times like synonyms for one another, further complicating the meaning of their use.) Manilius next discusses the constellations and stars and the celestial circles. In this section, the poet spends considerable time contemplating the Milky Way band, which, after exploring several hypotheses as to its existence, (Note: Including that the Milky Way band is: the place in the sky where the two hemispheres are merging or diverging; a path the Sun once took; the route Phaethon took when he drove Helios's sun chariot; milk from Juno's breast; or a cluster of small stars.) he concludes is likely to be the celestial abode for dead heroes. The first book ends with an exploration of comets, which Manilius sees as harbingers of calamity or great disaster.

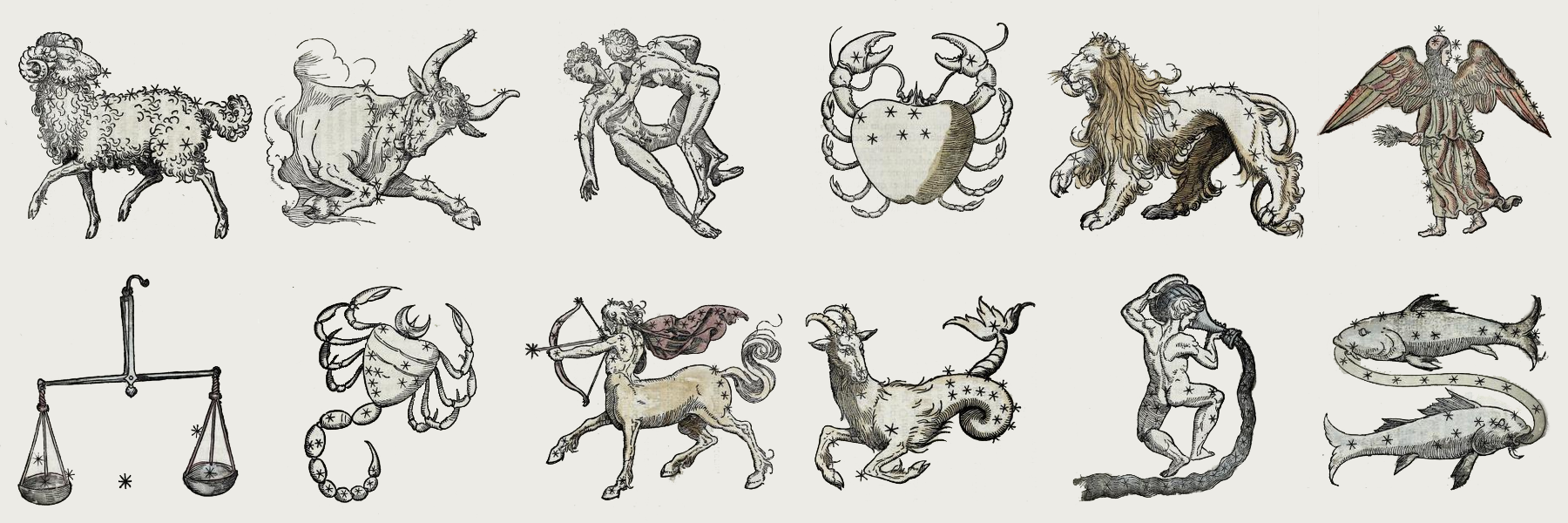
Book three discusses the signs of the zodiac, which are depicted in this 16th-century manuscript.

Books two and three deal mainly with the finer details of the zodiac. Book two opens with a preface in which Manilius presents a brief history of hexameter poetry, singling out Homer and Hesiod. The purpose, Volk argues, is to emphasize the uniqueness of his poem in comparison to others rather than to insert himself into this poetic tradition. According to Manilius, "Every path that leads to Helicon has been trodden" (omnis ad accessus Heliconos semita trita est; all other topics have been covered) and he must find "untouched meadows and water" (integra ... prata ... undamque) for his poetry: astrology. Manilius ends the book's preface by saying "that the divine cosmos is voluntarily revealing itself both to mankind as a whole and to the poet in particular", and that he is set apart from the crowd because his poetic mission has been sanctioned by fate. The poet then begins his explanation of the first astrologically significant circle: the zodiac itself. (Note: The Zodiac: "an imagined band on the sphere of fixed stars 23.5 degree angle to the celestial equator, which forms the backdrop of the seven planets' orbits around the earth.") He first considers the signs of the zodiac (viz. Aries, Taurus, Gemini, Cancer, Leo, Virgo, Libra, Scorpio, Sagittarius, Capricorn, Aquarius, and Pisces), before discussing the aspects and relationships between the signs and other objects. In this section, the poet briefly discusses the zodiac signs, the Olympian gods who serve as their protectors, and the relationship between the signs and the parts of the human body. The Astronomica then considers dodecatemoria (Note: Dodecatemoria: the division of each zodiacal sign into twelve segments.) before he deviates from the zodiac and begins to discuss the didactic method. The book concludes with a consideration of the second astrologically significant circle, that of the fixed circle of the observer. (Note: Fixed circle of the observer: the "imagined circle around the observer, defined by the four cardinal points, through which the zodiac and the planets turn".) The last few lines are dedicated to an overview of the dodecatropos. (Note: Dodecatropos: "'(System of) twelve units': the division of the fixed circle of the observer into twelve places [i.e. houses] ... each of which governs a particular aspect of life.")

The third book – which focuses mainly on "determin[ing] the degree of the ecliptic which is rising about the horizon at the moment" of a person's birth – opens with Manilius's reiteration that his work is original. Because his topic is complex and difficult, the poet tells his audience they can "expect truth but not beauty". He then discusses the third astrologically significant circle, the lots, (Note: Lots: "Points on the birth chart that carry special significance. In Manilius['s poem], the lots ... are 30° divisions of the zodiac, whose position on the zodiac change with time according to the position of the [Sun and Moon].") which are points on a birth chart (Note: Birth chart: the specific arrangement of celestial bodies that occur the moment that a person is born. The terms "nativity" and "horoscope" are sometimes used in place of "birth chart".) that carry special significance. Subsequent verses explain how to calculate the ascendant, (Note: Ascendant: the "point of the zodiac that is rising over the horizon in the east". It is also sometimes called the horoscopus.) the horoscope, (Note: At lines 218–24, Manilius describes a "vulgar" method for calculating the ascendant, which—according to Pierre Brind'Amour—he calls a "dubious computation" (dubia ... ratione). In lines 225–482 feature Manilius objects to the vulgar method, explaining "how latitude affects the length of the days in the various seasons and the rising time of the signs", provides a proper scheme to calculate the ascendant, and explains "a method by which the length of the days throughout the year can be computed for any specific location". Starting at line 483 and ending at line 509, "something very peculiar happens. The poet suddenly announces another method for computing the Ascendant, and what he proceeds to expound ... is exactly the same vulgar method which he had previously described and condemned." Some scholars, like A. E. Housman, G. P. Goold, and Auguste Bouché-Leclercq say Manilius simply made an error, whereas Pierre Brind'Amour says lines 483–509 are spurious.) and chronocrators; (Note: Chronocrators: the "celestial features ... that govern individual sections of a person's life".) and how to determine the projected length of one's life. The third book concludes with a discussion about the tropic signs, (Note: Tropic signs: Cancer, Capricorn, Aries and Libra; they "house the solstices and equinoxes". They are called "tropic signs" because "they (or at any rate Cancer and Capricorn) constitute the turning points of the sun's annual course".) which, while not particularly pertinent to the astrological content of the book, allows Manilius to end the book on a "poetic note". Most scholars consider the third book to be highly technical; according to Goold it "is the least poetical of the five, exemplifying for the most part Manilius's skill in rendering numbers and arithmetical calculations in hexameters". A similar but less favorable sentiment is expressed by Green, who writes that in this book, "the disjuncture between instruction and medium is most obviously felt [because] complex mathematical calculations are confined to hexameter and obscured behind poetic periphrasis".

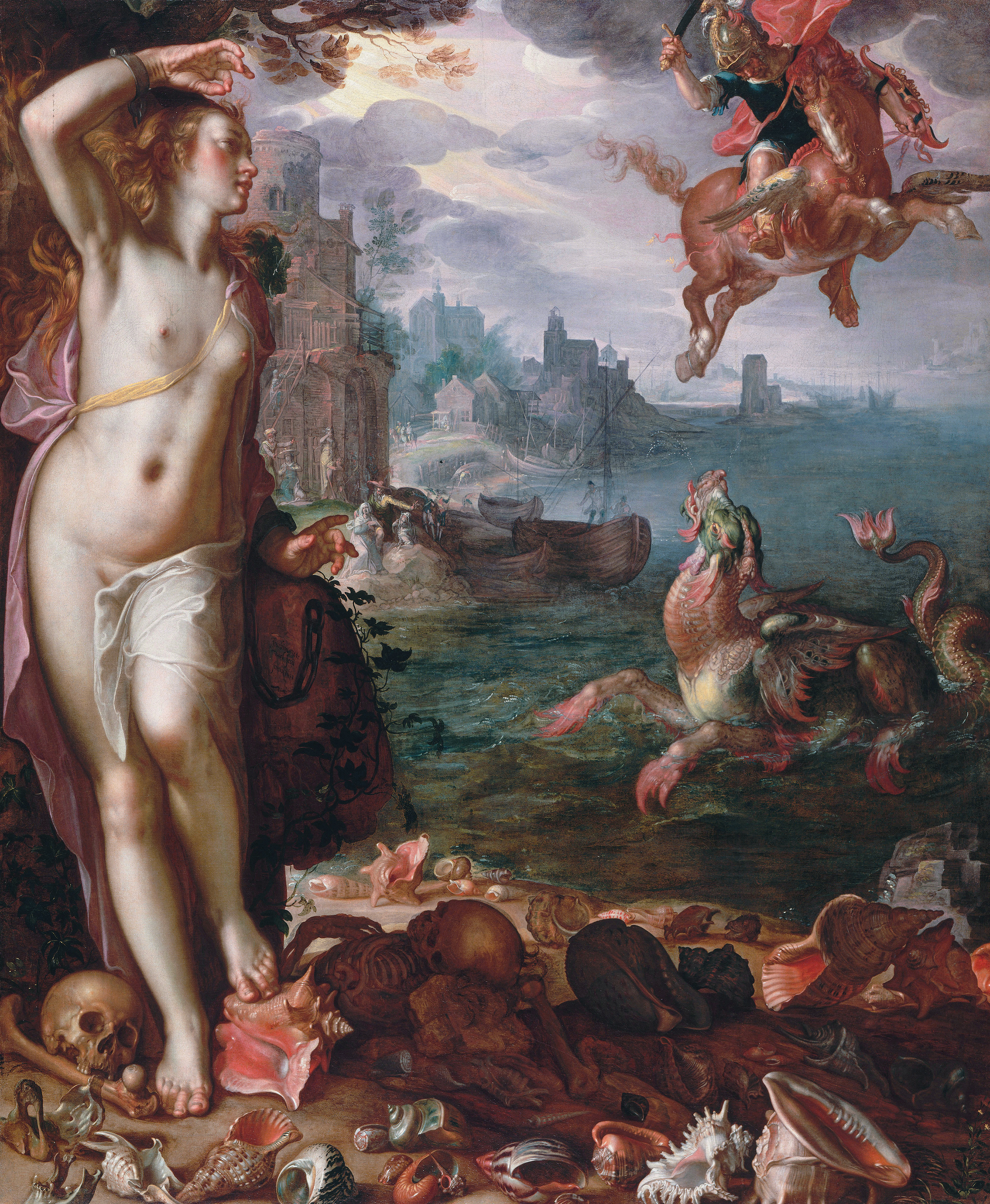
Most of the work's fifth book deals with the myth of Andromeda (left), Perseus (upper right), and a sea monster (lower right).

Books four and five are largely about "the effects of particular celestial phenomena on the native". Book four covers many topics that originated in Egypt, leading Goold to write that Manilius based his work on an Egyptian source. Much of the first portion of this book deals with decans (Note: Decans: divisions of the zodiac that measure ten degrees; each zodiac sign is composed of and governs three decans.) and the partes damnandae, (Note: Partes damnandae: Latin for the "degrees to be rejected"; this phrase represents certain degrees of the zodiac signs that are considered harmful or bad.) both of which allow Manilius another chance to convert mathematical and astrological tables into verse. A short description of the rising of individual zodiacal degrees is followed by a more comprehensive survey of zodiacal geography. (Note: Zodiacal geography: the allotment of specific countries, regions, or division of lands to the rule of specific zodiac signs.) Near the end of the book, Manilius writes about the ecliptic signs. (Note: Ecliptic signs: signs of the zodiac in which either the sun or the moon is to be found during an eclipse.) The book is punctuated at lines 4.387–407 and 4.866–935 by "exhortation[s] of the frustrated student", where complaints that astrology is difficult and nature is hidden are countered by statements that "the object of study is nothing less than (union with) god" and "the universe (microcosm) wishes to reveal itself to man".

Most of the fifth (and final) book is a discussion of paranatellonta (Note: Paranatellonta: "constellations, parts thereof ... or especially bright individual stars, which become visible or invisible at the same time as certain degrees or decanal sections ... of the ecliptic".) via the myth of Andromeda and Perseus. Manilius recalls how Andromeda was chosen to be sacrificed to a sea monster by her parents; Cepheus and Cassiopeia. Andromeda was chained to a cliff but before the creature could consume her, Perseus (who had just vanquished Medusa) arrived. He instantly fell in love with Andromeda, killed the sea monster, and saved the young woman's life. According to Green, the digression, which is by far the longest in the poem, "is very well chosen, in as much as no other mythological episode involves so many future constellations interacting at the same time; Andromeda (e.g. 5.544), Perseus (e.g. 5.67), the Sea Monster – strictly, Cetus (cf. 5.600), but often referred to in more generic terms during this story as belua (5.544, 608) and monstrum (5.581)—Medusa's head (e.g. 5.567), and Andromeda's parents, Cepheus and Cassiopeia". Green says the story is perfect for Manilius; he is able to use it to justify the constellations' proximity to one another and their eternal arrangement, as he had previously argued in 1.354–360. Conversely, Housman compared it unfavorably to Ovid's version of the story and called Manilius's retelling "a sewn-on patch of far from the best purple" (purpurae non sane splendidissimae adsutus pannus). A similar sentiment was expressed by the Cambridge classicist Arthur Woollgar Verrall, who wrote that while the episode was meant to be a "show piece", it comes across as "a poor mixture of childish rhetoric and utter commonplace". Between lines 5.709–10, there is a large lacuna, meaning that at least some of the work is missing, and then the last few lines of the book concern stars and other stellar phenomena. The book ends with a simile about the "res publica of stars". This section – in which Manilius proposes that the stars constitute an elaborate and organized system, defined by a hierarchy that prevents "cosmic disaster" – seems to Volk to be a way for Manilius to assert the legitimacy of the Roman state through analogy.

=== Genre ===
Though, as explained by Katharina Volk, "in histories of Latin literature, Manilius is typically treated under the rubric of didactic poetry", there has been much debate as to whether the Astronomica should be categorized as an "epic poem" or as a "didactic poem". Several sources refer to this work simply as an epic; for instance, Alison Keith writes in her book A Latin Epic Reader: Selections from Ten Epics, that "Manilius is the earliest exponent of imperial epic with his Astronomica", and Anthony Grafton, Glenn W. Most, and Salvatore Settis note in The Classical Tradition that "the earliest complete astrological text we possess from antiquity is Manilius's Latin epic the Astronomica (ca. 25 CE)". Other sources simply refer to the Astronomica as a "didactic poem", such as the Loeb Classical Library webpage for G. P. Goold's 1977 translation. According to Victoria Moul, "there is very little acknowledgement in either ancient or early modern criticism of didactic as a genre of its own, rather than a form of epic". Volk likewise writes that "didactic poems [e.g. De natura rerum and Astronomica] ... were often regarded as (some kind of) epic poetry". At the same time, Volk stresses that "there are ... such crucial differences between didactic poetry and narrative epic that it makes sense to consider the former a genre in its own right."

=== Worldview ===
According to Volk, "The basic tenet of what we might call Manilius' natural philosophy is the idea that the universe is divine". She writes that Manilius is inconsistent about the location of this divinity. For instance, in his first book, Manilius claims the perfectly regular movement of the sun, moon, planets, and stars is proof that the universe is the product of a god; he also says the universe itself is a god (mundum ... ipsum esse deum). Later in the same book, Manilius again says the universe is the "work of a great divinity" (magni ... numinis ordo). Concerning this vacillation, Volk writes; "It is clear that there is a certain elasticity to Manilius' concept of the divinity of the universe ... Is the world simply ruled by a diuinum numen (cf. 1.484) or is it a deus (cf 1.485) itself?" Volk answers that in the cosmology of the Astronomica, "God can be understood as the soul or breath ... present within the world [and] since this divine entity completely pervades the cosmos, it makes equally much sense to call the cosmos itself a god". According to Volk, this interpretation of the universe, which states that it has a sense of intellect and that it operates in an orderly way, thus allows Manilius to contend both that there is an unbroken chain of cause and effect affecting everything within the cosmos and that fate rules all.

Volk points out the poem borrows or alludes to a number of philosophical traditions, including Hermeticism, Platonism, and Pythagoreanism but the prevailing belief of commentators is that Manilius espouses a Stoic worldview in the Astronomica. A comparison between Manilius's beliefs and those of other Stoics reveals parallels that according to Volk "are immediately obvious". For instance, Stoics and Manilius agree on the divinity of the universe, the argument from design, the assumption that the supreme god is both the creator of the universe and the active force within it, the interconnectedness of everything, the understanding that humans are intimately connected to the cosmos, the importance of considering the heavens, and the belief in an inescapable fate that rules over all. The agreement on this latter point is of special importance because, according to Volk, belief in fate is "one of the most notorious aspects of the Stoic system".

The identification of the poem as Stoic, however, is not unanimous. In 1887, against the common opinion of contemporaneous scholars, Gustave Lanson contested the idea that the poem is Stoic. In 2005, Alexander MacGregor said that while contemporary scholars such as Goold and Volk read Manilius as a Stoic, the Astronomica actually breaks with or contradicts Stoic tradition in a number of places. Manilius exalts Plato, Socrates, and Pythagoras; proposes a Platonic proof for the existence of God, denies the ekpyrosis (a key Stoic belief in the periodic destruction of the cosmos by an immense conflagration every Great Year followed by a cosmic recreation), never discusses the six Stoic paradoxes, and ignores the importance of controlling the soul. Manilius also focuses on a number of Pythagorean tenets; the Pythagorean order of the planets, the importance of geometry and numbers, and the significance of tetraktys (triangular figures made up of ten points arranged in four rows). In key places, Manilius also makes use of non-Stoics like Eudoxus of Cnidus and Cicero. Given these factors, MacGregor concludes that Manilius should be classified as an idealistic Pythagorean or a Platonist rather than a Stoic.

=== Style ===
Many consider the Astronomica to be a work of erudition, elegance, and passion. Scaliger and Bentley praised Manilius's handling of numbers in verse, and the Harvard University Press later echoed this commendation, writing that he "exhibit[s] great virtuosity in rendering mathematical tables and diagrams in verse form", and that the poet "writes with some passion about his Stoic beliefs and shows much wit and humour in his character sketches of persons born under particular stars". Housman calls him "facile and frivolous" but also describes him as "the one Latin poet who excelled even Ovid in verbal point and smartness". The poem, while metrically correct, has been noted for its technical language and unusual word choices. The classicist Arthur Woollgar Verrall says that while "at his best, Manilius may remind us of Lucretius", the "metre [that he uses] has the regular and monotonous flow of the age". Jacobs, Monceaux, and others have attributed the Astronomica's idiosyncrasies to Manilius's reported African origin; they suggest he wrote and spoke a form of Africitas – a putative African dialect of Latin "with strongly marked peculiarities of vocabulary, syntax, sentence-structure, and style" – thus explaining the poem's quirks. Aside from the dubiously hypothesized presence of Africitas in the poem, however, M. Dorothy Brock argues there is very little evidence that Manilius was from Africa.

In addition to its stylistic oddities, the Astronomica includes inconsistencies. According to Green, it is "riddled with confusion and contradiction"; he cites its "presentation of incompatible systems of astrological calculation, information overload, deferral of meaning and contradictory instruction". At the same time, Green notes that similar issues exist in other first-to-third-century astrological works. According to Caroline Stark, Manilius paradoxically claims astrological knowledge may be acquired by individuals and that it is only granted by divine favor. T. Barton says Manilius may have included these contradictions and complexities so he would be regarded as "a figure of unreachable knowledge for the novice student-reader". Green, while not ruling out this hypothesis, says Manilius was probably not motivated by a "desire to carve out for himself a position of power in the new imperial world of experts" as Barton says. Rather, Green says Manilius – due to his "pride in poetic innovation" and his "deference ... to the Emperor" – sought to present "himself as a compliant imperial agent, intent on producing a creative poetic enterprise that plots its own way through the levels of acceptable stellar discourse in the early empire". David Pingree concludes that the poem's "principal purpose seems to have been to delight its audience with poetry and to arouse admiration for the poet by its cleverness".

=== Completeness ===
It is unknown whether the Astronomica is a finished work; a large lacuna between lines 5.709 and 5.710 presents a problem with this discussion. According to Housman, based strictly on the contents of the Astronomica, one cannot cast a full horoscope because necessary information – such as an in-depth survey of the planets and the effects constellations both inside and outside the zodiac produce upon their setting – is missing. According to Volk, the lack of a lengthy consideration of the planets is rather puzzling because Manilius claims several times that he will examine their zodiacal nature. Goold writes that "a didactic poem is seldom an exhaustive treatise" and argues that Manilius likely gave a "perfunctory account of the planets' natures in the great lacuna [and then] considered his obligations duly discharged".

Others have argued the work was originally longer and some hypothesize it comprised eight books. These writers base their assertion on a letter sent in AD 983 by Gerbertus Aureliacensis (later Pope Sylvester II) to the Archbishop of Rheims, in which the former reports he had recently located "eight volumes about astrology by Boethius" (viii volumina Boetii de astrologia) at the abbey at Bobbio. Boethius was often confused with Manilius because one of the former's names was "Manlius". Those who favor the idea the poem was once longer argue the manuscript at Bobbio was a misattributed eight-book version of the Astronomica. Goold repudiates this hypothesis, noting the catalogue at Bobbio lists the work Gerbertus was likely referring to as composed of "three books by Boethius about arithmetic, and the rest [i.e. five] about astronomy" (libros Boetii iii de aritmetica [sic] et alterum de astronomia). This, according to Goold, is evidence Gerbertus found one manuscript that contained both Boethius's De arithmetica and Manilius's Astronomica rather than an eight-book version of the latter.

Volk, when considering the problem of completeness, proposed several hypotheses: the work is mostly complete but internally inconsistent about which topics it will and will not consider; the lacuna in book five may have originally contained the missing information; the lacuna may be relatively small and the work is unfinished; or entire books may have originally existed but were lost over time through the "hazardous process of textual transmission".

== Influences ==
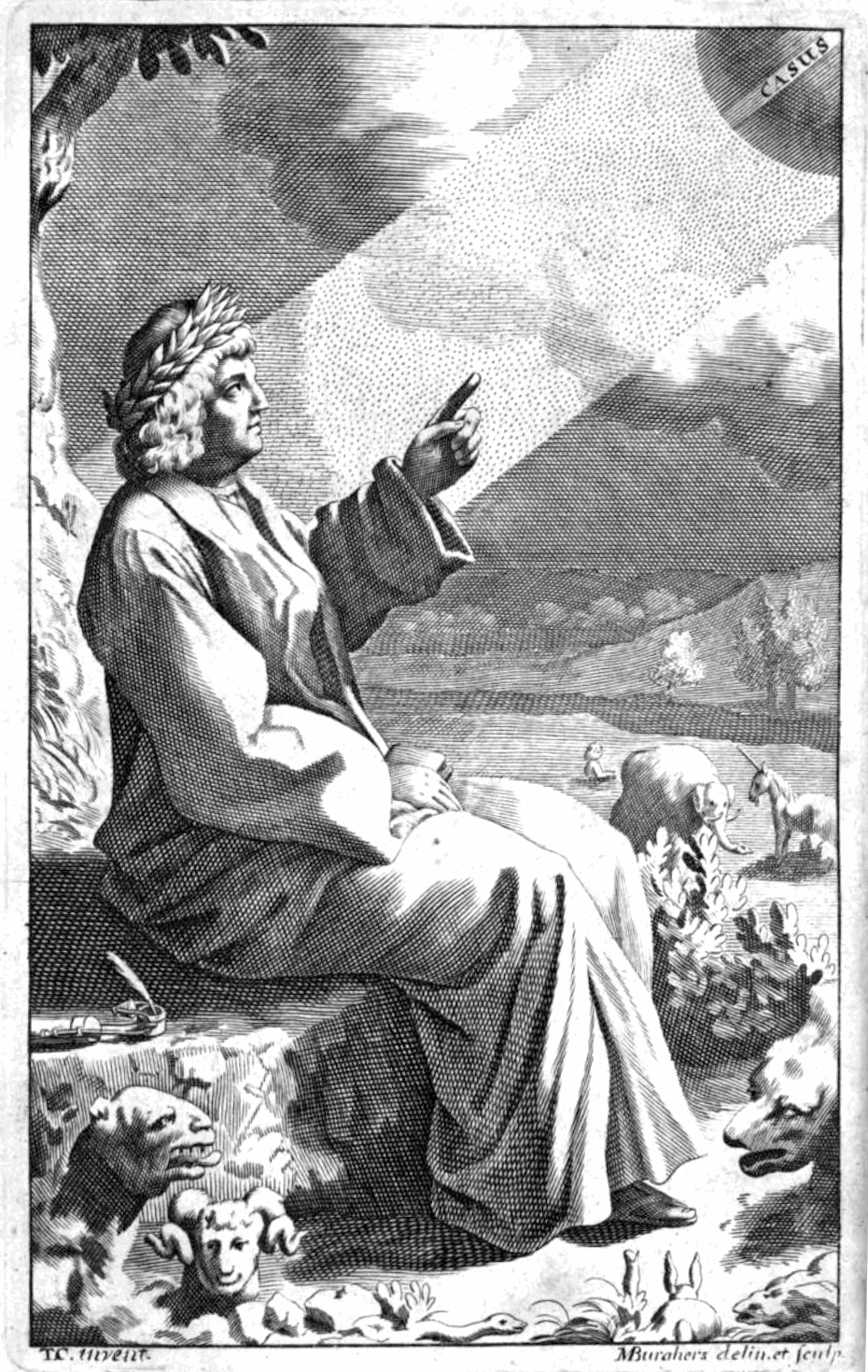
Although it was inspired by the Epicurean poem De rerum natura by Lucretius (pictured), the Astronomica embraces Stoicism.

Manilius frequently imitates Lucretius, who wrote the didactic poem De rerum natura. Some classicists have suggested that Manilius may have sought to emulate Lucretius by writing six books, but evidence for this hypothesis is scarce, and it remains mostly speculative. While Lucretius's work espouses Epicureanism (a philosophy that emphasizes materialism and skepticism of superstition and divine intervention), Manilius's work is largely Stoic, and promotes a Greco-Roman understanding of creationism as well as fatalistic determinism. Both Volk and the Lucretian scholar David Butterfield have argued that Manilius is in many ways, an "anti-Lucretius", with the former arguing that "his presentation in the Astronomica of an orderly cosmos ruled by fate is a direct attack on the random universe depicted by his predecessor". Manilius sometimes conveys his philosophical stance via grammatical voice: unlike Lucretius, who often uses a passive construction to convey his understanding of nature, Manilius uses active grammatical constructions to convey the intentionality he sees in creation (e.g. "God and reason, which rules all things, guide earthly animals by heavenly signs", deus et ratio quae cuncta gubernat ducit ab aeternis terrena animalia signis). Furthermore, while Lucretius used De rerum natura to present a non-theistic account of creation, Manilius "was a creationist rather than a materialistic evolutionist", and he consequently refers to "one spirit" (unus spiritus, 2.64), a "divine power" (divina potentia, 3.90), a "creator" (auctor, 3.681), and a "god" (deus, 2.475) throughout his poem.

The Astronomica is influenced by Ovid's Metamorphoses, Virgil's Aeneid, Ennius's Annales, and the Greek didactic poet Aratus. Aratus's influence s especially noticeable, and it seems likely that Manilius based much of his first book on portions of Aratus's Phaenomena. Despite his debt to Aratus, Manilius diverges from his understanding of the cosmos; Aratus focuses on mythology and "graphic description", whereas Manilius emphasizes the scientific aspects of his work. It is uncertain if Manilius had direct knowledge of Aratus's poem or if he used a translation by Cicero, Ovid, or Germanicus. The latter position is favored by several 21st-century scholars, such as Dora Liuzzi and Emma Gee. In regards to the poet's relationship with Germanicus, Wolfgang Hübner writes: "The few echoes of Germanicus' translation of Aratus are insufficient for us to establish which of the two drew on the other, or whether the two were composed independently of each other."

The Astronomica directly refers to Homer (as the "greatest poet", maximus vates) as well as Hesiod (calling him "nearest to [Homer]", proximus illi), and alludes to numerous other Greek poets and writers such as Apollonius Rhodius, Choerilus of Iasus, Choerilus of Samos, and Aeschylus. The poem also contains a direct allusion to Ennius's Annales, which, according to Goold, is the Astronomica's "one solitary notice of Latin literature."

== Textual history ==
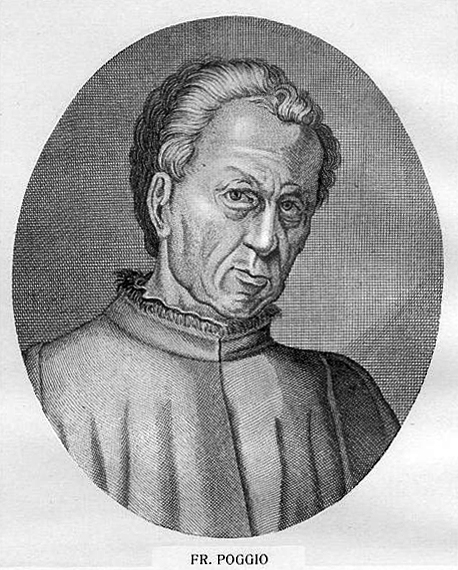
The Astronomica was rediscovered by Poggio Bracciolini c. 1416–17.

Although there are over thirty existing manuscript copies of the Astronomica, the text as it is known today is derived from three key manuscripts: Codex Gemblacensis (G), Codex Lipsiensis (L), and Codex Matritensis (M). (Note: In 1903, Housman said that the modern version of the Astronomica depended on four manuscripts: G, L, M, and V. He originally proposed that V—much like M—was a descendant of manuscript β (the manuscript first discovered by the Italian humanist and scholar Poggio Bracciolini in the early fifteenth century), but in 1930 he redacted this hypothesis, calling V instead one of the many "scions of M".) These in turn belong to two separate manuscript families: "α" (which includes G and L), and "β" (which includes M). Of the two families, Robinson Ellis wrote: "[α] represents a text more correct, but worse interpolated; [β], a text which is fuller of copyists' errors, but less interpolated."

The first family, "α", takes its name from a now-lost source and includes manuscripts G and L. G, dating from the late 10th to the 11th century, was found at the monastery of Gembloux in Brabant, in modern-day Belgium; L, from the library of Leipzig, was probably written around the mid-11th century and has many corrections made by a scribe. Housman argues that L is the superior of the two, as it was probably copied straight from α, whereas G was probably derived from a copy of a copy.

The second family, "β", takes its name from the now-lost archetype that Poggio Bracciolini rediscovered near Konstanz during a break in the Council of Constance c. 1416–17. Included in this family is manuscript M, which was copied from the archetype by a German amanuensis on Bracciolini's request. However, due to the scribe's incompetence, (Note: Bracciolini wrote that the scribe was ignorantissimus omnium viventium ("the most ignorant thing alive").) manuscript M was riddled with mistakes, prompting Bracciolini to sarcastically remark that the new copy had to be "divined rather than read" (divinare oportet non legere). Although poorly written, M has been singled out as possibly the most important surviving manuscript, because it was a direct copy of the archetype (β), whereas G and L are derived from a less "faithful" copy (that is, α) of that archetype.

Following the invention of the printing press, the editio princeps of the Astronomica was published in Nuremberg around 1473 by the astronomer Regiomontanus from an error-riddled Italian copy. The text was critically edited by Joseph Justus Scaliger, whose first edition was published in Paris in 1579; a second and improved edition, collated at least partially from the Codex Gemblacensis, was published in Leiden in 1599–1600, and a third edition was published in 1655 after Scaliger's death by Johann Heinrich Boeckler. An edition with many corrections was published by Richard Bentley in 1739. Then, in five volumes between 1903 and 1930, Housman published what is considered by many scholars the authoritative edition of the poem (with a single-volume editio minor published in 1932). According to Volk, "[Housman's] work is famous—some might say notorious—for its bold handling of the text, its incisive commentary, and its merciless ... invective against other scholars." In 1977, G. P. Goold published a Loeb English translation, with substantial introductory notes and diagrams. This was the first translation of the poem into English prose (Book I had been translated into English verse by Edward Sherburne in 1674, and the entire poem by Thomas Creech in 1697). Goold's translation was called "masterly" by Volk and Steven Green. It was reprinted in 1992, and Goold issued a corrected edition in 1997 that took into account, among other things, W. S. Watt's article "Maniliana".

== Impact and scholarship ==
While Manilius is not quoted by any extant Roman author, many scholars argue that he is alluded to by a number of authors, including: Ausonius, Claudian, Commodian, Dracontius, Juvenal, Lucan, Manetho, Martianus Capella, Nemesianus, Orientius, Pseudo-Empedocles, Seneca, Sidonius Apollinaris, Tertullian, Titus Calpurnius Siculus, and Venantius Fortunatus. With this said, Hübner cautions that such assumptions should be considered carefully (or downright rejected, in the cases of Manetho and Pseudo-Empedocles), as the similarities may be due to a lost ancient epic precursor that Manilius and the others were all alluding to or borrowing from. The work of Julius Firmicus Maternus (who wrote in the time of Constantine about astrology and other subjects) resembles Manilius's work in many ways; for instance, in his Matheseos libri octo (composed c. 334–37), Firmicus follows Manilius's method of instruction closely and analyzes the poet's astrological fundamentals. This suggests that Firmicus almost certainly used Manilius (or someone inspired by him) as a guide. But despite the similarity between Firmicus's work and Manilius's, Firmicus neither mentions Manilius by name nor lists him as among the few Romans (viz. Germanicus, Cicero, and Fronto) who wrote about astrology.

Volk notes that the earliest references to Astronomica—aside from literary allusions—may be found in two Roman funerary inscriptions, both of which bear the line, "We are born to die, and our end hangs from the beginning" (nascentes morimur finisque ab origine pendet) from the poem's fourth book. This theory is not without its detractors, and scholars such as A. Maranini and Gómez Pallarès have suggested that these two inscriptions are forgeries dating from the Renaissance.

Few copies of the Astronomica survived into the medieval period, and consequently Manilius seems to have been little read during this period. However, there are a few exceptions to this dearth of attention. Hübner, for instance, writes that Manilius may have inspired some of the writings of Columbanus. Additionally, an AD 988 letter from Gerbertus Aureliacensis to the abbey at Bobbio in which a request is made for a work "by M. Manilius (or possibly Manlius) about astrology" (M. Manilius (v.l. Manlius) de astrologica) is evidence that a copy of the Astronomica was probably kept in the library at Bobbio.

Although it was largely ignored during antiquity and the Middle Ages, the poem generated scholarly interest upon its 15th-century rediscovery. The Italian humanist Lorenzo Bonincontri delivered lectures on the Astronomica to large audiences and compiled his lecture notes into the work's first commentary. Bonincontri was apparently interested in Manilius's treatment of the nature of comets in the first book of the Astronomica, and, according to Stephan Heilen, portions of Bonincontri's De rebus naturalibus et divinis are based on Manilius's work.

Despite the attention it received after its rediscovery, the Astronomica has never been as widely studied as other classical Latin poems. Nonetheless, interest in the poem developed in the second half of the 20th century when scholars began to study Manilius's philosophical and scientific ideas. The first full-length English monograph on Manilius and the Astronomica was Volk's Manilius and His Intellectual Background, which was published in 2009. Two years later, Volk and Green edited Forgotten Stars: Rediscovering Manilius' Astronomica with essays from scholars worldwide. The book's purpose was to "encourage readers to discover Manilius" and expand scholarly interest in the Astronomica, since previous research of the work's poetic, scientific, and philosophical themes had been primarily limited to Germany, France, and Italy. And while Manilius and his poem have been analyzed by scholars, many lay readers find the Astronomica confusing and overly technical. According to Kristine Louise Haugen, "The ambiguous phrases and extravagant circumlocutions necessitated by Manilius's hexameter verse must often have made the Astronomica seem, as it does today, rather like a trigonometry textbook rendered as a Saturday The New York Times crossword."

Scholars have noted the irony of Manilius's relative obscurity, because he wrote the Astronomica in the hope of attaining literary immortality. Housman voiced this sentiment in a dedicatory Latin poem written for the first volume of his edition that contrasted the movement of celestial objects with mortality and the fate of Manilius's work. He compared the Astronomica to a shipwreck (carmina ... naufraga), arguing that it was incomplete and imperfect, having barely survived textual transmission; Housman mused that because Manilius's ambitions of literary fame and immortality had been almost entirely dashed, his work should serve as an example of why "no man ever ought to trust the gods" (ne quis forte deis fidere vellet homo).

== Bibliography ==
- Abry, Josèphe-Henriette (2007). "Manilius and Aratus: Two Stoic Poets on Stars" (PDF). Leeds International Classical Studies. 6: 1–18. ISSN 1477-3643. Archived from the original (PDF) on September 13, 2016.
- Asso, Paolo (October 5, 2003). "D.R. Shackleton Bailey, Statius. Silvae. Loeb Classical Library, 206". Bryn Mawr Classical Review. ISSN 1055-7660.
- Bailey, D. R. Shackleton (1979). "Review Article: The Loeb Manilius". Classical Philology. 74 (2): 158–69. doi:10.1086/366492. ISSN 0009-837X. JSTOR 267675. S2CID 163084388. (subscription required)
- Brind'Amour, Pierre (1983). "Manilius and the Computation of the Ascendant". Classical Philology. 78 (2): 144–48. doi:10.1086/366771. ISSN 0009-837X. JSTOR 269720. S2CID 161089758. (subscription required)
- Brock, M. Dorothy (1911). Studies in Fronto and His Age. Evanston, IL: Northwestern University Press. OCLC 983331173.
- Butterfield, David (2013). The Early Textual History of Lucertius' De rerum natura. Cambridge: Cambridge University Press. ISBN 978-1107037458.
- Campbell, Gordon; Volk, Katharina; Schindler, C. (2004). "Review of The Poetics of Latin Didactic: Lucretius, Vergil, Ovid, Manilius". The Journal of Roman Studies. 94: 209–10. doi:10.2307/4135033. ISSN 0075-4358. JSTOR 4135033. S2CID 161643155. (subscription required)
- Chisholm, Hugh, ed. (1911). "Manilius" . Encyclopædia Britannica. Vol. 17 (11th ed.). Cambridge University Press. pp. 580–581.
- Ellis, Robinson (1904). "A New Edition of Manilius, Book I". Hermathena. XIII (XXX) – via The Internet Archive.
- Gain, D. B. (1970). "Gerber and Manilius". Latomus. 29 (1): 128–32.
- Garrod, H. (1933). "Housman's Manilius (Editio Minor) – M. Manilii Astronomica. Recensuit Housman A. E.. Editio minor. pp. xvi, 181. Cambridge: University Press, 1932". The Classical Review. 47 (1): 26–27. doi:10.1017/S0009840X00061060. S2CID 163304549.
- Gee, Emma (2013). Aratus and the Astronomical Tradition. Oxford: Oxford University Press. ISBN 978-0199781782.
- Goold, G. P., ed. (1997) [1977]. "Introduction". Astronomica (3 ed.). Cambridge, MA: Harvard University Press. pp. xi–cxxiii. ISBN 978-0674995161.
- Grafton, Anthony; Most, Glenn W.; Settis, Salvatore (2010). The Classical Tradition. Cambridge, MA: Harvard University Press. ISBN 978-0674035720.
- Green, Steven (2014). Disclosure and Discretion in Roman Astrology. Oxford: Oxford University Press. ISBN 978-0199646807.
- Green, Steven; Volk, Katharina (2011). "Preface". In Green, Steven; Volk, Katharina (eds.). Forgotten Stars: Rediscovering Manilius' Astronomica. Oxford: Oxford University Press. pp. vii–ix. ISBN 978-0199586462.
- Hatch, Robert A. (2007). Hockey, Thomas; Trimble, Virginia; Williams, Thomas; Bracher, Katherine; Jarrell, Richard; Marché II, Jordan; Ragep, F. Jamil; Palmeri, JoAnn; Bolt, Marvin (eds.). Biographical Encyclopedia of Astronomers. Berlin: Springer Science & Business Media. ISBN 978-0387304007.
- Haugen, Kristine Louise (2011). Richard Bentley. Cambridge, MA: Harvard University Press. ISBN 978-0674058712.
- Heilen, Stephan (2011). "Lorenzo Bonincontri's Reception of Manilius' Chapter on Comets (Astr. 1.809–926)". In Green, Steven; Volk, Katharina (eds.). Forgotten Stars: Rediscovering Manilius' Astronomica. Oxford: Oxford University Press. pp. 278–310. ISBN 978-0199586462.
- Housman, A. E., ed. (1903). "Introduction" (PDF). M. Manilii Astronomicon Liber 1. Cambridge: Cambridge University Press. pp. vii–lxxv. OCLC 946500303.
- Housman, A. E., ed. (1916). "Introduction" (PDF). M. Manilii Astronomicon Liber 3. Cambridge: Cambridge University Press. pp. v–xxx. OCLC 831157576.
- Housman, A. E., ed. (1930). "Introduction". M. Manilii Astronomicon Liber 5. Cambridge: Cambridge University Press. pp. v–xlvi. OCLC 889948016.
- Hübner, Wolfgang (2006). "Paranatellonta". In Canicik, Hubert; Schneider, Helmuth (eds.). Brill's New Pauly. Leiden, Netherlands: Brill. doi:10.1163/1574-9347_bnp_e907920 – via BrillOnline Reference Works.
- Hübner, Wolfgang (2012). "Manilius, Astronomica". In Walde, Christine; Egger, Brigitte (eds.). Brill's New Pauly Supplements I – Volume 5: The Reception of Classical Literature. Leiden, Netherlands: Brill. doi:10.1163/2214-8647_bnps5_e720840 – via BrillOnline Reference Works.
- Keith, Alison (2013). A Latin Epic Reader: Selections from Ten Epics. Mundelein, IL: Bolchazy-Carducci. ISBN 978-1610411103.
- MacGregor, Alexander (2005). "Was Manilius really a Stoic?". Illinois Classical Studies. 30: 41–65. ISSN 0363-1923. JSTOR 23065297.
- Manilius (1920). Housman, A. E. (ed.). M. Manilii Astronomicon Liber 4 (PDF). Cambridge: Cambridge University Press. OCLC 889946457. Archived from the original (PDF) on May 24, 2015.
- Manilius (1930). Housman, A. E. (ed.). M. Manilii Astronomicon Liber 5 (PDF). Cambridge: Cambridge University Press. OCLC 889948016. Archived from the original (PDF) on May 24, 2015.
- Manilius (1992) [1977]. Astronomica. Translated by Goold, G. P. (2 ed.). Cambridge, MA: Harvard University Press. ISBN 978-0674995161.
- Moul, Victoria, ed. (2017). A Guide to Neo-Latin Literature. Cambridge: Cambridge University Press. ISBN 978-1316849040.
- Pingree, David (1980). "Reviewed Works: Manilius, Astronomica by G. P. Goold, Manilius". Phoenix. 34 (3): 263–66. doi:10.2307/1087125. JSTOR 1087125. (subscription required)
- Sister Wilfrid (December 17, 1928). "Is There an Africitas?". The Classical Weekly. 22 (10): 73–78. doi:10.2307/4389237. JSTOR 4389237. (subscription required)
- Stark, Caroline (2011). "Renaissance Receptions of Manilius' Anthropology". In Green, Steven; Volk, Katharina (eds.). Forgotten Stars: Rediscovering Manilius' Astronomica. Oxford: Oxford University Press. pp. 261–77. ISBN 978-0199586462.
- Steele, R. B. (1932). "The Astronomica of Manilius". American Journal of Philology. 53 (4): 320–43. doi:10.2307/290230. JSTOR 290230. (subscription required)
- Verrall, Arthur Woollgar (1913). "Poetry to the End of the Augustan Age". In Sandys, John Edwyn (ed.). A Companion to Latin Studies (2 ed.). Cambridge: Cambridge University Press. pp. 602–46. OCLC 922009237.
- Volk, Katharina (2002). The Poetics of Latin Didactic: Lucretius, Vergil, Ovid, Manilius. Oxford: Oxford University Press. ISBN 978-0199245505.
- Volk, Katharina (2003). "Manilius' Solitary Chariot-Ride ("Astronomica" 2.138–40)". The Classical Quarterly. 53 (2): 628–33. doi:10.1093/cq/53.2.628. ISSN 0009-8388. JSTOR 3556230. (subscription required)
- Volk, Katharina (2009). Manilius and His Intellectual Background. Oxford: Oxford University Press. ISBN 978-0199265220.
- Volk, Katharina (2010). "Literary Theft and Roman Water Rights in Manilius' Second Proem". Materiali e Discussioni per l'Analisi dei Testi Classici (65): 187–97. ISSN 0392-6338. JSTOR 25800980. (subscription required)
- Volk, Katharina (2011). "Introduction: A Century of Manilian Scholarship". In Green, Steven; Volk, Katharina (eds.). Forgotten Stars: Rediscovering Manilius' Astronomica. Oxford: Oxford University Press. pp. 1–12. ISBN 978-0199586462.
- Volk, Katharina (2014). "Manilius' Cosmos of the Senses". In Butler, Shane; Purves, Alex (eds.). Synaesthesia and the Ancient Senses. Abingdon-on-Thames, UK: Routledge. ISBN 978-1317547143.
