= Cronheim =

- Stadtteil of Gunzenhausen
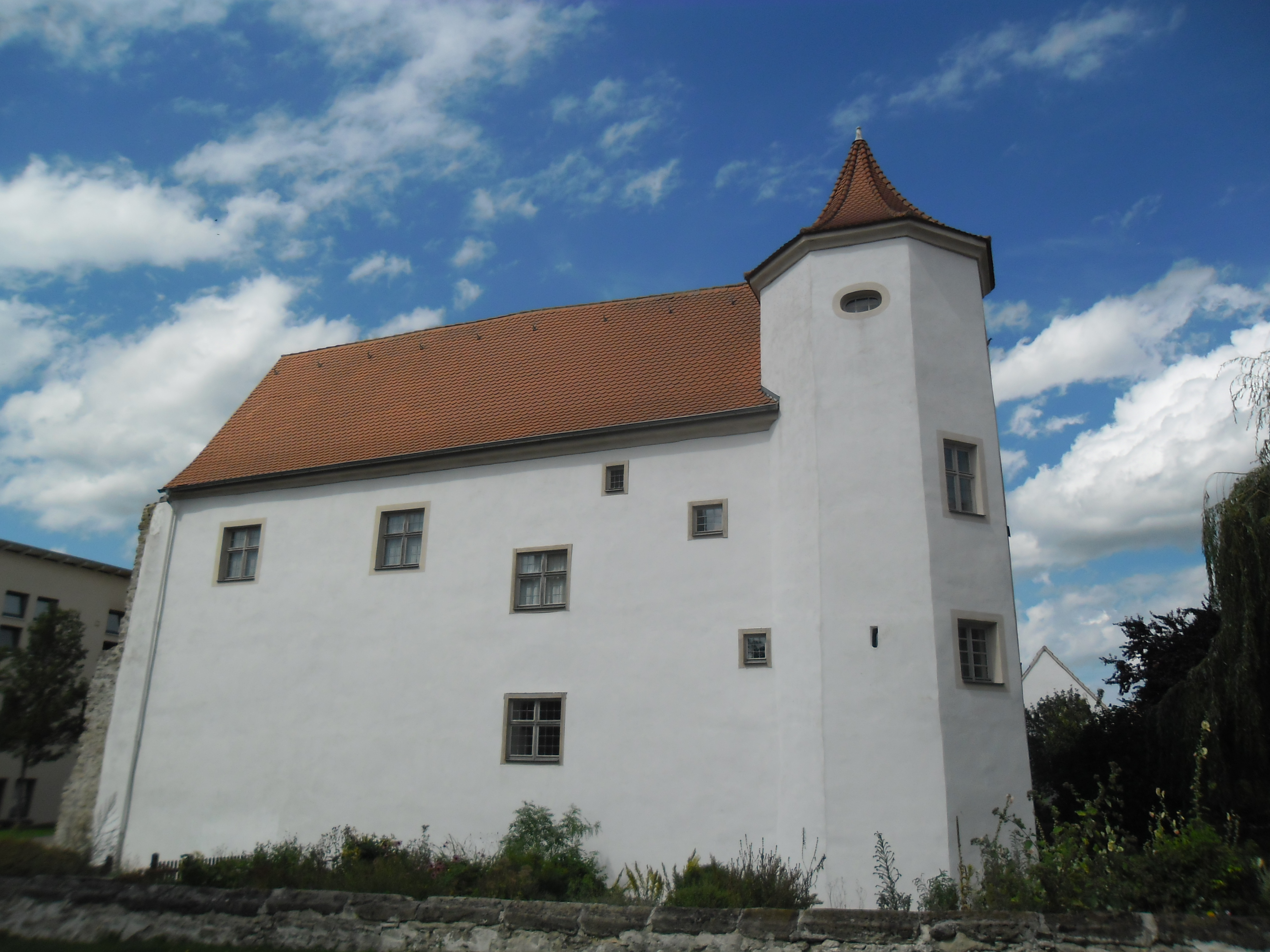
- Cronheim Castle Historic Monument # D-5-77-136-149

- Coat of arms
- Interactive map of Cronheim
- Location within Germany Location within Bavaria
- Coordinates: 49°05′48″N 10°39′50″E
- Country: Germany
- State: Bavaria
- Admin. region: Mittelfranken
- District: Weißenburg-Gunzenhausen
- Town: Gunzenhausen

Population
  - Total: 526
- Time zone: UTC+01:00 (CET)
  - Summer (DST): UTC+02:00 (CEST)
- Website: www.gunzenhausen.de

Cronheim is a village in the municipality of Gunzenhausen in the Weißenburg-Gunzenhausen district which forms part of the Bavarian Government district (in German: Regierungbezirk) of Mittelfranken. The hamlet of Filchenhard forms part of Cronheim.

== Location ==
Cronheim is situated in the Franconian Lake District (in German: Fränkisches Seenland), approximately seven kilometres west of Gunzenhausen. Bavarian state road 2218 lies north of the village.

== History ==
=== Prehistoric and Protohistoric Time ===
The area around Cronheim was already populated in prehistoric and protohistoric time, proven by a circular earthwork in the north and two grave mounds in the south part of the village.

=== Hallstatt culture ca. 600BC to 100AC ===
The human population occupying the region from around 600 BC to 100 AC belonged to the Celtic Hallstatt culture. By the 6th century BC, the Hallstatt culture had expanded to include wide territories, falling into two zones, east and west, between them covering much of western and central Europe down to the Alps, and extending into northern Italy. In the neighboring village Kleinlellenfeld, north west of Cronheim, remains of a Celtic settlement along with a Viereckschanze were found.

=== Romans 90CE to 259CE ===
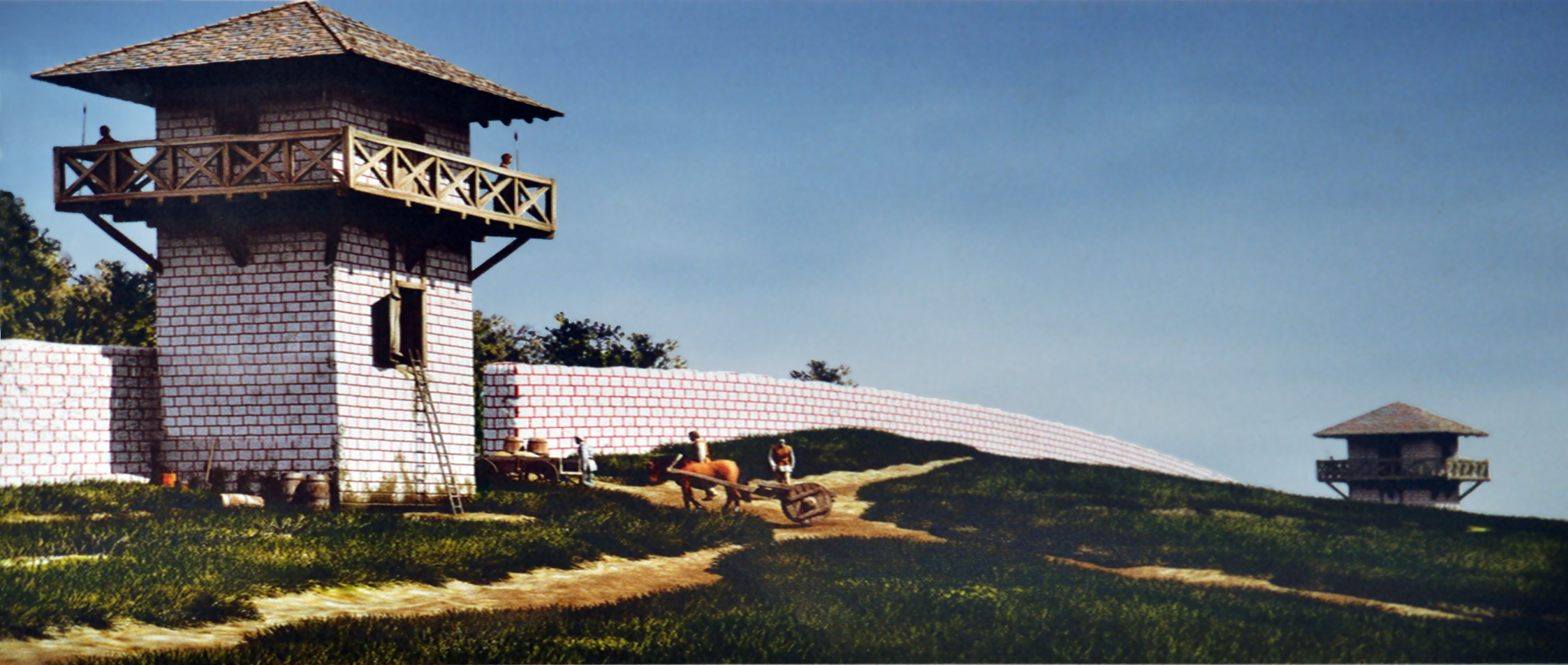
Model of the Roman Upper Germanic-Rhaetian Limes

In the year 90 the Romans expelled the Celts, occupied the inhabited areas north of the Donau River and expanded into the area. The Celtic population wasn't banished from the region by the Romans but made tributary to them. To protect and get control over the borders, the Romans started back in 138 under the Roman Caesar Antoninus Pius to extend the Roman boundary wall, Upper Germanic-Rhaetian Limes, and also included now the area north of Cronheim. Thanks to dendrochronological investigations of the wood used for the construction for the part of the Limes passing Cronheim, we now know that it was cut in 162, at the time when Marcus Aurelius was the Roman emperor, when this particular section of the Limes was built. In the second century two Roman military roads crossed at the location where Cronheim is now situated.

=== Alemanni 259CE to 496CE ===
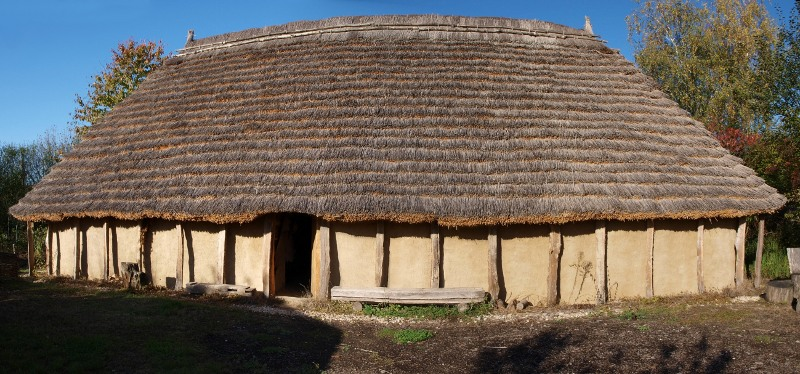
Reconstruction of an Alemanni Home in Vörstetten

After occupying the region for over 150 years, the German tribe Alemanni invaded the area and destroyed the Roman fortress in nearby Gunzenhausen in 241. Between 259 and 260CE the Alemmani finally overran the Limes and occupied the land. The Alemmani neither banished the old Celtic nor their Roman invaders from the land. Like the Romans before, the Alemmani allowed the people to stay under the condition to accept bondage to the conquerors. As a signal of bondage men were not allowed to wear beards or weapons. The Alemanni preferred to live in wooden houses and avoided the stone buildings the Romans constructed. The abandoned Roman constructions collapsed over the years. Thanks to that still Roman monuments can be marvelled in the "Burgstallwald" in nearby Gunzenhausen and other locations in the region, whereas Alemanni inheritances are rather rare. Villages ending with "ingen" that are in the direct neighborhood of Cronheim such as Oberschwaningen, Unterschwaningen, Altentrüdingen, Wassertrüdingen etc. were most likely founded by the Alemanni. After the loss of the Battle of Tolbiac in 496, the Alemanni were partly conquered by Clovis I, leader of the German tribe Franks and incorporated into his dominions along with the Christian religion. This caused that parts of the Alemanni population moved, under the protectorate of the Ostrogoths emperor Theoderic the Great, further south. Even after the Alemanni lost the decisive Battle of Tolbiac against their German sister tribe the Franks, they mainly managed to keep their autonomous status. The roots of noble family of the Agilolfings that from this time on ruled the Duchy of Bavaria is not quite clear. Some see their roots in the Frank dynasty, others in the Alemanni dynasty.

=== 5th to 15th century ===
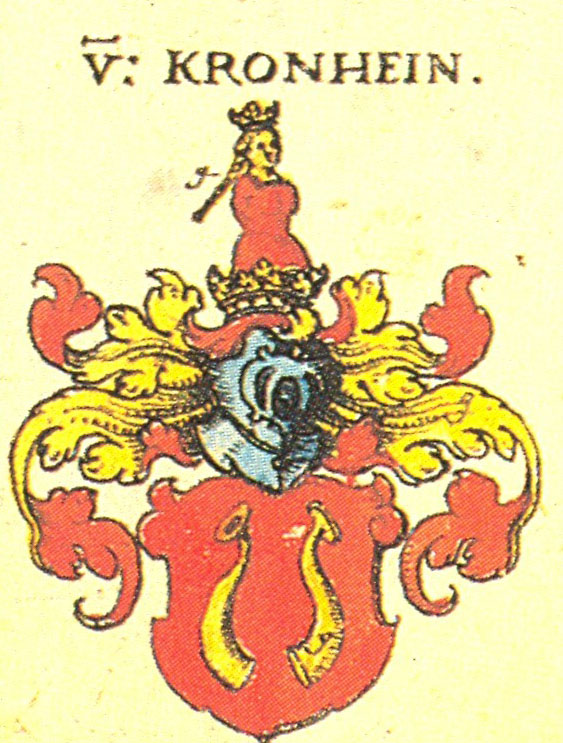
Coat of Arms - Knights of Kronheim

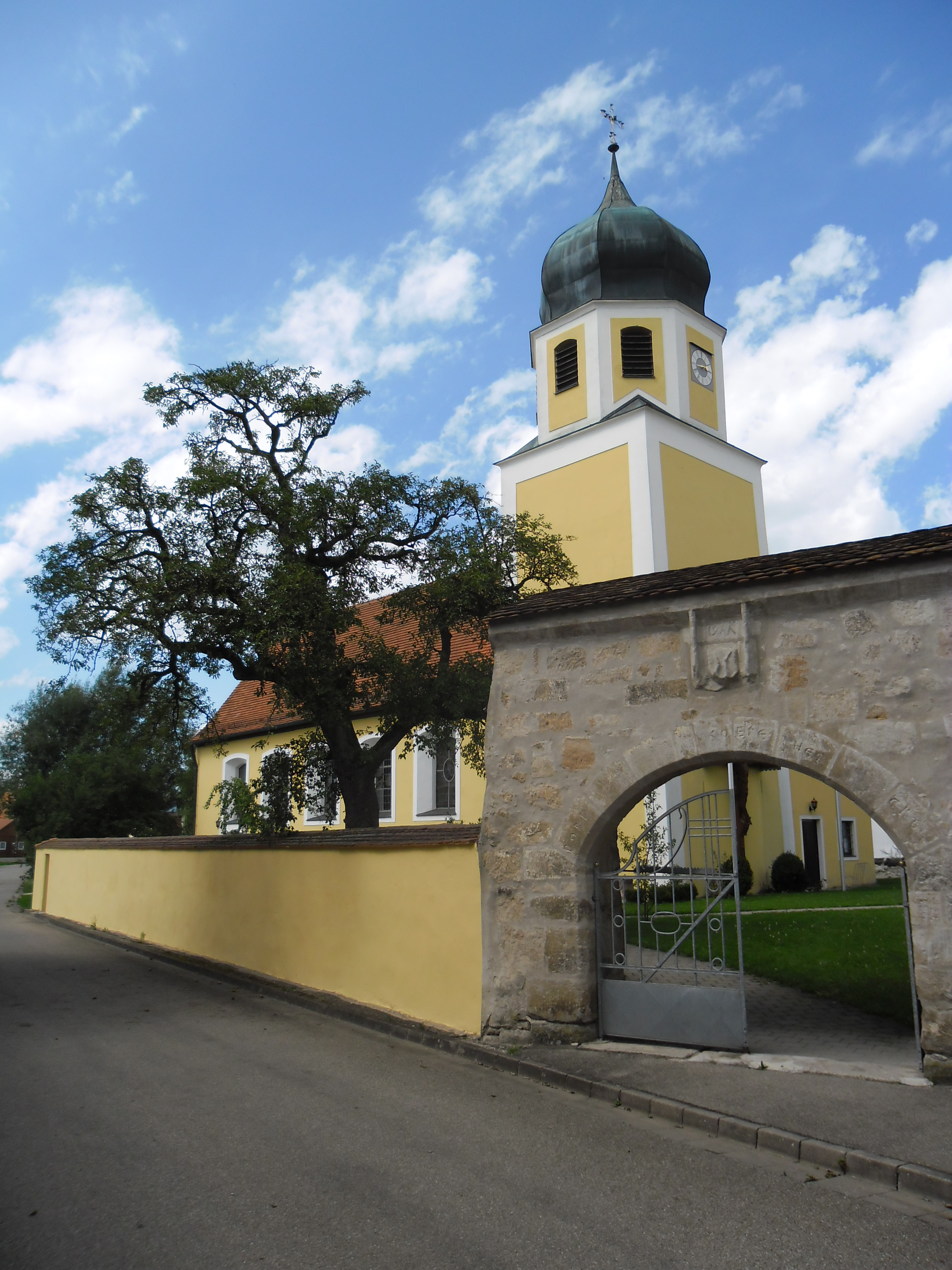
Church with parts of the medieval protection wall and gate. Historic Monument # D-5-77-136-148

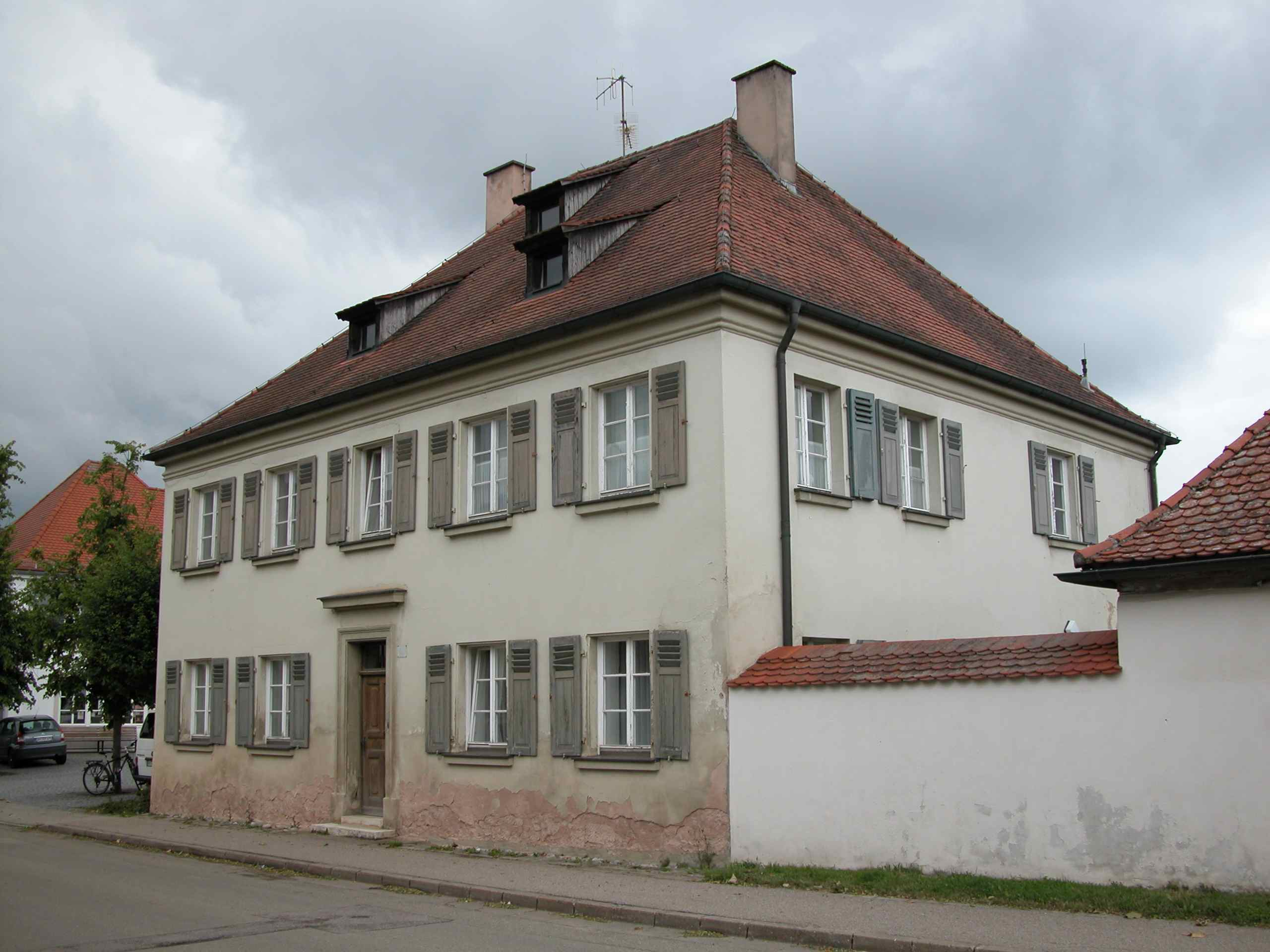
Allodium, later Priest House, constructed around 1140 remodeled 1749. Historic Monument # D-5-77-136-151

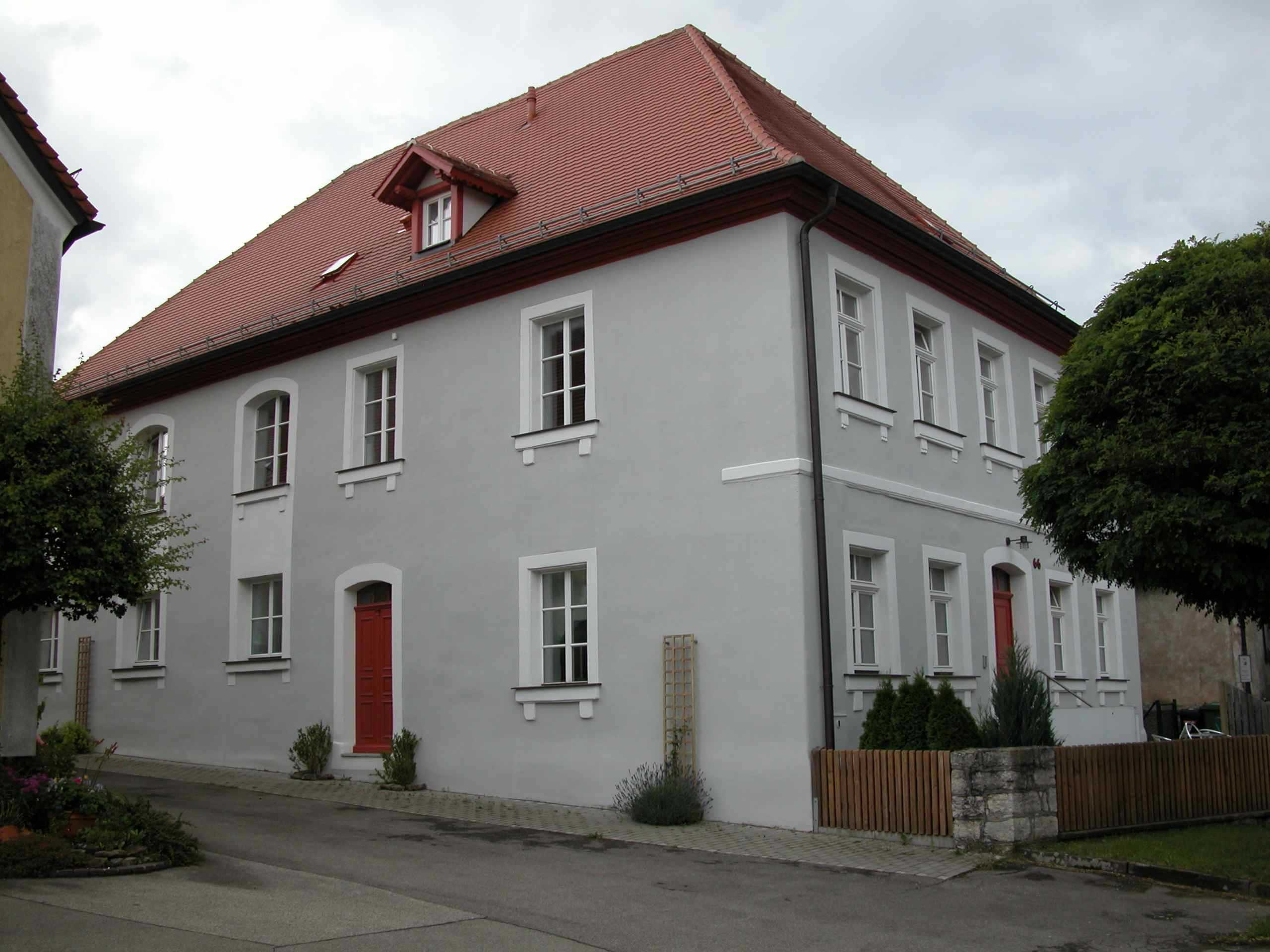
Synagogue, built 1816. Historic Monument # D-5-77-136-155

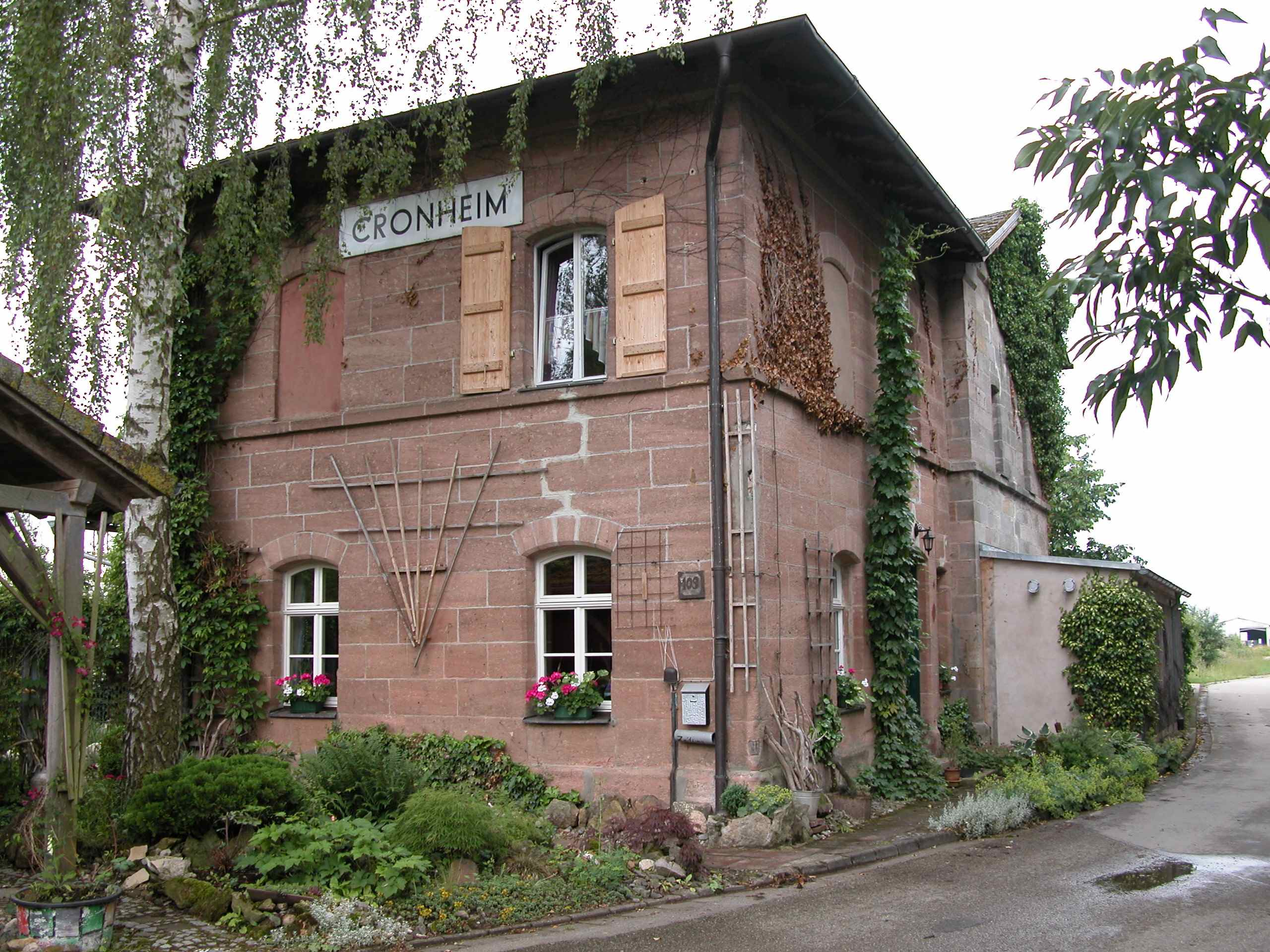
Train Station built 1868/70. Historic Monument # D-5-77-136-156

Cronheim was mentioned for the first time in 800CE as the foundation of a man named “Cracho.” In medieval times Cronheim was a free and independent manor, including the full authority over the village and the ordinary jurisdiction. A stone with the coat of arms of the knights of Kronheim that was in the old castle is dated 1111 that indicates the time when the first castle, the Allodium, was built. If the knights of Cronheim were constructing the Castle Cronheim and named it after themselves or the other way around isn't documented. At the beginning of the 13th century a new, more representative castle was constructed nearby. It was changed and enlarged various times until it finally burned down in 1403. The old castle, the Allodium, was rented out to the church that used it as the priest house. Thanks to that circumstance large parts of the old construction could be preserved until today.

In a document dated June 9, 1272 a Ludwig von Craigenheim (Cronheim) was mentioned. He exchanged the churches St. Peter and St. Walburg in the village of Stetten for properties in Norsteten (Nordstetten (Gunzenhausen)) with bishop Hildebrand of Möhren. Hans von Cronheim (died around 1427) was an assistant at the 15 May 1381 execution of robber-knight Eppelein von Gailingen, who had his hide-out in Wald.

Most likely due to the fire at the castle of Cronheim in 1403 Hans von Cronheim and his wife Anna were selling four properties in Aha to the Teutonic Order in Nuremberg, along with a grange in Sachsenhofen to Kuntz von Eschenbach zu Obern-Eschenbach and Margretha, his wife.

In 1406 they sold their part of the castle Burleswagen near Crailsheim that they bought from Weiprecht of Wolmershausen, to Jörg Lankwarter. A Jakob of Kronheim was married with Anna von Habsberg. A Wilhelm of Cronheim (d. 1485) was a member of the brotherhood Prämonstratenser-Order St. Marien auf dem Harlunger Berg. This may be an indicator of an allegiance with Frederick I, Elector of Brandenburg. A Hans Georg of Kronheim is mentioned in a 11 May 1551 document as a witness in a contract between shepherds in the district of the knights of Absperg.

=== Modern history ===
With Hans Georg of Kronheim the dynasty of the Cronheims ended in the male line. As his daughter Barbara was married to the caretaker of the Roman Catholic Diocese of Eichstätt, Matthias of Leonrod, the manor went to the knights of Leonrod following their deaths. Barbara is buried in the Church of Herrieden.

In 1564 the knights of Leonrod began construction of today's Water castle in Cronheim where the reeve was located. Another daughter of Hans Georg of Kronheim, Ester, was married to Ernst of Rechenberg, whose common daughter married Sebastian Neustädter genannt Stürmer, son of Elisabeth of Wolmershausen. Whether Walpurg von Kronheim, married to the marshal Hugo Vogt of Alten-Sumerau zu Prasberg, was a daughter of Hans Georg, is unclear. If she was, Hans Georg's wife was Maria Jacobe of Schinen.

Cronheim had been a Catholic community. That changed 1560 with the implementation of the Brandanburgian Church Order (Lutheran). Already in 1558 the catholic priest at this time in Cronheim, Georg Hass, married, violating the Catholic rule of Celibacy, his housekeeper under the protection of the dukes of Brandenburg-Onolzbach.

In 1580 the manor Cronheim went to Sir Sebastian Neustädter genannt Stürmer, before he sold it 1595 for 47.000 Guilder to his brother in law Sir Friedrich von Eyb zu Eybburg, including the prebendary in Cronheim that he bought back in 1592. Sir Veit Erasmus von Eyb sold the manor 1617 to Sir Johann Phillipp von Bimbach. When 1626 the German Emperor Ferdinand II. called out the imperial ban on Sir Johann Phillipp von Bimbach the manor went to the emperor who then handed it over to Duke Nikolaus Fugger under the condition that the village has to be catholic "forever". Already in 1630 Duke Nikolaus Fugger sold the manor to the Prince-Bishop of Eichstätt, Johann Christoph von Westerstetten, with the nickname "Witch Bishop", who then forced the community to become catholic again and banished the Jewish of the village. The Protestant priest, Johann Boeckler, father of Johann Heinrich and Georg Andreas who both later became famous academics, was forced 1628 to resign from his position as priest and finally banished in 1634. Both sons of him were born in the previous priest house of Cronheim that has been re-built in 1749 and today is a listed historic monument, next to other buildings in Cronheim. From 1629, other sources refer to 1634, the community in Cronheim again was catholic.

In 1635, during the Thirty Years' War (1618 to 1648), the only buildings in Cronheim still standing were the Church, the priest-house, the house of the blacksmith and a tile house. The majority of the surrounding farms were destroyed. In 1652, after the Peace of Westphalia (1648), the Diocese of Eichstätt had to return the manor to its initial owners, the Reichsritters Fuchs von Bimmbach. The protest of the Prince-Bishop Marquard II Schenk von Castell was rejected and so the manor went to Karl Fuchs as his brother had died in the meantime. The prebendary in Cronheim remained with the Diocese of Eichstätt. When Karl Fuchs was selling the manor to Duke Johann Heinrich Notthafft, the Prince-Bishop of Eichstätt managed to get the preemption right on the manor. From 1658 onwards the new owner, Duke Johann Heinrich, allowed the Jewish community to return. After only ten years of ownership, 1661, he offered the manor to the Teutonic Order in Nuremberg. However, the deal was delayed so finally Prince-Bishop Marquard II. Schenk von Castell stepped into the contract and bought the manor Cronheim on August 2, 1661 for the Diocese. The new owner began 1666 with the extension of the church, renovated it and added a new top on the church tower. He continued and even expanded the Jewish immigration politics of the previous owner. He offered Jewish to settle down in Cronheim under the condition that they re-build the houses and re-activate the farming business. This politics led into an investment boom. 55 new houses and 30 barns were built. The Jewish were allowed to build a school and a synagogue. Further they were allowed to nominate a speaker who had the authority to negotiate with the local government. Back in 1658 Cronheim was the only community in the territory of the Diocese Eichstätt that allowed Jewish to settle. In 1816 the Jewish community built a new synagogue in Cronheim, further the Nördlingen–Gunzenhausen railway was built in 1848 and Cronheim had a railway station.

The flourishing Jewish community in Cronheim ended in October 1938 with the housebreaking into the synagogue where the interior was destroyed. The building was sold shortly afterwards and the Jewish sanctuaries were given to the Jewish community in Munich where they were destroyed during Kristallnacht.

In 1961 504 residents lived in 103 houses plus 57 residents in the neighbor village Filchenhard in 14 houses.

On April 1, 1971 Cronheim lost its independence status and became part of the community in Gunzenhausen. November 29, 1985 the German railway, Deutsche Bundesbahn, discontinued the railway service in Cronheim. However, currently there are plans to re-activate it as the area of the "Franconian Lake District" becomes more and more attractive for tourists due to its close location to the Altmühlsee that was artificially created in 1985 as part of a water regulation project among other lakes in the area. Leisure time facilities such as bike trails, wind-surfing, sailing, hiking and others are making the area very attractive for tourism that since then is growing rapidly. The association "AWO Kreisverband Roth-Schwabach e.V." is running a therapy center in the Castle of Cronheim where they also maintain the public museum "Mikrokosmos Cronheim, ein Dorf - drei Religionen" - "Microcosm Cronheim, one Village - three Religions" living next to each other. It shows next to the unresistant history of the castles the challenges of the three religions, Catholics, Protestants and Jewish - "The Three Crowns of Cro(w)nheim".

== Notable residents ==
- Johann Heinrich Boeckler, born 13 December 1611 in Cronheim
- Georg Andreas Boeckler, born around 1617 in Cronheim
