= Zodiac Man =

Human body linked to signs of the Zodiac

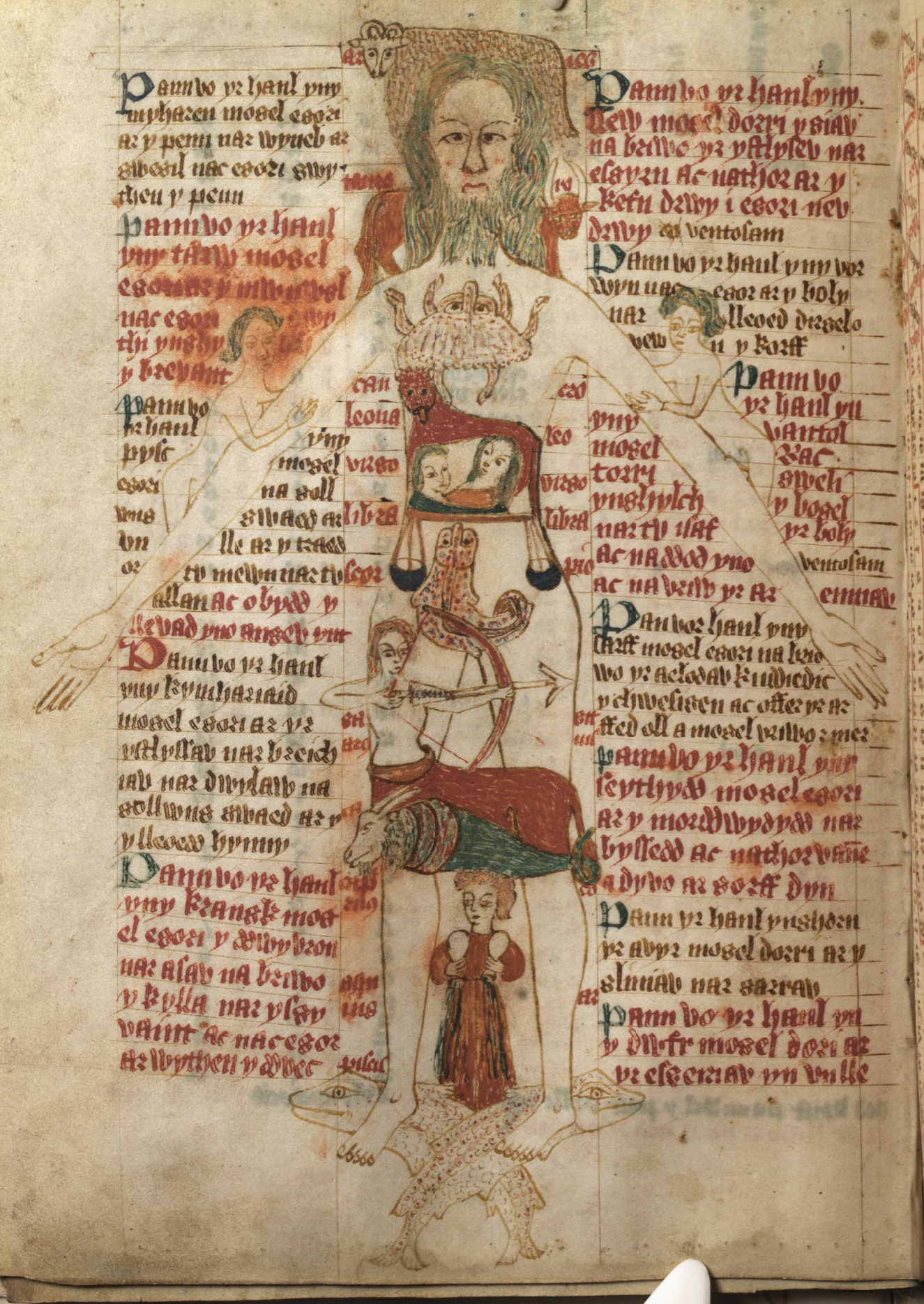
'The Zodiac Man' a diagram of a human body and astrological symbols from a 15th-century Welsh manuscript

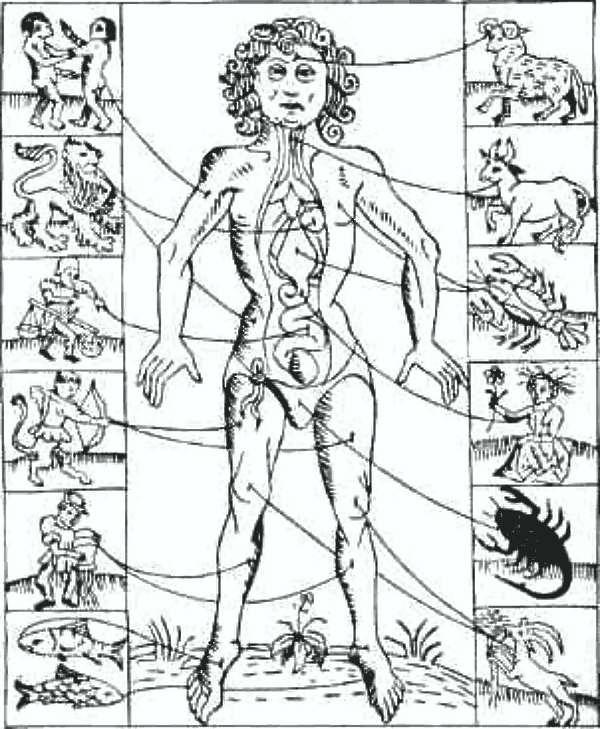
Zodiacal man from a woodcut in a 1702 almanac.

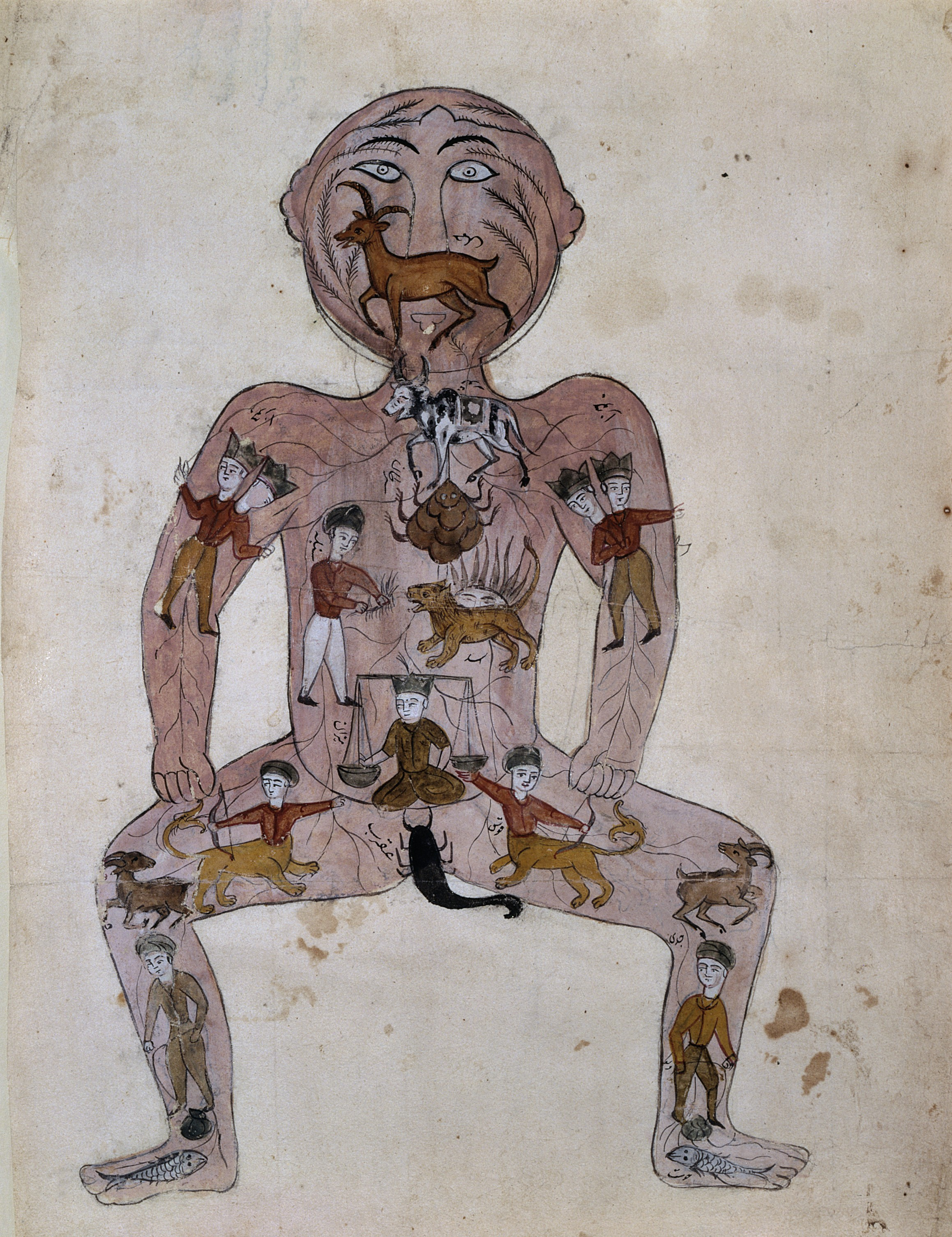
19th-century copy of Zakhireye Khwarazmshahi, by Ismail Gorgani

Sometimes depicted in writings and drawings from ancient classical, medieval, and modern times, the Zodiac Man (Homo Signorum or "Man of Signs") represents a roughly consistent correlation of zodiacal names with body parts.

The Zodiac Man appeared most frequently in calendars, devotional Books of Hours, and treatises on philosophy, astrology, and medicine in the medieval era.

Before the emergence of scientific empiricism in the 17th century, medieval physicians looked to the skies for guidance. Having observed that the overhead moon brought high tides, they theorized the dangers of letting blood from a body part whose zodiacal sign was occupied by the moon since a tide of blood might gush out uncontrollably.

== Table of correspondences ==
The association of body parts with zodiac signs remained relatively consistent during antiquity and into the medieval period. The "primary" associations are both the oldest and the most common.

Sign	Primary association	Secondary associations
Aries	head	eyes, adrenals, blood pressure
Taurus	neck	throat, shoulders, ears
Gemini	shoulders	lungs, nerves, arms, fingers
Cancer	chest	breasts, sides, some bodily fluids and organs
Leo	sides	stomach, heart, spine, upper back, spleen
Virgo	belly	abdomen, intestines, gallbladder, pancreas, liver
Libra	buttocks	hips, lower back, kidneys, endocrines
Scorpio	genitalia	pelvis, urinary bladder, rectum
Sagittarius	thighs	legs, hips, groin
Capricorn	knees	shin, bones, skin, sinew, nerve
Aquarius	lower leg	ankle, calf, some blood vessels
Pisces	feet	sole, extremity

== Ancient origins ==
The concept of the Zodiac Man dates to the Hellenistic era in which the earliest exposition appears in Manilius's Astronomica (II. 453–465; IV. 701–710). However, a cuneiform tablet of unknown date gives a nearly identical list of bodily divisions that possibly but not certainly could have been created before Manilius. A Greek text (περὶ μελῶν ζωδίων - On the limbs of the zodiacal sign) describing the subdivision of zodiac signs into dodecatemoria (signs within signs) suggests that Zodiac Man (or Zodiac Animal, modified slightly to suit each sign) could also be associated with the idea of this "micro-zodiac". Overall, the idea of Zodiac Man goes back thousands of years to Babylonia where the body was considered to work in tune with the heavenly bodies. The general system of zodiac signs relating to healing is thought to predate Manilius by several centuries and has been attributed to philosophers such as Pythagoras, Democritus, Aristotle, and Hermes.

== Astrological medicine ==
The Zodiac Man was used in medieval medicine to determine the correct time for surgery, medication, bloodletting, and other procedures. The foremost rule was to avoid interfering with a body part when the moon could be found in its corresponding sign. This injunction was attributed to Claudius Ptolemy: "Membrum ferro ne percutito, cum Luna signum tenuerit, quod membro illi dominatur."

Wherever the moon and stars are aligned with a certain astrological sign, they correlated with a body part, bodily system, or the four humors. The four humors separate the body into four parts just as there are four elements. The four humors of the human body are yellow bile, black bile, phlegm, and blood; it was believed that these all needed to be in balance in order to keep up with your health. These humors were used directly to treat illness alongside Zodiac Man and were also used to explain and simplify concepts to patients. Europe was, at the time, required by law to calculate the moon’s positioning before taking action on a patient or any kind of medical procedure. If the moon was not in its correct positioning, nothing was able to be performed because it was deemed unsafe. They used a volvelle, a rotating calendar, to calculate the moon’s position as well as multiple almanacs which described different phases of the moon.

Most of the ways that illnesses were determined and diagnosed was through the four humors, especially through blood and yellow bile, better known as urine. This was one of the main ways people were diagnosed. Many pictures of Zodiac Man solely depict the main body parts correlating with the astrological signs, but others go more in depth to then match the signs with internal bodily systems.

Over time leading into the Middle Ages, the belief of the Zodiac Man slowly faded out due to new scientific discoveries. While physicians, scientists, and doctors may have become wearier on the diagram and medical astrology, the people did not. The ordinary public stood by their belief of the signs the way they depicted the human body and its dependence on the moon.

== Religion ==
The Zodiac Man is read and created off the skies and stars or most commonly labeled as the moving heavenly bodies. This suggests a clear pathway to a religious aspect in zodiacal readings. Astrology was united with Christianity during the medieval period and medicine also tended to work hand in hand with the prevailing Christian customs at the time. The signs of the zodiac are considered very spiritual but of course not only associated with Christianity, they are also associated with countless other religions as well including Islam and Judaism.

== Related Figures ==
Besides Zodiac Man, other human figures and diagrams are also well known and were used in ancient time. There is the Vein Man, the Woman, Wound Man, Disease Man, and the Skeleton. These figures are all using different models and although it is difficult to say if there is any direct relationship between all of these, they are all focused on the human body, which is a large factor in the Zodiac Man’s history. There are other figures among them as well, but these are all most similar to the Zodiac Man. There are also several different Zodiac Man adaptations made such as Dutch, German, and Venetian.

== See also ==
- Adam Kadmon
- Astrology
- Babylonian astrology
- Vesalius
