= Georg Andreas Böckler =

German architect and engineer (c. 1617 –1687)

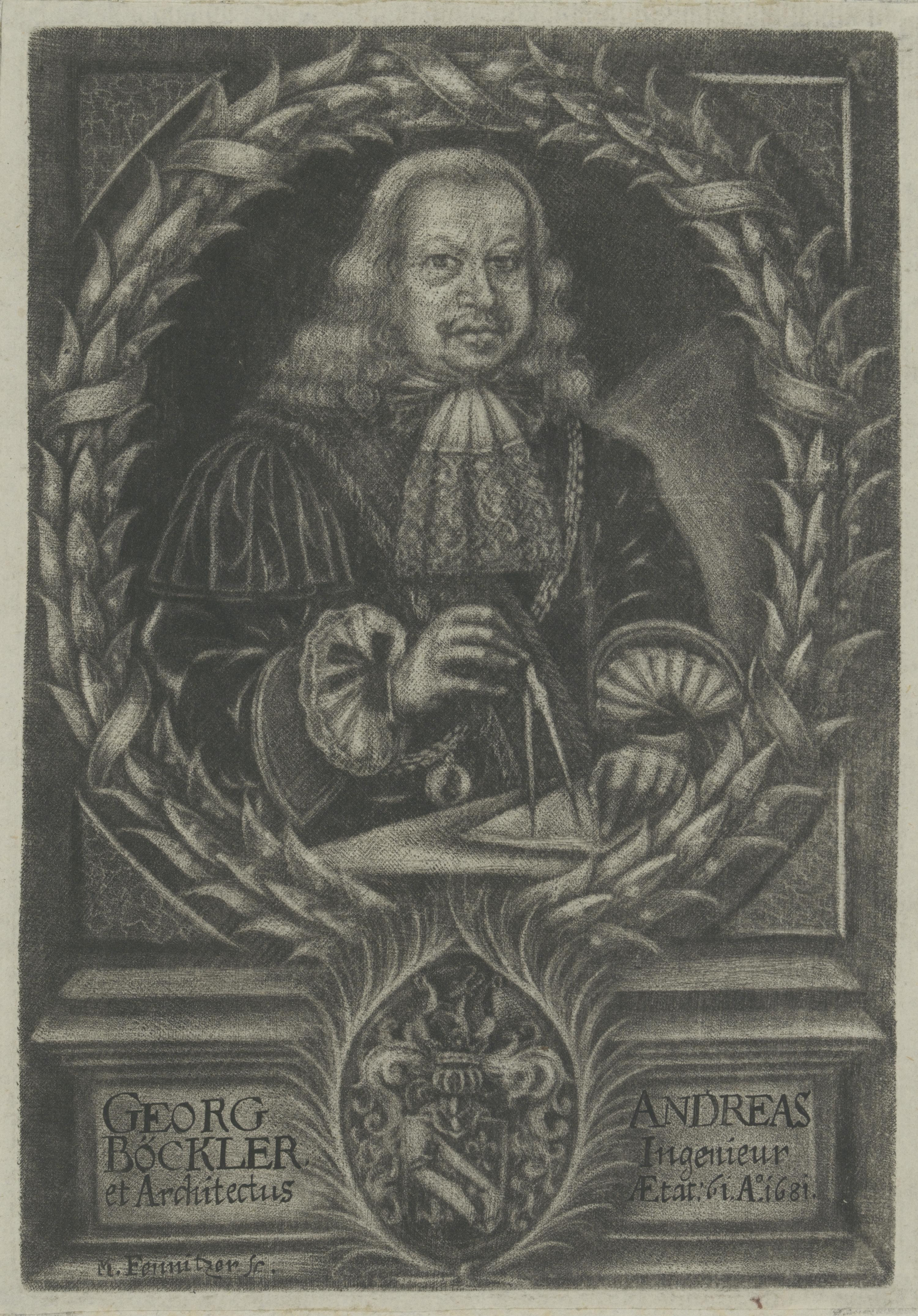
Georg Andreas Böckler, 1681

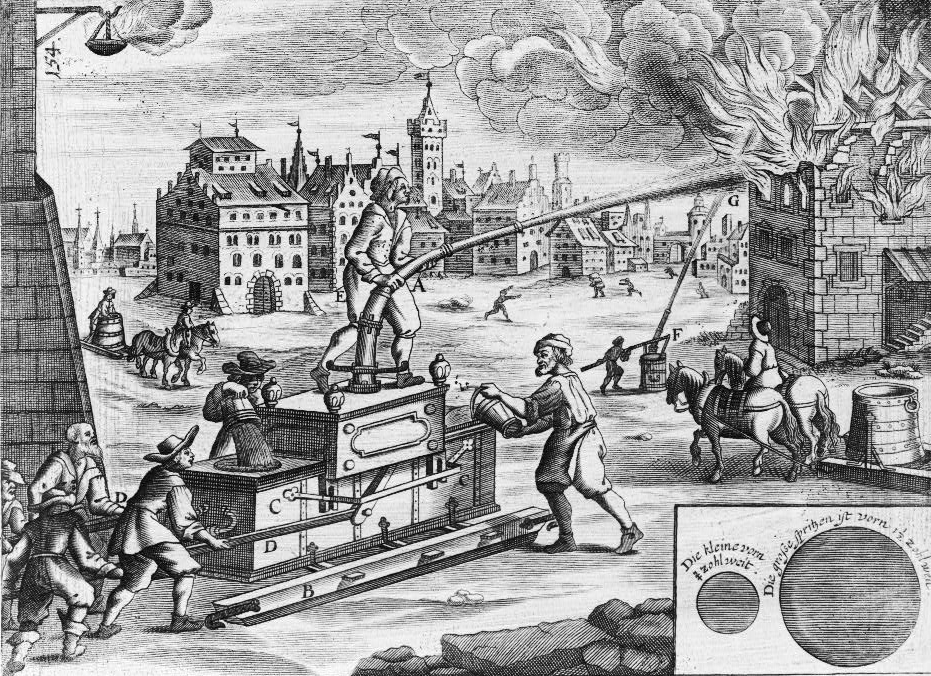
Illustration from Georg Andreas Böckler's Theatrum Machinarum Novum showing men operating a water pump to put out a fire (1661, Nuremberg in German; Cologne in Latin in 1662)

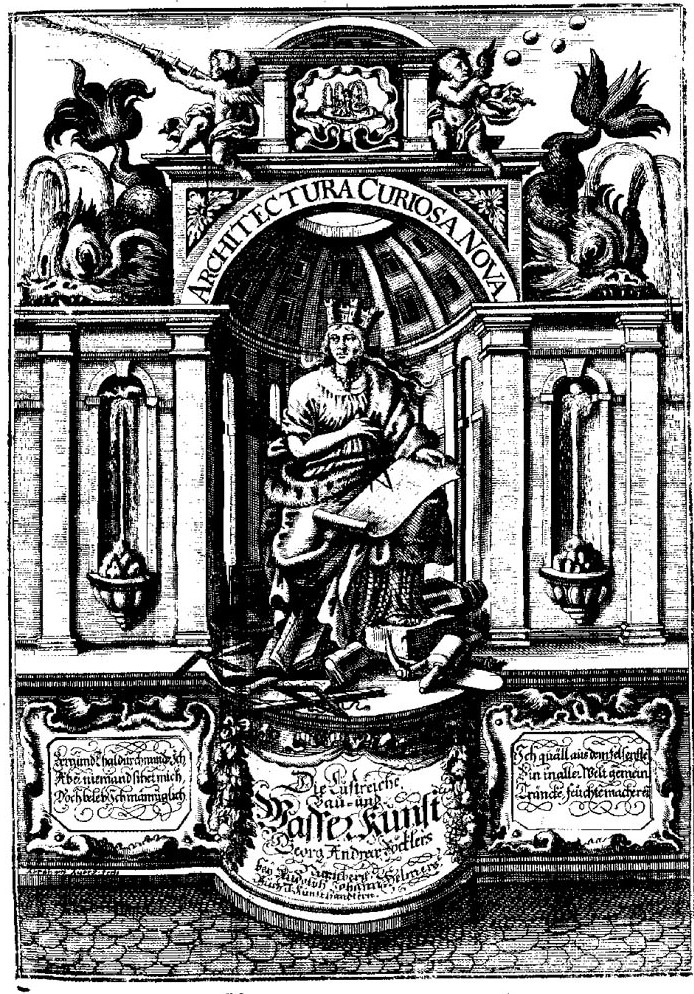
Architectura curiosa nova, 1701

Georg Andreas Böckler (c. 1617 – 21 February 1687) (Note: Various sources give a range of years for Böckler of 1644 to 1698 (the latter being the date of a posthumous publication of one of his works), but other sources give a more precise range, with an approximate birth year of 1617 and a death date of 21 February 1687.) was a German architect and engineer who wrote Architectura Curiosa Nova (1664) and Theatrum Machinarum Novum (1661).

== Biography ==
Born in Cronheim, he was an architect in the city of Nuremberg and specialized in hydraulic architecture. Architectura Curiosa Nova was his most important work. It is mainly a book on theory and application of hydrodynamics for fountains, water-jets, garden fountains and well heads with many designs for free-standing fountains. The fourth part includes designs for grottoes and garden pavilions. In 1661, Böckler wrote Theatrum Machinarum Novum, an important work on windmills, pumps and other hydraulic machines. Böckler died in Ansbach. His brother Johann Heinrich Boeckler was a polymath.

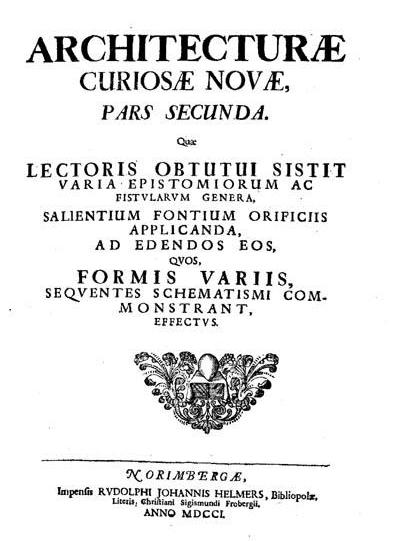
Neue Ergötzliche Sinn-und Kunstreiche auch nützliche Bau-und Wasser-Kunst vorstellend (1701)
