= Dodecatemoria =

Subdivision of signs into 12 sub parts

Zodiac chart with dodecatemoria shown within the sign of Aries

Dodecatemoria are subdivisions of the twelve signs of the Zodiac into a further twelve parts each. These can be said to form a "micro-zodiac" of 144 dodecatemoria, each corresponding to 2.5° of the ecliptic. In an alternate usage, the dodecamorion refers to a point on the ecliptic reached by the addition of twelve times a given number of degrees within a sign, either to the original degree, or to the beginning of the sign.

This system, used in Hellenistic astrology but less favored by later ages, apparently originated in Babylonian astrology.

== Name ==
The name "dodecatemoria" is a Latinization of the Greek δωδεκατημόρια (singular Gr. δωδεκατημόριον, L. "dodecatemorium" or dodecatemorion). The same concept is expressed by Hebrew: השנים עשר or התריסר in Hebrew and by اثنا عشرية in Arabic.

The Babylonians used the word 𒄩𒆷 (ḪA-LA), pronounced zittu, defined as "share" and "part". Assyriologists call this system the "microzodiac".

== Calculation ==
Within each sign, the dodecatemoria are arranged beginning with the sign itself and proceeding in the normal order. Thus, the first dodecatemorion in Virgo is Virgo and the last is Leo.

=== Hellenistic computation ===
Let T be a point at degree D of sign S. Add 12×D degrees to the beginning of sign S.

For example, to find the dodecatemorion of Capricorn 17, multiply 17 by 12 to get 204, and move 204° past the beginning of Capricorn. One arrives at Cancer 24. Cancer is the seventh dodecatemorion of Capricorn, corresponding to Capricorn 15–17.5°. At the same time, Cancer 24 can be given as the exact "dodecatemorion" of Capricorn 17.

In Manilius's Astronomica the dodecatemoria are further subdivided into five half-degree parts, each corresponding to a planet.

=== Babylonian computation ===
In an alternative and seemingly older Mesopotamian system, the dodecatemorion of a point in the heavens is computed by adding the degree multiplied twelvefold not to 0° of its sign but to the exact degree in question.

In symbolic terms: Let T be a point at degree D of sign S. Add 12×D degrees to D. Or, equivalently, add 13×D to S.

The result is a micro-zodiac of thirteen sections, with the first and thirteenth identical, and 13° movement per day.

Date		Position	
Month	Day	Sign	Degree
1	1	1	13
1	2	1	26
1	3	2	9
1	4	2	22
1	5	3	5

== History ==
Cuneiform tablets from Babylon, possibly originating under the period of the Achaemenid Empire (539–331), describe the system of multiplying by 12 to find the dodecatemorion associated with a degree.

The earliest possible date for the use of the Babylonian microzodiac is naturally constrained by the earliest possible date for the zodiac itself, generally given as circa the fifth century BC.

The Babylonian system was apparently adopted by the Greeks, who frequently attributed astrological knowledge to Chaldeans or Egyptians. The Latin authors Manilius and Firmicus both describe calculations of dodecatemoria. Ptolemy in the Tetrabiblos, however, dismissed the computation of dodecatemoria as illogical.

Abraham Ibn Ezra, a Hebrew scholar writing in the twelfth century AD, described two systems. In one system, attributed to Egyptian scientists and gentiles, a sign of 30° is subdivided into 12 sections of 2.5°, corresponding to a sequence of the seven heavenly bodies, with repetitions. In the other, attributed to Enoch and the Ancients, each degree within a sign corresponds with one of the twelve signs, starting with the sign itself. In the latter system, the cycle repeats two and a half times within each sign; for example, the dodecatemoria of Libra would begin with Libra in the first degree and return to Libra at 13° and 25°.

== Purpose ==
Computation of dodecatemoria could have helped the ancient astronomer by, simply, giving him more symbolic data to interpret.

The dodecatemoria could also crudely represent the motion of the moon across the ecliptic during the course of one month. Possibly they use a "virtual moon", imagined conjunct with the Sun (i.e., new) at the beginning of a sign, to symbolize divisions within the sign.

A Greek text (found in two existing codicies) connects the dodecatemoria with the homo signorum ("Zodiac Man") in which zodiacal signs are allocated evenly across the body from Aries at the head to Pisces at the feet. In this text, body parts are listed alongside degree numbers 2, 5, 7, 10, etc., corresponding to increments of 2.5° rounded down. The order of body parts modifies the usual list to accommodate the special characteristics of the sign; for example, most of the animal signs have "tail" as their final part, while Scorpio has "sting", and the list in Gemini and Pisces is doubled.

Like the 12-part zodiac, division of the signs into body parts (equated at some point with the signs) could have allowed ancient astronomers to describe parts of the sky (and record observations of celestial bodies located therein) with greater precision and convenience. Late Babylonian texts also give rising times for dodecatemoria during the course of a single day.

== Kalendertexte ==
The data used for the Babylonian computation of dodecatemoria, inverted and re-sorted, result in a scheme known as Kalendertexte (or Calendar Text), also used by Mesopotamian astrologers in the first millennium BC.

Position		Date	
Sign	Degree	Month	Date
1	1	1	13
1	2	1	26
1	3	2	9
1	4	2	22
1	5	3	5

When sorted by day—as the data apparently are on tablets from Babylon, Borsippa, and Uruk c. 5th–4th centuries BC—the result describes a progression of 277° per day.

Position		Date	
Sign	Degree	Month	Date
10	7	1	1
7	14	1	2
4	21	1	3
1	28	1	4
11	5	1	5

== See also ==
- Decans
- Varga (astrology)
- Bees
