= Johann Heinrich Boeckler =

German historian and polymath (1611-1672)

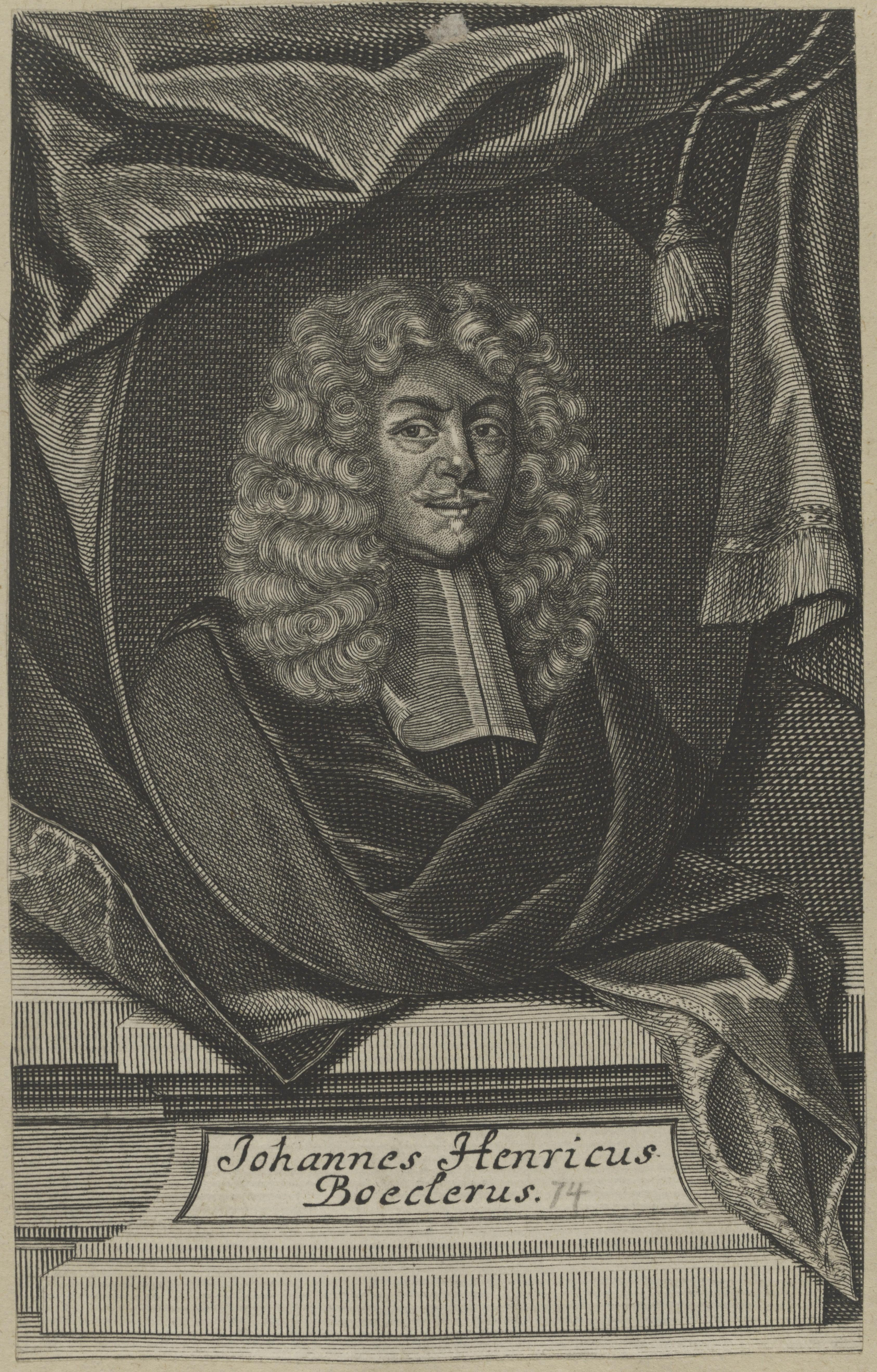
Polymath Johann Heinrich Boeckler

Johann Heinrich Boeckler (13 December 1611 in Cronheim – 12 September 1672 in Strassburg) was a German polymath.

Born in Cronheim as a son of the Protestant priest Johann Boeckler and Magda Summer, he was a polymath at the University in Strassburg. He was the brother of the architect Georg Andreas Boeckler who also became famous with his publication Architectura Curiosa Nova. 1649 Queen Christina of Sweden invited Johann Heinrich to teach at the University in Uppsala. In 1650 he was graduated Swedish state historian. In 1654 he returned as a professor to the University of Strassburg.

== Publications (selection) ==
- Orationes duae. I. de C. Taciti Historia, II. de Tiberii Caesaris principatu. Straßburg 1636
- Historia schola principum. 1640
- In C. Corn. Taciti quinque libros histor. annotatio politica. Straßburg 1648
- Disseratio De Notitia Reipublicae, Ad C: Corn. Taciti lib. IV, 33. Uppsala 1649. (Digitalisat in der Digitalen Bibliothek Mecklenburg-Vorpommern)
- Nomima tōn Aigyptiōn, sive leges Aegyptiorum., 1657
- Iosephus Philonis, sive bios politiku, vita viri civilis., 1660
- In Hugonis Grotii Ius Belli Et Pacis, Ad Illustrißimum Baronem Boineburgium Commentatio Jo. Henrici Boecleri. Straßburg 1663/1664
- Elogium Christophori Forstneri. 1669
- Collegium politicae posthumum. Oder polit. Discourse von 1. Verbesserung Land und Leuth, 2. Anrichtung guter Policey, 3. Erledigung grosser Ausgaaben, und 4. eines jeden Regenten jährlichen Gefäll und Einkommen. Anno (editori Magisteriali) 1669. zu Strassburg von dem weitberühmten JCto, und der Rechten Professore, Hn. J. Heinr. Böcklern, nun aber zu geminem Besten publicè andas Liecht gebracht, und zum Druck befördert. o.O., o.J. [wohl Straßburg 1670]
- Bibliographia historico-politico-philologica curiosa. Leipzig 1677
- Joh. Henrici Boecleri kurtze Anweisung, wie man die Authores classicos bey und mit der Jugend tractiren soll. So auch desselben dissertatio epistolica postrema de Studio politico bene instituendo. Straßburg 1680
- Institutiones politicae. 1704
- Joh. Heinrici Boecleri Viri Celeberrimi Libellus Memorialis Ethicus, 1712
- Theses Juridicae de testamentis solemnibus et minus solemnibus. 1720
