= Lorenzo Bonincontri =

Italian astrologer, humanist and historian

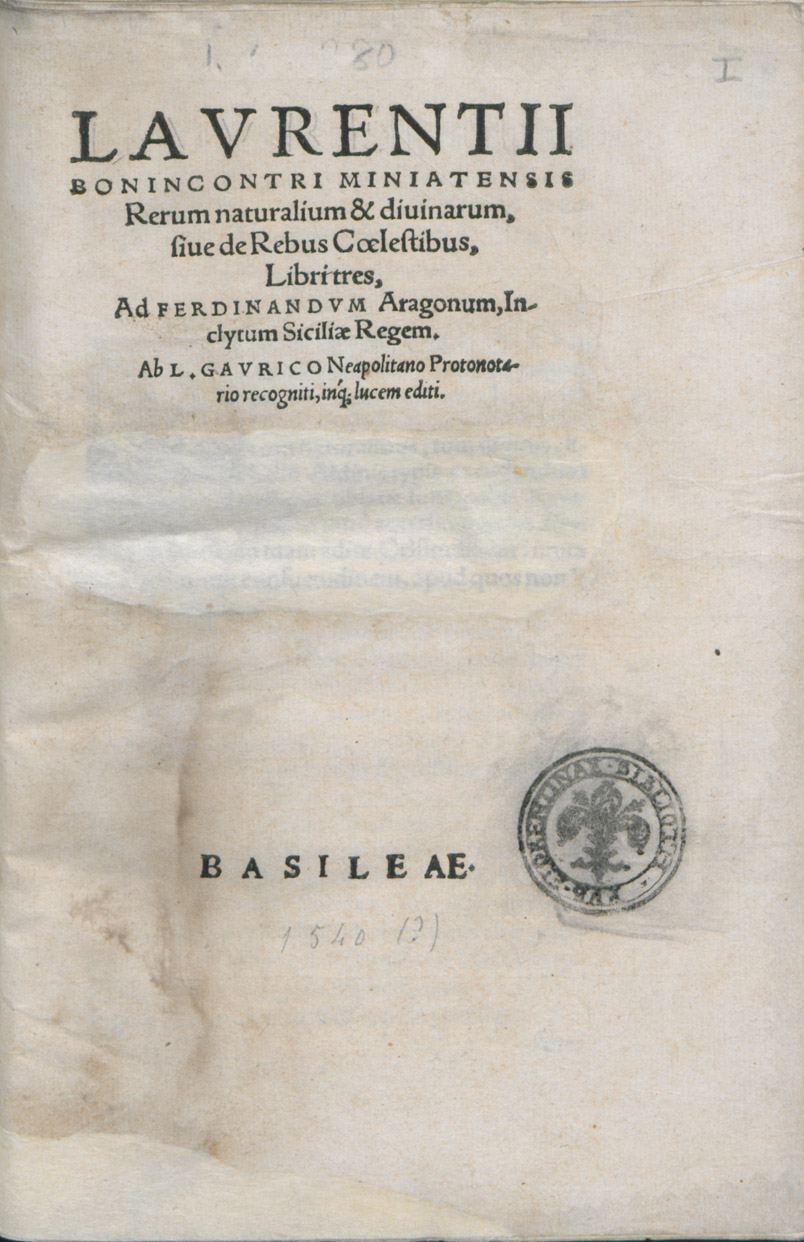
De rebus coelestibus, 1540

Lorenzo Bonincontri, or Bonincontro, Latinized as Laurentius Bonincontrius (23 February 1410 - 1491), was an Italian astrologer, humanist and historian of the 15th century.

== Life ==
He was born in 1410 in San Miniato.

He lived in different cities in Italy: Naples (1450–75), Florence (1475–78) and Rome (1483–91), where he wrote part of his work.

He probably died in 1491 in Rome.

== Works ==
- Rerum naturalium libri, Naples, 1469–1472. Poem in Latin hexameters.
- De rebus coelestibus, aureum opusculum, 1472–1475. Poem in three books of filosofic-astrologic topic dedicated to Ferdinand II of Aragon.
  - De rebus coelestibus, Gaurico, Venice, 1526
  - De rebus coelestibus. Basel. 1540 – via Robert Winter.
- Chronicon (chronicle from 903 to 1458)
- De ortu Regum Neapolitanorum (or Historia utriusque Siciliae), in 10 books, Florence, 1739–1740. History of the kings of Naples and Sicily.
