= Astrological symbols =

Symbols denoting astrological concepts

Historically, astrological and astronomical symbols have overlapped. Frequently used symbols include signs of the zodiac, planets, asteroids, and other celestial bodies. These originate from medieval Byzantine codices. Their current form is a product of the European Renaissance. Other symbols for astrological aspects are used in various astrological traditions.

== History and origin ==
Symbols for the classical planets, zodiac signs, aspects, lots, and the lunar nodes appear in the medieval Byzantine codices in which many ancient horoscopes were preserved. In the original Greek horoscope papyri, the Sun was depicted by a circle bearing the ancient glyph for radiance, while the Moon was symbolized by a crescent.

=== Classical planets ===
The written symbols for Mercury, Venus, Jupiter, and Saturn have been traced to forms found in late Classical Greek papyri. The symbols for Jupiter and Saturn are monograms of the initial letters of the corresponding Greek names, and the symbol for Mercury is a stylized caduceus. Annie S. D. Maunder finds antecedents of the planetary symbols in earlier sources, used to represent the gods associated with the classical planets. Bianchini's planisphere, produced in the 2nd century, shows Greek personifications of planetary gods charged with early versions of the planetary symbols: Mercury has a caduceus; Venus has, attached to her necklace, a cord connected to another necklace; Mars, a spear; Jupiter, a staff; Saturn, a scythe; the Sun, a circlet with rays radiating from it; and the Moon, a headdress with a crescent attached. A diagram in Johannes Kamateros' 12th-century Compendium of Astrology shows the Sun represented by the circle with a ray, Jupiter by the letter zeta (the initial of Zeus, Jupiter's counterpart in Greek mythology), Mars by a shield crossed by a spear, and the remaining classical planets by symbols resembling the modern ones, without the cross-mark seen in modern versions of the symbols.

The modern sun symbol, pictured as a circle with a dot (U+2609 ☉ SUN), first appeared in the Renaissance. (The conventional symbols for the signs of the zodiac also develop in the Renaissance period as simplifications of the classical pictorial representations of the signs.)

The modern sun symbol resembles the Egyptian hieroglyph for "sun" – a circle that sometimes had a dot in the center, (U+131F3 𓇳 EGYPTIAN HIEROGLYPH N005). Similar in appearance were several variants of the ancestral form of the modern Chinese logograph for "sun", which in the oracle bone script and bronze script were. It is not known if the Egyptian and Chinese logographs have any connection to the European astrological symbol.

=== Major planets discovered in the modern era ===
Symbols for Uranus, Neptune and Pluto were created shortly after their discovery. For Uranus, two variant symbols are seen. One symbol,, invented by J. G. Köhler and refined by Bode, was intended to represent the newly discovered metal platinum; since platinum, sometimes described as white gold (Note: Today, white gold means a silvery alloy of gold mixed with another metal, usually nickel, silver, or both.) was found by chemists mixed with iron, the symbol for platinum combines the alchemical symbols for iron, ♂, and gold, ☉. An inverted version of that same symbol, was in use in the early 20th century. Another symbol,, was suggested by Jérôme Lalande in 1784. In a letter to William Herschel, Lalande described it as "a globe surmounted by the first letter of your name" (French: un globe surmonté par la première lettre de votre nom). After Neptune was discovered, the Bureau des Longitudes proposed the name Neptune and the familiar trident for the planet's symbol, though at bottom may be either a cross or an orb. Pluto, like Uranus, has multiple symbols in use. One symbol, ♇, is a monogram of the letters PL (which can be interpreted to stand for Pluto or for astronomer Percival Lowell), was announced with the name of the new planet by the discoverers on May 1, 1930. Another symbol, popularized in Paul Clancy's American Astrology magazine, is based on Pluto's bident:.

=== Asteroids ===
The astrological symbols for the first four objects discovered at the beginning of the 19th century — Ceres, Pallas, Juno and Vesta — were created shortly after their discoveries. They were initially listed as planets, and half a century later came to be called asteroids, though such "minor planets" continued to be considered planets for perhaps another century. Shortly after Giuseppe Piazzi's discovery of Ceres, a group of astronomers ratified the name, proposed by the discoverer, and chose the sickle as a symbol of the planet. The symbol for Pallas, the spear of Pallas Athena, was invented by Baron Franz Xaver von Zach, and introduced in his Monatliche Correspondenz zur Beförderung der Erd- und Himmels-Kunde. Karl Ludwig Harding, who discovered and named Juno, assigned to it the symbol of a scepter topped with a star.

The modern astrological form of the symbol for Vesta, ⚶, was created by Eleanor Bach, who is credited with pioneering the use of the big four asteroids with the publication of her Ephemerides of the Asteroids in the early 1970s. The original form of the symbol for Vesta,, was created by German mathematician Carl Friedrich Gauss. Olbers, having previously discovered and named one new planet (as the asteroids were then classified), gave Gauss the honor of naming his newest discovery. Gauss decided to name the planet for the goddess Vesta, and also specified that the symbol should be the altar of the goddess with the sacred fire burning on it. Bach's variant is a simplification of 19th-century elaborations of Gauss's altar symbol.

=== Centaurs ===
The symbol for the centaur Chiron, ⚷, is both a key and a monogram of the letters O and K (for 'Object Kowal', a provisional name of the object, for discoverer Charles T. Kowal) was proposed by astrologer Al Morrison, who presented the symbol as "an inspiration shared amongst Al H. Morrison, Joelle K.D. Mahoney, and Marlene Bassoff."

A widely used convention for other centaurs, proposed by Robert von Heeren in the 1990s, is to replace the K of the Chiron key glyph with the initial letter of the object: e.g. P or φ for Pholus and N for Nessus (U+2BDB ⯛ PHOLUS, U+2BDC ⯜ NESSUS).

=== Other trans-Neptunian objects ===
Symbols for other large trans-Neptunian objects have mostly been proposed on the Internet; some created by Denis Moskowitz have been used by NASA and are used by the popular open-source astrological software Astrolog, as well as being used less consistently by commercial programs.

=== Miscellaneous orbital stations ===
The symbol for retrograde motion is ℞, a capital 'R' with a tail stroke. An 'R' with a tail stroke was used to abbreviate many words beginning with the letter 'R'; in medical prescriptions, it abbreviated the word recipe (from the Latin imperative of recipere "to take"), and in missals, an R with a tail stroke marked the responses.

== Meanings of the symbols ==
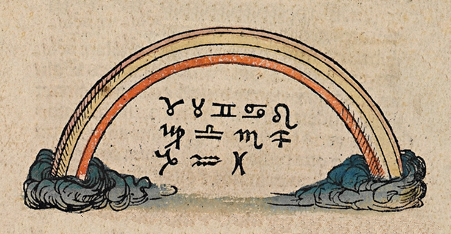
A late-15th-century manuscript with the twelve zodiac symbols. Note the flat Cancer, upright Sagittarius and cursive Capricorn.

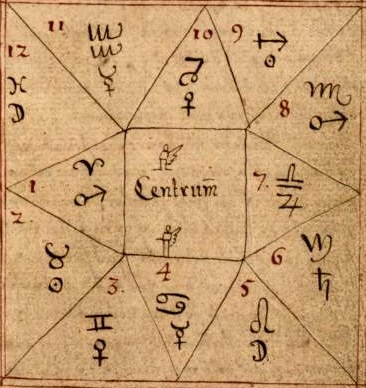
A mid-18th-century manuscript with symbols for the signs and planets. Note the distinctive shapes of Virgo (6), Scorpio (8), Capricorn (10) and Aquarius (11).

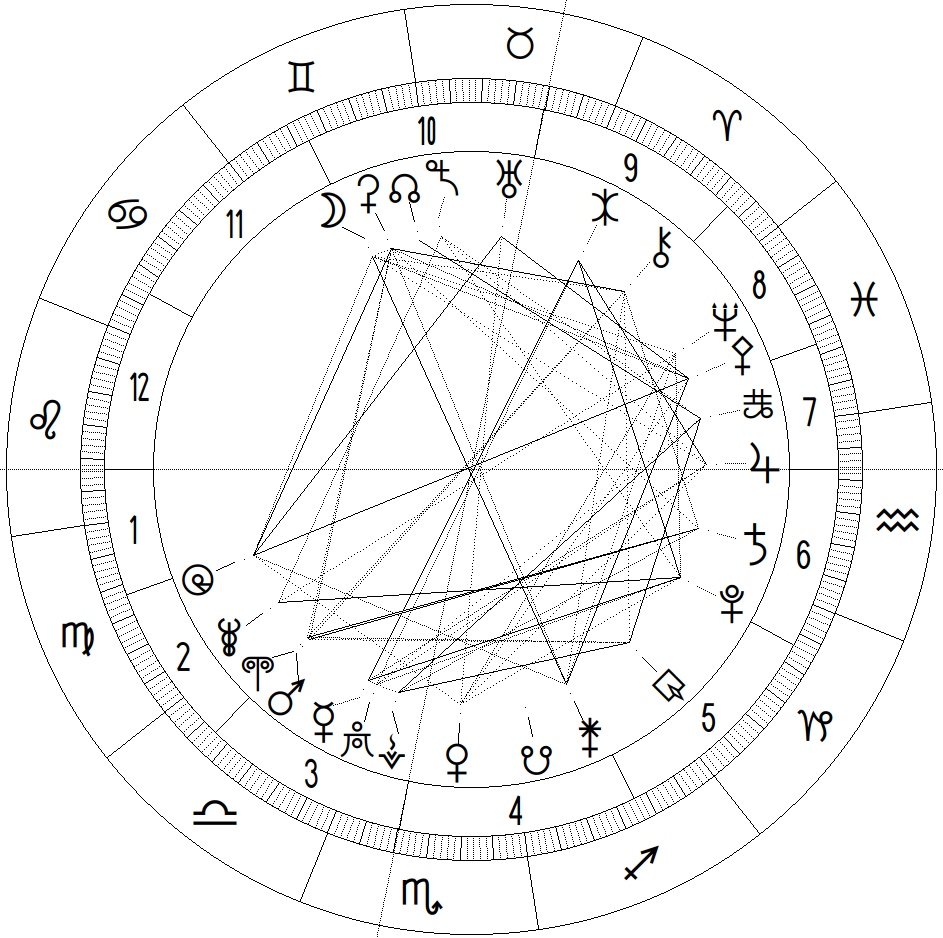
A wheel chart produced by Astrolog, showing symbols for the signs of the zodiac (outer ring), classical planets, dwarf planets and asteroids (inner ring). In the inner ring, clockwise from Gemini, are the Moon, Ceres, ascending node, Sedna, Uranus, Eris, Chiron, Neptune, Pallas, Gonggong, Jupiter, Saturn, Pluto, Quaoar, Juno, descending node, Venus, Vesta, Haumea, Mercury, Mars, Makemake, Hygiea and Orcus.

=== Signs of the zodiac ===
Name	Meaning	Image	Text (Note: Text format can be forced by appending the character U+FE0E to the sign)	Emoji (Note: Emoji format can be forced by appending the character U+FE0F to the sign)	Unicode	Symbol represents
Aries	Ram		♈︎	♈️	U+2648	Face and horns of a ram
Taurus	Bull		♉︎	♉️	U+2649	Face and horns of a bull
Gemini	Twinned		♊︎	♊️	U+264A	Twins
Cancer	Crab		♋︎	♋️	U+264B	Two arms/pincers of a crab. May have derived from a scarab beetle in the Demotic script
Leo	Lion		♌︎	♌️	U+264C	A lion's head and tail.
Virgo	Maiden		♍︎	♍️	U+264D	Derived from the Greek letters ΠΑΡ, an abbreviation of parthenos "virgin". May have derived from a seated woman in the Demotic script
Libra	Scales		♎︎	♎️	U+264E	Weighing scale. Libra is associated with the scales by the Babylonians, the claws of Scorpio by the Greeks, and the scales again by the Romans
Scorpio	Scorpion		♏︎	♏️	U+264F	Scorpion with stinging tail
Sagittarius	Archer		♐︎	♐️	U+2650	Bow and arrow of a centaur
Capricorn	Goat-horned		♑︎	♑️	U+2651	Head and forequarters of a goat with the hindquarters and tail of a fish
Aquarius	Water-carrier		♒︎	♒️	U+2652	Ripples of water
Pisces	Fishes		♓︎	♓️	U+2653	Two fish

=== Planets ===
Name	Image	Browser	Unicode	Symbol represents
Sun	Sol	☉	U+2609	Apollo's shield with a boss
Moon	Crescent moon	☽	U+263D	A crescent moon
Moon	Decrescent moon	☾	U+263E	A crescent moon
Mercury	Mercury	☿	U+263F	Mercury's caduceus; the cross-bar was added sometime after the 11th century. (Note: The bars were stereotyped, but not yet standardized by the early 16th century as can be seen when comparing the woodcuts from Abu Masar's 1506 a.d. "Great Introductions" and the 1550 a.d. Anecdotum Parisinum. Mercury has two bars in the former but only one in the latter. Venus has a bar in the former but none in the latter. Jupiter has a vertical bar in both, and Saturn has a new horizontal bar in both. Mars doesn't have a bar because it would turn his spear into an arrow.)
Venus	Venus	♀	U+2640	Venus's copper hand mirror with handle or necklace with pendant. The cross-bar was added sometime after the 11th century.
Mars	Mars	♂	U+2642	Mars' shield and spear. The shield did not appear in early papyrus, and the original symbol is perhaps unrelated to the spear. (the 481 a.d. papyrus (P.Oxy. 4274) looks more like an Α with its middle stroke extended diagonally, and the 508 a.d. papyrus (P.Oxy. 4275) looks more like the characteristic spear. Jones implied but did not explicitly claim it was a monogram-abbreviation)
Jupiter	Jupiter	♃	U+2643	Monogram Ζ for Zeus with an originally horizontal cross-bar indicating an abbreviation.
Saturn	Saturn	♄	U+2644	κρ for Cronus with a cross-bar indicating an abbreviation. The bar was originally on the bottom of ρ (as seen on the 376 a.d. papyrus (P.Oxy. 4272)) but was later lost (as seen on the 481 a.d. papyrus (P.Oxy. 4274)). The new cross-bar was added sometime after the 11th century.
Uranus	Uranus	♅	U+2645	An orb with a monogram H for the discoverer's last name, William Herschel
Uranus	Uranus	⛢	U+26E2	Derived from the alchemical symbols of the planetary metals gold (Sun) and iron (Mars) to create a symbol for platinum, then applied to the planet
Neptune	Neptune	♆	U+2646	Neptune's trident
Pluto	Pluto (bident symbol)	⯓	U+2BD3	Pluto's orb and a bident
Pluto	Pluto (PL monogram)	♇	U+2647	PL monogram for Pluto and Percival Lowell
Pluto	Pluto	⯔	U+2BD4	Symbol used mainly in France, Spain, Italy, and Germany.
Pluto	Pluto	⯕	U+2BD5	Symbol invented by German astrologer Hermann Lefeldt in 1946. Used by some followers of the Hamburg School of Astrology. Also proposed for Pluto's moon Charon.
Pluto	Pluto	⯖	U+2BD6	Pluto's orbit crossing that of Neptune. Symbol mostly used in German-speaking countries and Denmark.

=== Asteroids and other celestial bodies ===
Since the 1970s, some astrologers have used asteroids and other celestial bodies in their horoscopes. The symbol for the first-recognised centaur, 2060 Chiron, was devised by Al H. Morrison soon after it had been discovered by Charles Kowal, and has become standard amongst astrologers. In the late 1990s, German astrologer Robert von Heeren created symbols for other centaurs based on the Chiron model, though only those for 5145 Pholus and 7066 Nessus are included in Unicode, and only that for Pholus in Astrolog. The following list is by no means exhaustive, but for bodies outside this list, there is often very little to no independent usage beyond the symbols' creators.

Category	Name	Image	Browser	Unicode	Symbol represents
Asteroids	Ceres	Ceres	⚳	U+26B3	A scythe (handle down), emblematic of Ceres as goddess of the harvest
Asteroids	Pallas	Pallas	⚴	U+26B4	A spear, emblematic of Athena
Asteroids	Juno	Juno	⚵	U+26B5	A scepter, emblematic of Juno as queen of the gods, topped with a star
Asteroids	Vesta	Vesta	⚶	U+26B6	The fire-altar of Vesta's temple
Asteroids	Astraea		%, ⯙	U+0025, U+2BD9	The % sign (shift-5 on the keyboard for asteroid 5)
Asteroids	Hygiea	Hygiea	⯚	U+2BDA	A caduceus (an apparent error for the rod of Asclepius, itself an error for the snake as a symbol of Hygieia)
Centaurs	Chiron	Chiron	⚷	U+26B7	Stylized key; simultaneously the letters OK for "Object Kowal", as the object was known when announced as a new planet. The top is half of a "perfect X", with the staff rising above so that they're radii of a circle centered where they meet. The width and height of the oval are the golden ratio.
Centaurs	Pholus		⯛	U+2BDB	Symbols devised by German astrologer Robert von Heeren in the late 1990s, based on Chiron's
Centaurs	Nessus		⯜	U+2BDC	Symbols devised by German astrologer Robert von Heeren in the late 1990s, based on Chiron's
Centaurs	Chariklo				Symbols devised by German astrologer Robert von Heeren in the late 1990s, based on Chiron's
Centaurs	Hylonome				Symbols devised by German astrologer Robert von Heeren in the late 1990s, based on Chiron's
Centaurs	Cyllarus				Symbols devised by German astrologer Robert von Heeren in the late 1990s, based on Chiron's
Large trans-Neptunian planetoids, incl. dwarf planets	Eris	Eris	⯰	U+2BF0	The Hand of Eris; also used non-astrologically by Discordians
Large trans-Neptunian planetoids, incl. dwarf planets	Eris	Eris	⯱	U+2BF1	Based on the symbols for Pluto, Mars, and Venus; proposed by Henry Seltzer and used in Time Passages
Large trans-Neptunian planetoids, incl. dwarf planets	Haumea	Haumea	🝻	U+1F77B	Conflation of Hawaiian petroglyphs for woman and birth, as Haumea was the goddess of both
Large trans-Neptunian planetoids, incl. dwarf planets	Makemake	Makemake	🝼	U+1F77C	Engraved face of the Rapa Nui god Makemake, also resembling an M
Large trans-Neptunian planetoids, incl. dwarf planets	Gonggong	Gonggong	🝽	U+1F77D	Chinese character 共 gòng (the first character in Gonggong's name), combined with a snake's tail
Large trans-Neptunian planetoids, incl. dwarf planets	Sedna	Sedna	⯲	U+2BF2	Monogram of the Inuktitut syllabics for 'sa' and 'n', as Sedna's Inuit name is 'Sanna' (ᓴᓐᓇ)
Large trans-Neptunian planetoids, incl. dwarf planets	Quaoar	Quaoar	🝾	U+1F77E	A Q for Quaoar combined with a canoe, stylised to resemble the angular rock art of the Tongva
Large trans-Neptunian planetoids, incl. dwarf planets	Orcus	Orcus	🝿	U+1F77F	An O-R monogram for Orcus, stylised to resemble a skull and an orca's grin
Large trans-Neptunian planetoids, incl. dwarf planets	Orcus	Orcus Anti-Pluto			Inverted Pluto, from Orcus being styled the 'anti-Pluto'
Large trans-Neptunian planetoids, incl. dwarf planets	Salacia	Salacia			A stylized hippocamp
Large trans-Neptunian planetoids, incl. dwarf planets	Salacia	Salacia			A stylized hippocamp
Large trans-Neptunian planetoids, incl. dwarf planets	Varda	Varda	❈	U+2748	A gleaming star, as Varda was creator of the stars
Large trans-Neptunian planetoids, incl. dwarf planets	Ixion	Ixion			Ixion of Greek mythology lying on the Solar wheel to which Zeus had bound him in Tartarus
Large trans-Neptunian planetoids, incl. dwarf planets	Ixion	Ixion			The solar wheel that Zeus bound Ixion to in Tartarus, with the spokes stylized as an I-X for 'Ixion'
Large trans-Neptunian planetoids, incl. dwarf planets	Ixion	Ixion			Based on the preceding, but with the Greek letters Ι Ξ for Ιξιων in place of Latin I and X.
Large trans-Neptunian planetoids, incl. dwarf planets	Varuna	Varuna			Devanagari व va and Varuna's snake-lasso.
Large trans-Neptunian planetoids, incl. dwarf planets	Gǃkúnǁʼhòmdímà	Gǃkúnǁʼhòmdímà			An aardvark, representing the beautiful aardvark girl Gǃkúnǁʼhòmdímà
Large trans-Neptunian planetoids, incl. dwarf planets	Gǃkúnǁʼhòmdímà	Gǃkúnǁʼhòmdímà			An aardvark, representing the beautiful aardvark girl Gǃkúnǁʼhòmdímà
Large trans-Neptunian planetoids, incl. dwarf planets	Typhon	Typhon	🌀︎	U+1F300	Simplified representation of a hurricane, as in Greek mythology Typhon was a divine monster that could create hurricanes with his wings
Large trans-Neptunian planetoids, incl. dwarf planets	Chaos	Chaos			Arrows pointing in all directions; the symbol of Chaos
Large trans-Neptunian planetoids, incl. dwarf planets	Rhadamanthus	Rhadamanthus			Unknown
Fictitious planets	Proserpina		⯘	U+2BD8	Object and symbol are unrelated to the asteroid 26 Proserpina.
Fictitious planets	Proserpina	Proserpina	♁	U+2641	Symbol used for Proserpina and apparent synonym Kora by astrologers in Poland, and the astrology software Urania, who identify Proserpina with the dwarf planet Eris.
Fictitious planets	Transpluto		⯗	U+2BD7	Fictitious planet beyond Pluto (arrow pointing beyond Pluto's orbit)
Fictitious planets	Cupido	Cupido	⯠	U+2BE0	The Hamburg School of Astrology, also called Uranian Astrology, adds eight fictitious trans-Neptunian planets to the normal ones used by western astrologers.
Fictitious planets	Hades	Hades	⯡	U+2BE1	The Hamburg School of Astrology, also called Uranian Astrology, adds eight fictitious trans-Neptunian planets to the normal ones used by western astrologers.
Fictitious planets	Zeus	Zeus	⯢	U+2BE2	The Hamburg School of Astrology, also called Uranian Astrology, adds eight fictitious trans-Neptunian planets to the normal ones used by western astrologers.
Fictitious planets	Kronos	Kronos	⯣	U+2BE3	The Hamburg School of Astrology, also called Uranian Astrology, adds eight fictitious trans-Neptunian planets to the normal ones used by western astrologers.
Fictitious planets	Apollon	Apollon	⯤	U+2BE4	The Hamburg School of Astrology, also called Uranian Astrology, adds eight fictitious trans-Neptunian planets to the normal ones used by western astrologers.
Fictitious planets	Admetos	Admetos	⯥	U+2BE5	The Hamburg School of Astrology, also called Uranian Astrology, adds eight fictitious trans-Neptunian planets to the normal ones used by western astrologers.
Fictitious planets	Vulcanus	Vulcanus	⯦	U+2BE6	The Hamburg School of Astrology, also called Uranian Astrology, adds eight fictitious trans-Neptunian planets to the normal ones used by western astrologers.
Fictitious planets	Poseidon	Poseidon	⯧	U+2BE7	The Hamburg School of Astrology, also called Uranian Astrology, adds eight fictitious trans-Neptunian planets to the normal ones used by western astrologers.

=== Aspects ===
In astrology, an aspect is an angle the planets make to each other in the horoscope, also to the ascendant, midheaven, descendant, lower midheaven, and other points of astrological interest. The following symbols are used to note aspect:

Name	Image	Browser	Unicode	Angle	Ratio	Explanation
Conjunction		☌	U+260C	0°	-	Two or more planets in the same house (zodiacal sign). A circle with a line implying two objects are aligned (or, the starting point of an angle)
Vigintile	V	V	U+0056	18°	20	Also known as semidecile.
Vigintile	SD	SD	U+0053 U+0044	18°	20	Also known as semidecile.
Semisextile		⚺	U+26BA	30°	12	One sign apart The intersecting lines from the inner angles of the upper half of a hexagon (see Sextile). Also known as dodecile.
Undecile	U	U	U+0055	32.73°	11	
Decile	D	D	U+0044	36°	10	
Decile		⊥	U+22A5	36°	10	
Novile	N	N	U+004E	40°	9	Also known as nonile.
Semi-square		∠	U+2220	45°	8	Half the angle of Square. Also known as semiquartile and octile. The symbol was originally an 'L' shape (half a square), now commonly an acute angle, though not actually drawn as a 45° angle.
Septile	S	S	U+0053	51.43°	7	
Sextile		⚹	U+26B9	60°	6	Two signs apart The intersecting lines from the inner angles of a hexagon
Quintile	Q	Q	U+0051	72°	5	
Quintile		⬠	U+2B20	72°	5	
Binovile	N^{2}	N^{2}	U+004E U+00B2	80°	9/2	Also known as binonile.
Square		□	U+25A1	90°	4	Three signs apart / Same modality A regular quadrilateral that represents the right angle. Also known as quartile.
Biseptile	S^{2}	S^{2}	U+0053 U+00B2	102.86°	7/2	
Tredecile	D^{3}	D^{3}	U+0044 U+00B3	108°	10/3	Also known as tridecile.
Tredecile		∓	U+2213	108°	10/3	Also known as tridecile.
Trine		△	U+25B3	120°	3	Four signs apart / Same elemental triplicity An equilateral triangle. Also known as trinovile.
Sesquiquadrate		⚼	U+26BC	135°	8/3	The glyph of the Semi-Square under the glyph of the Square, implying the sum of them both. Also known as the sesquisquare, square-and-a-half, and trioctile.
Biquintile	Q^{2}	Q^{2}	U+0051 U+00B2	144°	5/2	
Biquintile	bQ	bQ	U+0062 U+0051	144°	5/2	
Biquintile		±	U+00B1	144°	5/2	
Quincunx		⚻	U+26BB	150°	12/5	Five signs apart The intersecting lines from the inner angles of the lower half of a hexagon (see Sextile). Also known as the inconjunct.
Triseptile	S^{3}	S^{3}	U+0053 U+00B3	154.29°	7/3	Also known as tridecile.
Quadranovile	N^{4}	N^{4}	U+004E U+2074	160°	9/4	Also known as quadnovile and quadranonile.
Opposition		☍	U+260D	180°	2	Six signs apart The glyph of the Conjunction plus a circle on top of its line, implying two objects are opposed.
Occultation		🝵	U+1F775	0°		Conjunction with eclipse. Solar eclipse when the Sun and Moon are in conjunction. Less commonly used for the Moon eclipsing any of the planets, as opposed to a mere conjunction, or for any of the planets and their moons eclipsing each other.
Lunar eclipse		🝶	U+1F776	180°		Opposition with eclipse, or (rarely) any body in the shadow of the other. Lunar eclipse when the Sun and Moon are in opposition.

Russian aspects

In addition to the aspect symbols above, some Russian astrologers use additional or unique aspect symbols:

Name	Image	Browser	Unicode	Angle
Vigintile		⯳	U+2BF3	18°
Novile		⯴	U+2BF4	40°
Quintile		⯵	U+2BF5	72°
Binovile		⯶	U+2BF6	80°
Centile (Sentagon)		⯷	U+2BF7	100°
Tredecile		⯸	U+2BF8	108°

=== Miscellaneous symbols ===
Category	Name	Image	Browser	Unicode	Explanation
Angle	Ascendant	A^{sc}	A^{sc}		The ascendant (also known as the "ascensum coeli") is the rising intersection of the ecliptic with the celestial horizon at a particular moment in time; it is used in the construction of a horoscope/natal chart
Angle	Midheaven	M^{c}	M^{c}		The midheaven (also known as the "medium coeli") is the point where the ecliptic crosses the local meridian; it is used in the construction of a horoscope/natal chart
Angle	Vertex	Vx or	Vx or 🜊	U+1F70A	The vertex and anti-vertex are the points where the prime vertical intersects the ecliptic. A crucible symbol, 🜊, is used by Astrolog and the HamburgSymbols font
Apparent retrograde motion	Retrograde motion	℞	℞	U+211E	Symbol represents the apparent retrograde motion of a planet in an astrological chart
Lunar node	Ascending Node		☊	U+260A	Not all astrologers use the lunar nodes; however, their usage is very important in Vedic astrology. They are alternately known as the "Dragon's Head" (Rahu, Caput Draconis, or Anabibazon) and the "Dragon's Tail" (Ketu, Cauda Draconis, or Catabibazon). The two nodes together are most commonly referred to simply as the nodal axis, the lunar nodes, or the Moon's nodes.
Lunar node	Descending Node		☋	U+260B	Not all astrologers use the lunar nodes; however, their usage is very important in Vedic astrology. They are alternately known as the "Dragon's Head" (Rahu, Caput Draconis, or Anabibazon) and the "Dragon's Tail" (Ketu, Cauda Draconis, or Catabibazon). The two nodes together are most commonly referred to simply as the nodal axis, the lunar nodes, or the Moon's nodes.
Lunar apogee	Black Moon, or Lilith		⚸	U+26B8	The original Black Moon was a fictitious second, very dark moon of Earth. It is now often re-interpreted as the position of the mean lunar apogee as measured from the geocenter; variants of the Black Moon include replacing the mean orbit with a "true" osculating orbit or with an interpolated orbit; charting the empty focus of the Moon's orbit instead of the apogee; and measuring the desired point's barycentric or topocentric position instead of its geocentric position.
Lunar apogee	True Black Moon		⯞	U+2BDE	The lunar apogee calculated from its current position (disregarding solar perturbation), as opposed to its mean position.
symbols related to Lilith	White Moon, or Selena		⯝	U+2BDD	Russian astrologer Pavel Globa invented this to serve as the symbolic opposite of the Black Moon in the 1980s.
symbols related to Lilith	True White Moon, or Arta		⯟	U+2BDF	Similar to White Moon, but calculated from the "true" Black Moon rather than the mean Black Moon.
symbols related to Lilith	Solar apogee		--	--	Assumes an Earth-centered universe; the heliocentric equivalent would be terrestrial aphelion. Used to derive the (true) White Moon from the (true) Black Moon: ⯟ = ☊ + 7/4(⯞ − + 180°)
Zodiac sign elements	Zodiacal elements: Air (Gemini, Libra, Aquarius)		🜁	U+1F701	The four element symbols combine into a six-pointed star to form the quintessence.
Zodiac sign elements	Fire (Aries, Leo, Sagittarius)		🜂	U+1F702	The four element symbols combine into a six-pointed star to form the quintessence.
Zodiac sign elements	Earth (Taurus, Virgo, Capricorn)		🜃	U+1F703	The four element symbols combine into a six-pointed star to form the quintessence.
Zodiac sign elements	Water (Cancer, Scorpio, Pisces)		🜄	U+1F704	The four element symbols combine into a six-pointed star to form the quintessence.
Alchemical 'Three primes'	Zodiacal modalities: cardinal		🜍	U+1F70D	Western astrological symbolism has common early origin with alchemical shorthand glyphs, and planetary divination has long been held in association with alchemy's symbols; the three primes of Paracelsus have been associated with the zodiac sign modalities, and tendencies of their nature in an elementary way to be construed as being mutable (Quick-Silver or Mercury), fixed (Salt) or be cardinal (Sulfur).
Alchemical 'Three primes'	fixed		🜔	U+1F714	Western astrological symbolism has common early origin with alchemical shorthand glyphs, and planetary divination has long been held in association with alchemy's symbols; the three primes of Paracelsus have been associated with the zodiac sign modalities, and tendencies of their nature in an elementary way to be construed as being mutable (Quick-Silver or Mercury), fixed (Salt) or be cardinal (Sulfur).
Alchemical 'Three primes'	mutable		☿	U+263F	Western astrological symbolism has common early origin with alchemical shorthand glyphs, and planetary divination has long been held in association with alchemy's symbols; the three primes of Paracelsus have been associated with the zodiac sign modalities, and tendencies of their nature in an elementary way to be construed as being mutable (Quick-Silver or Mercury), fixed (Salt) or be cardinal (Sulfur).
Ophiuchus	Serpent-holder		⛎︎	U+26CE	Ophiuchus has been proposed as a thirteenth sign of the zodiac by astrologer Walter Berg in 1995, who gave it a symbol which gained some popularity in Japan.
Earth	Earth		🜨︎	U+1F728	Four quadrants of the Earth
Lot	Lot of fortune		🝴	U+1F774	Glyph for planet Earth rotated 45 degrees. In some fonts the tensor product, U+2297 ⊗, can be used as a substitute for the symbol.

== See also ==
- Alchemical symbols
- Aztec calendar
- Behenian fixed star
- Classical elements
- Earthly Branches
- Gender symbols
- Heavenly Stems
- Maya calendar
- Monas Hieroglyphica
- Planet symbol
- Nakshatra
- Navagraha
- Sexagenary cycle
- Sri Rama Chakra
- Vedic astrology
