= Persephone (disambiguation) =

Persephone is a Greek goddess.

Persephone may also refer to:

== Science ==
=== Planetary science ===
- 399 Persephone, an asteroid
- An early proposed name for the dwarf planet Eris
- An early proposed name for Pluto's moon Charon
- A proposed name for Planet Nine
- Persephone (spacecraft), a proposed orbiter mission to the Pluto system

=== Zoology ===
- Anthophorula persephone, an extinct species of bee
- Rhadine persephone, a species of beetle
- Betta persephone, a species of betta fish
- Chazara persephone, a species of butterfly
- Papilio persephone Fabricus, former name for the butterfly Acraea egina
- Papilio persephone, former name for the butterfly Erebia pluto
- Prodryas persephone, an extinct species of butterfly
- Aeshna persephone, a species of dragonfly
- Eumillipes persephone, a species of millipede
- Arctia persephone, former name for the Apantesis anna moth
- Catoptria persephone, a species of moth
- Eilema persephone, a species of moth
- Hypercompe persephone, a species of moth
- Stygioides persephone, a species of moth
- Opisthoteuthis persephone, a species of octopus
- Confuga persephone, a species of planthopper
- Petrogale persephone, a species of rock-wallaby
- Volutomitra persephone, a species of sea snail
- Amphisbaena persephone, a species of worm lizard

== Media ==
=== Artwork ===
- Persephone (painting), 1939, by Thomas Hart Benton
- Persephone (sculpture), circa 1840, by Armand Toussaint

=== Music ===
- Persephone (instrument), an electronic fingerboard synthesizer
- Perséphone (Stravinsky), a 1934 musical work
- "Persephone", a song by Dead Can Dance from Within the Realm of a Dying Sun
- "Persephone", a song by Cocteau Twins from Treasure
- "Persephone", a song by Wishbone Ash from There's the Rub
- "Persephone", a song by Opeth from Sorceress
- "Perséphone", a song by Year of No Light from Ausserwelt

=== Science fiction ===
- Persephone (planet), any of several fictional planets in various science fiction works

=== Television ===
- Persephone (tugboat), a salvage ship in the Canadian comedy drama The Beachcombers
- Persephone, a planet in the series Firefly

== Other uses ==
- Persephone (given name)
- Persephone Books, a British publisher
- The Persephone Painter (ca. 475 to 425 BCE), the pseudonym of an ancient Attic Greek vase painter

== See also ==
- Persephone in popular culture
- Proserpina (disambiguation), the Roman equivalent to "Persephone"
- Persefone, a metal band from Andorra
- Persophone, a speaker of the Persian language
