= H. laeta =

H. laeta may refer to:

- Hamataliwa laeta, a Mexican spider
- Haworthia laeta, a succulent plant
- Heteropsis laeta, a Malagasy butterfly
- Heterosternuta laeta, a predaceous diving beetle
- Himerarctia laeta, a Brazilian moth
- Histopona laeta, a funnel-web spider
- Holomelina laeta, a Northern American moth
- Hydnochaete laeta, a plant pathogen
- Hypercompe laeta, a Venezuelan moth
- Hypoestes laeta, a dicotyledonous plant
