= Walter Berg =

Walter Berg may refer to:

- Walter Berg (astrologer) (born 1947), British astrologer
- Walter Berg (footballer) (1916–1949), German footballer
