= Himerarctia griseipennis =

Scientific classification
- Domain: Eukaryota
- Kingdom: Animalia
- Phylum: Arthropoda
- Class: Insecta
- Order: Lepidoptera
- Superfamily: Noctuoidea
- Family: Erebidae
- Subfamily: Arctiinae
- Genus: Himerarctia
- Species: H. griseipennis

Binomial name
- Himerarctia griseipennis (Rothschild, 1909)

Synonyms
- Automolis griseipennis Rothschild, 1909

Species of moth

Himerarctia griseipennis is a moth of the family Erebidae. It was described by Walter Rothschild in 1909. It is found in Brazil.
