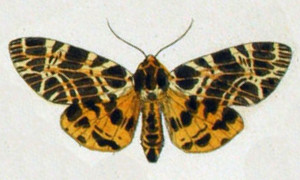

Scientific classification
- Kingdom: Animalia
- Phylum: Arthropoda
- Clade: Pancrustacea
- Class: Insecta
- Order: Lepidoptera
- Superfamily: Noctuoidea
- Family: Erebidae
- Subfamily: Arctiinae
- Genus: Oxyptera
- Species: O. ochreator

Binomial name
- Oxyptera ochreator (Felder & Rogenhofer, 1874)

Synonyms
- Ecpantheria ochreator Felder, 1874; Hypercompe ochreator (Felder, 1874)

= Oxyptera ochreator =

Species of moth

Oxyptera ochreator is a species of tiger moth that was first described by Felder and Rogenhofer in 1874. It is found in Guatemala.
