= Oxyptera guyanensis =

Scientific classification
- Kingdom: Animalia
- Phylum: Arthropoda
- Clade: Pancrustacea
- Class: Insecta
- Order: Lepidoptera
- Superfamily: Noctuoidea
- Family: Erebidae
- Subfamily: Arctiinae
- Genus: Oxyptera
- Species: O. guyanensis

Binomial name
- Oxyptera guyanensis Laguerre, 2009

Synonyms
- Hypercompe guyanensis Laguerre, 2009

Species of moth

Oxyptera guyanensis is a species of moth in the family Erebidae. It is found in French Guiana.
