= Oxyptera praeclara =

Scientific classification
- Kingdom: Animalia
- Phylum: Arthropoda
- Clade: Pancrustacea
- Class: Insecta
- Order: Lepidoptera
- Superfamily: Noctuoidea
- Family: Erebidae
- Subfamily: Arctiinae
- Genus: Oxyptera
- Species: O. praeclara

Binomial name
- Oxyptera praeclara (Oberthür, 1881)

Synonyms
- Ecpantheria praeclara Oberthür, 1881; Hypercompe praeclara Oberthür, 1881

Species of moth

Oxyptera praeclara is a species of moth in the family Erebidae that was first described by Charles Oberthür in 1881. It is found in Colombia.
