= Ophiuchus (astrology) =

Proposed thirteenth astrological sign

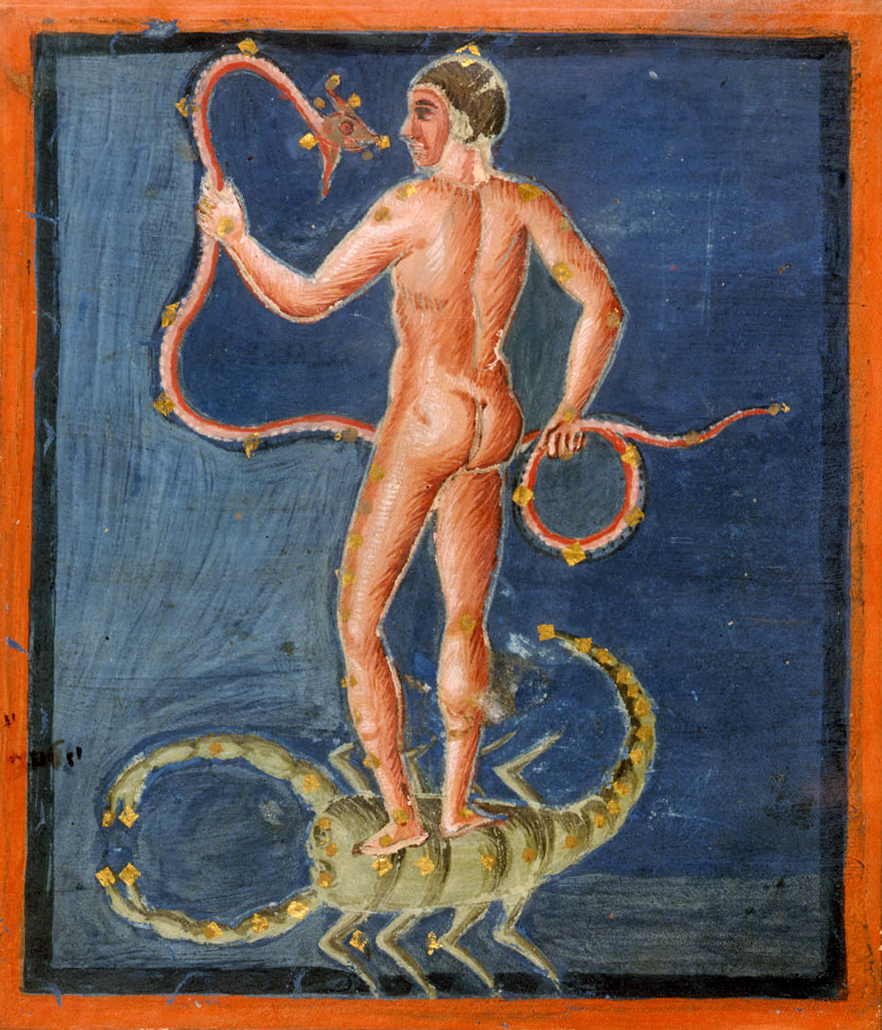
Artistic depiction of the constellation Ophiuchus, the serpent-bearer

Ophiuchus (/ˌɒfiˈjuːkəs/ o-fee-YOO-kəs; Ancient Greek: Ὀφιοῦχος, lit. 'Serpent-bearer'; astrological symbol ⛎︎) has been proposed as a 13th sign of the sidereal and tropical zodiac. The idea appears to have originated in 1970 with Steven Schmidt's suggestion of a 14-sign zodiac, also including Cetus as a sign. A 13-sign zodiac has been promulgated by Walter Berg and by Mark Yazaki in 1995, a suggestion that achieved some popularity in Japan. Both Schmidt and Berg suggested Pluto to be the ruler of Ophiuchus.

However, in sidereal and tropical astrology (including sun-sign astrology), a 12-sign zodiac is based on dividing the ecliptic into 12 equal parts rather than the International Astronomical Union's constellation boundaries. That is, astrological signs do not correspond to the constellations which are their namesakes, particularly not in the case of the tropical system where the divisions are fixed relative to the equinox, moving relative to the constellations. The astronomical constellation Ophiuchus, as defined by the 1930 IAU's constellation boundaries, is situated behind the Sun from November 29 to December 18.

== History ==
The constellation is described in the astrological poem of Marcus Manilius as the one that winds in loops: "But, bending its supple neck, the serpent looks back and returns: and the other's hands slide over the loosened coils. The struggle will last forever, since they wage it on level terms with equal powers". Later in his poem, he describes the astrological influence of Ophiuchus, when the constellation is in its rising phase, as one which offers affinity with snakes and protection from poisons, saying "he renders the forms of snakes innocuous to those born under him. They will receive snakes into the folds of their flowing robes, and will exchange kisses with these poisonous monsters and suffer no harm". A later 4th century astrologer, known as Anonymous of 379, associated "the bright star of Ophiuchus", Ras Alhague (α Ophiuchi), with doctors, healers or physicians (ἰατρῶν), which may have been because of the association between poisons and medicines.

Based on the 1930 IAU constellation boundaries, suggestions that there are "13 astrological signs" because "the Sun is in the sign of Ophiuchus" between November 30 and December 18 have been published since at least the 1970s.

In 1970, Steven Schmidt in his Astrology 14 advocated a 14-sign, equal-length zodiac, introducing Ophiuchus (December 6 to 31) and Cetus (May 12 to June 6) as new signs. Schmidt's book attracted the attention of the news magazine Time, where mainstream astrologers criticized his proposals (such as dropping the usage of classical elements in his system). This led Schmidt to publish The Astrology 14 Horoscope: How to Cast and Interpret It in 1974, with Pluto as the ruler of Ophiuchus (instead of Scorpio) and Jupiter as the ruler of Cetus. Within 20th-century sidereal astrology, the idea was taken up by Walter Berg in the form of his book, The 13 Signs of the Zodiac (1995). Berg also supported Pluto as the ruler of Ophiuchus.

In January 2011, a statement by Parke Kunkle, an astronomer at the Minnesota Planetarium Society, repeated the idea of "the 13th zodiac sign Ophiuchus" which made some headlines in the popular press.

== See also ==
- International Fixed Calendar
