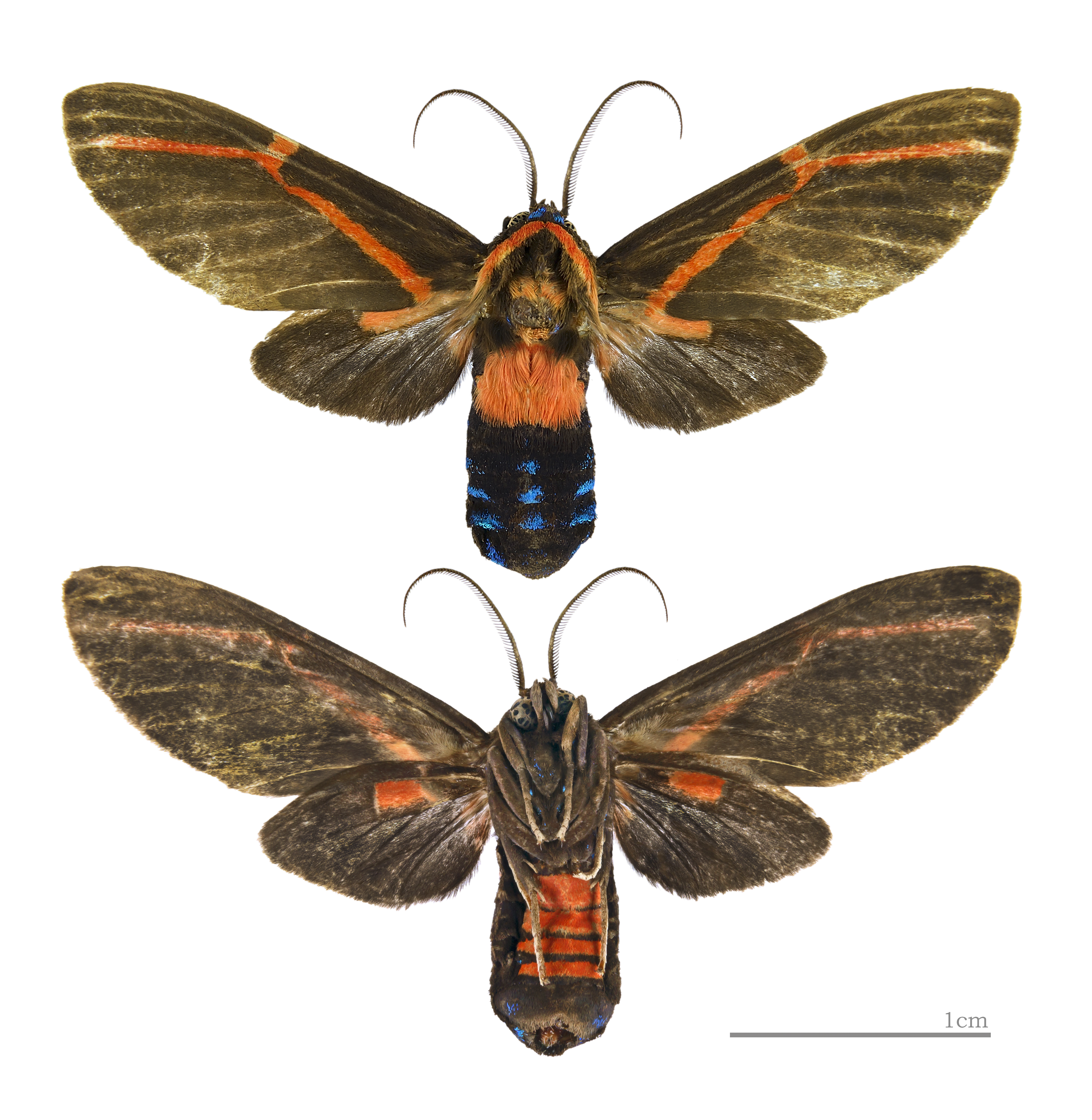

Scientific classification
- Kingdom: Animalia
- Phylum: Arthropoda
- Clade: Pancrustacea
- Class: Insecta
- Order: Lepidoptera
- Superfamily: Noctuoidea
- Family: Erebidae
- Subfamily: Arctiinae
- Genus: Himerarctia
- Species: H. docis

Binomial name
- Himerarctia docis (Hübner, [1831])

Synonyms
- Automolis docis Hübner, [1831]; Automolis basalis Walker, 1856; Automolis docis ab. tenebrata Seitz, 1921

= Himerarctia docis =

Species of moth

Himerarctia docis is a moth of the family Erebidae. It was described by Jacob Hübner in 1831. It is found in French Guiana, Guyana, Brazil, Colombia, Peru and Bolivia.
