= Himerarctia viridisignata =

Scientific classification
- Domain: Eukaryota
- Kingdom: Animalia
- Phylum: Arthropoda
- Class: Insecta
- Order: Lepidoptera
- Superfamily: Noctuoidea
- Family: Erebidae
- Subfamily: Arctiinae
- Genus: Himerarctia
- Species: H. viridisignata

Binomial name
- Himerarctia viridisignata Watson, 1975

Species of moth

Himerarctia viridisignata is a moth of the family Erebidae. It was described by Watson in 1975. It is found in Brazil.
