= Oxyptera =

Scientific classification
- Kingdom: Animalia
- Phylum: Arthropoda
- Clade: Pancrustacea
- Class: Insecta
- Order: Lepidoptera
- Superfamily: Noctuoidea
- Family: Erebidae
- Subfamily: Arctiinae
- Subtribe: Spilosomina
- Genus: Oxyptera; Laguerre, 2023

Type species
- Ecpantheria steinbachi Rothschild, 1910

Genus of moths

Oxyptera is a genus of tiger moths in the family Erebidae that was erected by French entomologist Michel Laguerre in 1883. Many of the species in the genus were split from the genus Hypercompe.

== Taxonomy ==
The following species are recognised in the genus Oxyptera:

- Oxyptera brasiliensis (Oberthür, 1881)
- Oxyptera cotyora (Druce, 1884)
- Oxyptera ecpantherioides (Rothschild, 1935)
- Oxyptera guyanensis (Laguerre, 2009)
- Oxyptera laeta (Walker, 1855)
- Oxyptera leucarctioides (Grote & Robinson, 1867)
- Oxyptera magdalenae (Oberthür, 1881)
- Oxyptera ochreator (Felder & Rogenhofer, 1874)
- Oxyptera persephone (Tessmann, 1928)
- Oxyptera praeclara (Oberthür, 1881)
- Oxyptera steinbachi (Rothschild, 1910)
- Oxyptera unilineata (Gaede, 1928)
