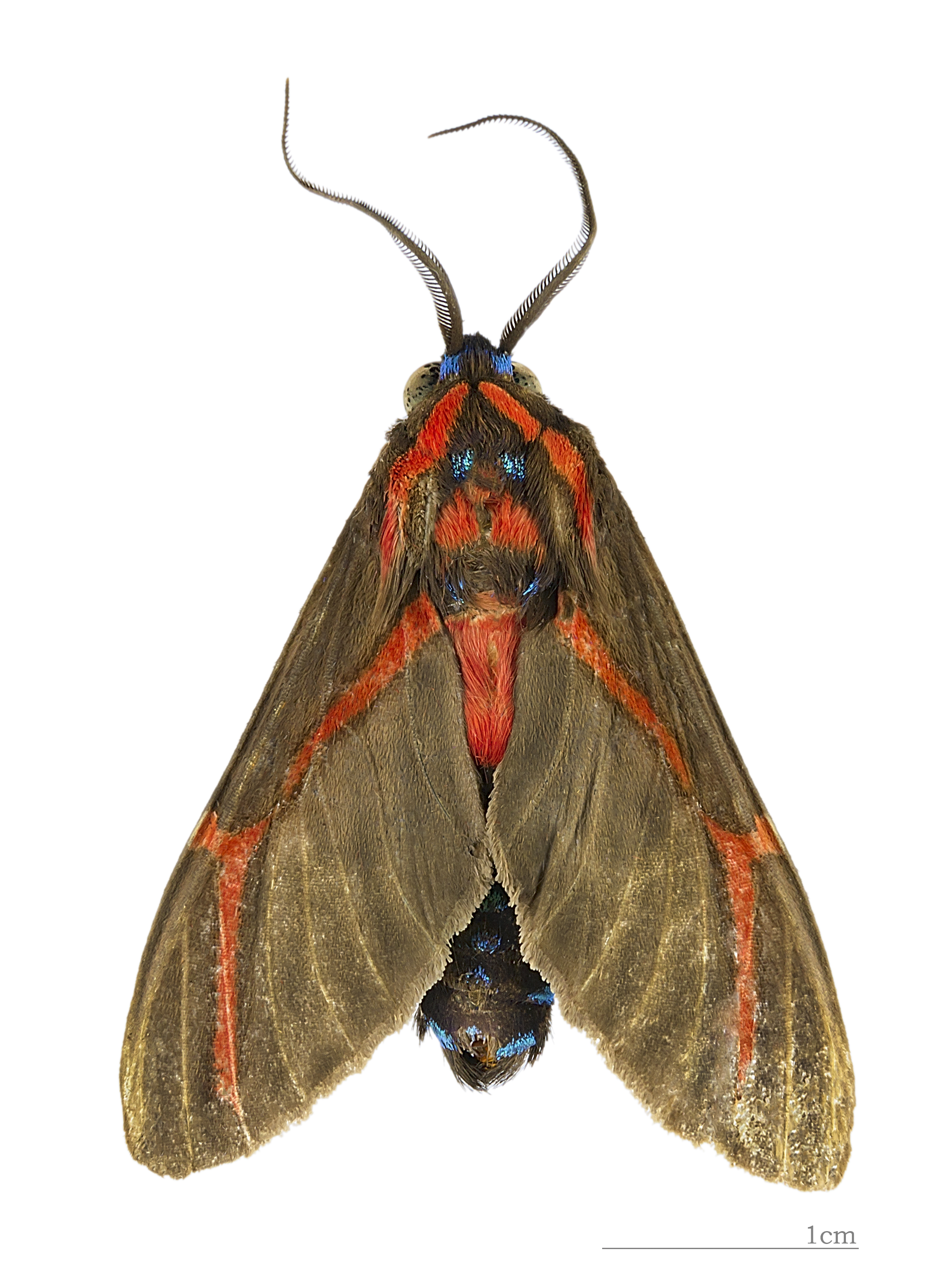
- Himerarctia docis - Muséum de Toulouse

Scientific classification
- Domain: Eukaryota
- Kingdom: Animalia
- Phylum: Arthropoda
- Class: Insecta
- Order: Lepidoptera
- Superfamily: Noctuoidea
- Family: Erebidae
- Subfamily: Arctiinae
- Subtribe: Phaegopterina
- Genus: Himerarctia; Watson, 1975

= Himerarctia =

Genus of moths

Himerarctia is a genus of moths in the family Erebidae. The genus was described by Watson in 1975.

== Taxonomy ==
- Himerarctia docis (Hübner, [1831])
- Himerarctia griseipennis (Rothschild, 1909)
- Himerarctia laeta Watson, 1975
- Himerarctia viridisignata Watson, 1975
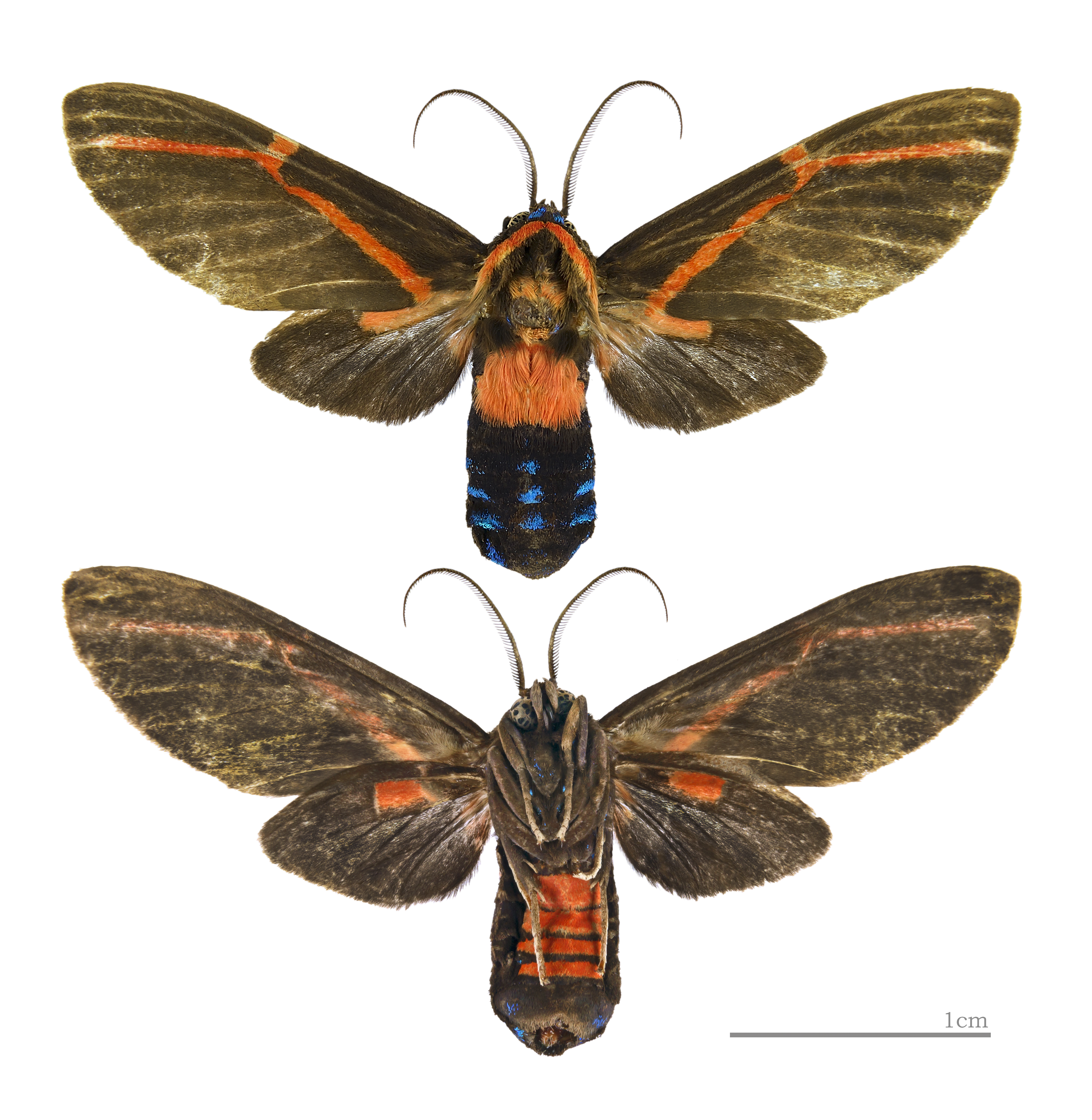
Himerarctia docis
