= Oxyptera cotyora =

Scientific classification
- Kingdom: Animalia
- Phylum: Arthropoda
- Clade: Pancrustacea
- Class: Insecta
- Order: Lepidoptera
- Superfamily: Noctuoidea
- Family: Erebidae
- Subfamily: Arctiinae
- Genus: Oxyptera
- Species: O. cotyora

Binomial name
- Oxyptera cotyora (H. Druce, 1884)

Synonyms
- Ecpantheria cotyora H. Druce, 1884; Hypercompe cotyora (H. Druce, 1884); Ecpantheria f. unilineata Gaede, 1928

Species of moth

Oxyptera cotyora is a species of moth in the family Erebidae that was first described by Herbert Druce in 1884. It is found in Costa Rica and Panama.
