= Oxyptera ecpantherioides =

Scientific classification
- Kingdom: Animalia
- Phylum: Arthropoda
- Clade: Pancrustacea
- Class: Insecta
- Order: Lepidoptera
- Superfamily: Noctuoidea
- Family: Erebidae
- Subfamily: Arctiinae
- Genus: Oxyptera
- Species: O. ecpantherioides

Binomial name
- Oxyptera ecpantherioides (Rothschild, 1935)

Synonyms
- Turuptiana ecpantherioides Rothschild, 1935; Hypercompe ecpantherioides (Rothschild, 1935)

Species of moth

Oxyptera ecpantherioides is a species of moth in the family Erebidae. It was first described by Walter Rothschild in 1935 and is found in Panama.
