= Walter Berg (astrologer) =

British astrologer

Walter Berg (born 1947) is a British astrologer, known for his system of a 13-sign sidereal astrology (13), "a sidereal system that uses the actual star constellations of the true zodiac". He has published several best selling books on horoscopy and divination in Japan and has appeared regularly on Fuji Television.

== Biography ==
Berg was born Barry Parkinson in Chorley, Lancashire, England on 28 October 1947. Between 1988 and 1994 he wrote extensively for electronic repair manuals and produced course material for science education.

In 1980, while studying and practising astrology Berg became acquainted with astrologer Jeff Mayo and collaborated with him on several projects while developing 13-sign astrology.

In 1989 he began writing "The Evening Sky", a monthly New Age and cultural astronomy feature syndicated to local newspapers, schools, colleges, universities, and released onto the Packet Switched Radio Network. A monthly guest on BBC Eastern Counties and Three Counties Radio, independent Horizon and Chiltern Radio was the 'expert spokesperson' on numerous national radio and television networks.

=== 13-sign astrology ===
Berg published The 13 Signs of the Zodiac in 1995, which sold well in the UK. The 13 Signs of the Zodiac was published in Japan in 1996 in a translation by radio host Mizui Hisami (水井久美), and the first edition sold out within days. Throughout 1996 Berg appeared each Monday on Fuji Television's Big Today programme networked nationally to an audience of nine million. During 1996–97 Berg wrote for major Japanese magazines and produced a weekly column in the broadsheet newspaper Sankei that he continues to write. Berg has constructed 13-sign profiles for many 'A’ list Japanese celebrities and politicians.

In 1995 Berg proposed a symbol for Ophiuchus which has come into comparatively widespread use in Japan. The symbol looks like a letter U with a superimposed tilde. In 2009, it was suggested for inclusion in the Unicode standard as part of an emoji extension. The symbol has been added to the Unicode Miscellaneous Symbols codepage (U+26CE ⛎) as of version 6.0 (October 2010).

In 2008, he published (under Barry Parkinson, his birth name) a book combining traditional 12-sign horoscopy with the concept of blood group–based personality types popularised in Japan in the 1970s by Masahiko Nomi, resulting in a system of 48 personality types.

As of 2008, he practises from Mayfair, London, UK and Shibuya-ku, Tokyo, Japan.

| Sign | | Traditional (tropical) dates | Dates based on the IAU constellations (as of 2011) |
|---|---|---|---|
| Aries | The Ram | 21 March to 20 April | 18 April to 13 May |
| Taurus | The Bull | 21 April to 20 May | 13 May to 21 June |
| Gemini | The Twins | 21 May to 21 June | 21 June to 20 July |
| Cancer | The Crab | 22 June to 22 July | 20 July to 10 August |
| Leo | The Lion | 23 July to 22 August | 10 August to 16 September |
| Virgo | The Virgin | 23 August to 22 September | 16 September to 30 October |
| Libra | The Scales | 23 September to 22 October | 30 October to 23 November |
| Scorpio | The Scorpion | 23 October to 22 November | 23 to 29 November |
| Ophiuchus | The Serpent Bearer | | 29 November to 18 December |
| Sagittarius | The Archer / Centaur | 23 November to 21 December | 18 December to 20 January |
| Capricorn | The Sea-goat | 22 December to 20 January | 20 January to 16 February |
| Aquarius | The Water Bearer | 21 January to 18 February | 16 February to 11 March |
| Pisces | The Fish | 19 February to 20 March | 11 March to 17 April |

== Selected publications ==
=== United Kingdom ===
- The 13 Signs of the Zodiac, HarperCollins (1995) ISBN 0-7225-3254-7
- Your Brilliant Guide to the 1999 Total Solar Eclipse, Sigma Press (1999) ISBN 1-85058-676-4
- Your Universe and You: Your Brilliant Guide to the Night Sky, Sigma Press (2000) ISBN 1-85058-731-0
- Under Starry Skies: Tracing Our Cosmic Heritage, uvshift (2001) ISBN 0-9540211-0-X

=== Japan ===
- 13星座の星占い (The 13 Signs of the Zodiac), Shodensha Co. Ltd (1996) ISBN 4-396-10374-3
- 13星座で本当の自分がわかる (13 Zodiac: Personality), Fusosha 扶桑社文庫 (1996) ISBN 4-594-02029-1
- 13星座・恋愛占い (13 Zodiac: Love), Fusosha (1996) ISBN 4-594-02092-5
- 天空の企て (Voice of the Heavens), Fusosha (1997) ISBN 4-594-02276-6
- 円卓の騎士占い (Knights of the Round Table: Fortune), Fusosha (2003) ISBN 4-594-04118-3
- キング・アーサーと円卓の騎士占い (King Arthur and the Knights of the Round Table: Fortune), Fusosha (2004), ISBN 978-4-594-04654-5.
- (as Barry Parkinson バリー・パーキンソン) 「血液型×星座占い」 48ランキングで本当の自分が分かる! Blood Type × Horoscopes: 48 True Rankings, Understand Yourself!, Fusosha (2008) ISBN 978-4-594-05806-7.
