= Oxyptera brasiliensis =

Scientific classification
- Kingdom: Animalia
- Phylum: Arthropoda
- Clade: Pancrustacea
- Class: Insecta
- Order: Lepidoptera
- Superfamily: Noctuoidea
- Family: Erebidae
- Subfamily: Arctiinae
- Genus: Oxyptera
- Species: O. brasiliensis

Binomial name
- Oxyptera brasiliensis (Oberthür, 1881)

Synonyms
- Ecpantheria brasiliensis Oberthür, 1881; Hypercompe brasiliensis (Oberthür, 1881)

Species of moth

Oxyptera brasiliensis is a species of moth in the family Erebidae that was first described by Charles Oberthür in 1881. It is found in Brazil and French Guiana.

The larvae have been recorded feeding on Gossypium herbaceum.
