= Oxyptera leucarctioides =

Scientific classification
- Kingdom: Animalia
- Phylum: Arthropoda
- Clade: Pancrustacea
- Class: Insecta
- Order: Lepidoptera
- Superfamily: Noctuoidea
- Family: Erebidae
- Subfamily: Arctiinae
- Genus: Oxyptera
- Species: O. leucarctioides

Binomial name
- Oxyptera leucarctioides (Grote & Robinson, 1867)

Synonyms
- Ecpantheria leucarctioides Grote & Robinson, 1867; Hypercompe leucarctioides (Grote & Robinson, 1867); Ecpantheria tenella H. Edwards, 1884; Ecpantheria trebula Druce, 1884

Species of moth

Oxyptera leucarctioides is a species of moth in the family Erebidae that was first described by Augustus Radcliffe Grote and Coleman Townsend Robinson in 1867. It is found in Mexico and Guatemala.
