= Oxyptera magdalenae =

Scientific classification
- Kingdom: Animalia
- Phylum: Arthropoda
- Clade: Pancrustacea
- Class: Insecta
- Order: Lepidoptera
- Superfamily: Noctuoidea
- Family: Erebidae
- Subfamily: Arctiinae
- Genus: Oxyptera
- Species: O. magdalenae

Binomial name
- Oxyptera magdalenae (Oberthür, 1881)

Synonyms
- Ecpantheria magdalenae Oberthür, 1881; Hypercompe magdalenae (Oberthür, 1881); Ecpantheria magdalenae steinbachi Rothschild, 1910

Species of moth

Oxyptera magdalenae is a species of moth in the family Erebidae first described by Charles Oberthür in 1881. It is found in Colombia and Bolivia.
