= Himerarctia laeta =

Scientific classification
- Domain: Eukaryota
- Kingdom: Animalia
- Phylum: Arthropoda
- Class: Insecta
- Order: Lepidoptera
- Superfamily: Noctuoidea
- Family: Erebidae
- Subfamily: Arctiinae
- Genus: Himerarctia
- Species: H. laeta

Binomial name
- Himerarctia laeta Watson, 1975

Synonyms
- Automolis laeta Seitz, 1921

Species of moth

Himerarctia laeta is a moth of the family Erebidae. It was described by Watson in 1975. It is found in Brazil.
