= Oxyptera persephone =

Scientific classification
- Kingdom: Animalia
- Phylum: Arthropoda
- Clade: Pancrustacea
- Class: Insecta
- Order: Lepidoptera
- Superfamily: Noctuoidea
- Family: Erebidae
- Subfamily: Arctiinae
- Genus: Oxyptera
- Species: O. persephone

Binomial name
- Oxyptera persephone (Tessmann, 1928)

Synonyms
- Ecpantheria persephone Tessmann, 1928; Hypercompe persephone (Tessmann, 1928)

Species of moth

Oxyptera persephone is a species of moth in the family Erebidae that was first described by Günter Tessmann in 1928. It is found in Peru.
