= Masahiko Nomi =

Japanese journalist (1925-1981)

Masahiko Nomi (能見 正比古 Nomi Masahiko, July 18, 1925 – October 30, 1981) was a Japanese journalist who advocated Takeji Furukawa's idea of an influence of blood type on personality. He was also known as a sumo essayist.

== History ==
Nomi was born in Kanazawa, Ishikawa in 1925. He graduated from the engineering faculty of University of Tokyo, and after the graduation he enrolled to the law faculty of the same university. During this time he started his career as a writer.

His first book on the subject, Ketsueki-gata de Wakaru Aisho (Understanding Affinity by Blood Type) became a best seller in 1971. He wrote more than ten popular books. After his death in 1981, his son, Toshitaka Nomi (October 19, 1948 – September 27, 2006) inherited the study. He established the Human Science ABO Center in 2004.

== Blood Type Humanics ==
=== History ===
Blood-type research carried out during the 1920s and '30s in Germany, ostensibly focused on how to recognise blood of non-Aryan origins during the newly emerging medical procedure of blood transfusions, resurfaced in "Age of Aquarius"-era Japan. Removing the ethno-racial aspect, Nomi focused instead on the idea that blood types are linked to specific character types and behaviour patterns, then went on to write a book around what he termed Blood Type Humanics (血液型人間学). The book was hugely popular in Japan with the core idea of "blood type = personality type" becoming firmly embedded in Japanese popular culture and the cultures of other East Asian countries. While seeming quaint and harmless, cases of Japanese workers finding themselves on the receiving end of workplace issues arising from being of the "wrong" blood type is common enough for the phrase "bura hara" ("ブラハラ"), an abbreviation of "blood harassment", to have been coined.

=== Overview ===
A humorous simile of foods was introduced to help people get an image easily. He compared the human being as vegetables. In this way, there are a lot of kinds of vegetables, therefore there are various kinds of personalities for the same blood type. Type O people are fresh vegetables. Personalities of type O appears most, because fresh vegetables are not processed therefore variety is the richest among four blood types. Type A people are pickles. Properties of original vegetables remain even if fresh vegetables are processed to pickles. However, common properties of pickles do not change even if properties of fresh vegetables are controlled to a certain degree by processing.

Type B people are boiled (and seasoned) vegetables. As well as type A, common properties of boiled vegetables comes out. In addition, variety of personality decreases like type A to some extent compared to fresh vegetables. Type AB people are "boiled pickles"—called "fukujinzuke (福神漬)" in Japan. Of course, variety of personality is the poorest among four blood types.

Therefore, he often said that blood type can explain only "a quarter" of human personality. Personality comes from both nature (blood type) and nurture. As each vegetable has its own nature, half-and-half each makes a quarter.

== Books ==
- Understanding Affinity by Blood Type 血液型でわかる相性 伸ばす相手、こわす相手 9/1971
- Blood Type Humanics 血液型人間学 あなたを幸せにする性格分析 サンケイ新聞社出版局 8/1973
- Blood Type Affinity Study 血液型愛情学 愛と性のドラマ・20,000人の証言 サンケイ新聞社出版局 5/1974 - 20,000 samples analyzed in total
- Blood Type Sports Study 血液型スポーツ学 陸上競技編 講談社 10/1976 - 1,000 track-and-field athletes analyzed
- Blood Type Utilization Study 血液型活用学 自分を生かし、人間関係をよくする本 サンケイ新聞社出版局 5/1976
- Blood Type Essence 血液型エッセンス 性格と人間関係の実用百科 サンケイ出版 6/1977 - list over 1,000 people (politicians, CEOs, artists etc.)
- Blood Type Politics Study 血液型政治学 政治を動かす衝撃の事実! サンケイ出版 6/1978 - 2,000 politicians analyzed (all representatives of the national Diet, all governors and all mayors)
- Blood Type Essence 血液型エッセンス ABO血液型と気質の手引書 10/2022
- Blood Type View of Life 血液型人生論 自分らしく生きるための指南書 12/2022
