= Blood type personality theory =

Pseudoscience linking character and blood type

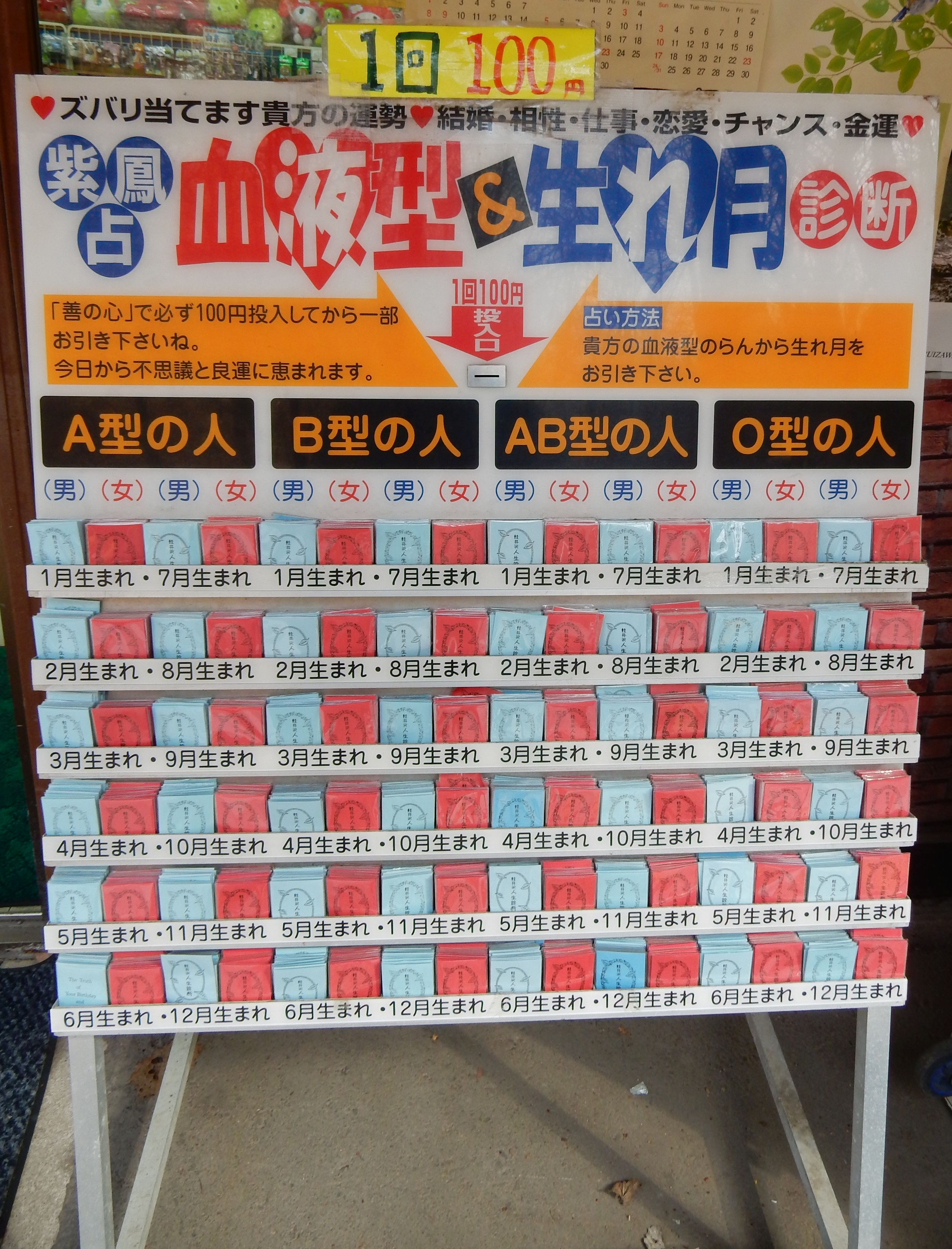
Blood type horoscope cards in Japan

The blood type personality theory is a pseudoscientific belief prevalent in East Asia that a person's blood type is predictive of a person's personality, temperament, and compatibility with others. The theory is generally considered a superstition by the scientific community.

One of the reasons Japan developed the blood type personality indicator theory was in reaction to a claim from German scientist Emil von Dungern that blood type B people were inferior. The popular belief originates with publications by Masahiko Nomi in the 1970s.

Although some medical hypotheses have been proposed in support of blood type personality theory, the scientific community generally dismisses blood type personality theories as superstition or pseudoscience because of lack of evidence or testable criteria. Despite the fact that research into the causal link between blood type and personality is limited, the majority of modern studies do not demonstrate any statistically significant association between the two. Some studies suggest that there is a statistically significant relationship between blood type and personality, although it is unclear if this is simply due to a self-fulfilling prophecy.

== Overview ==
According to popular belief, people with type A blood are friendly and kind but also obsessive and anxious, people with type B are spontaneous and creative but can be selfish, and people with type O are confident but stubborn and aggressive. In a logical extension of this system, those with type AB are a mix of stereotypical A and B traits, while also being seen as mysterious or aloof due to their relatively low population in Japan. The minority types B and AB are more likely to be negatively stereotyped than A or O.

== History ==
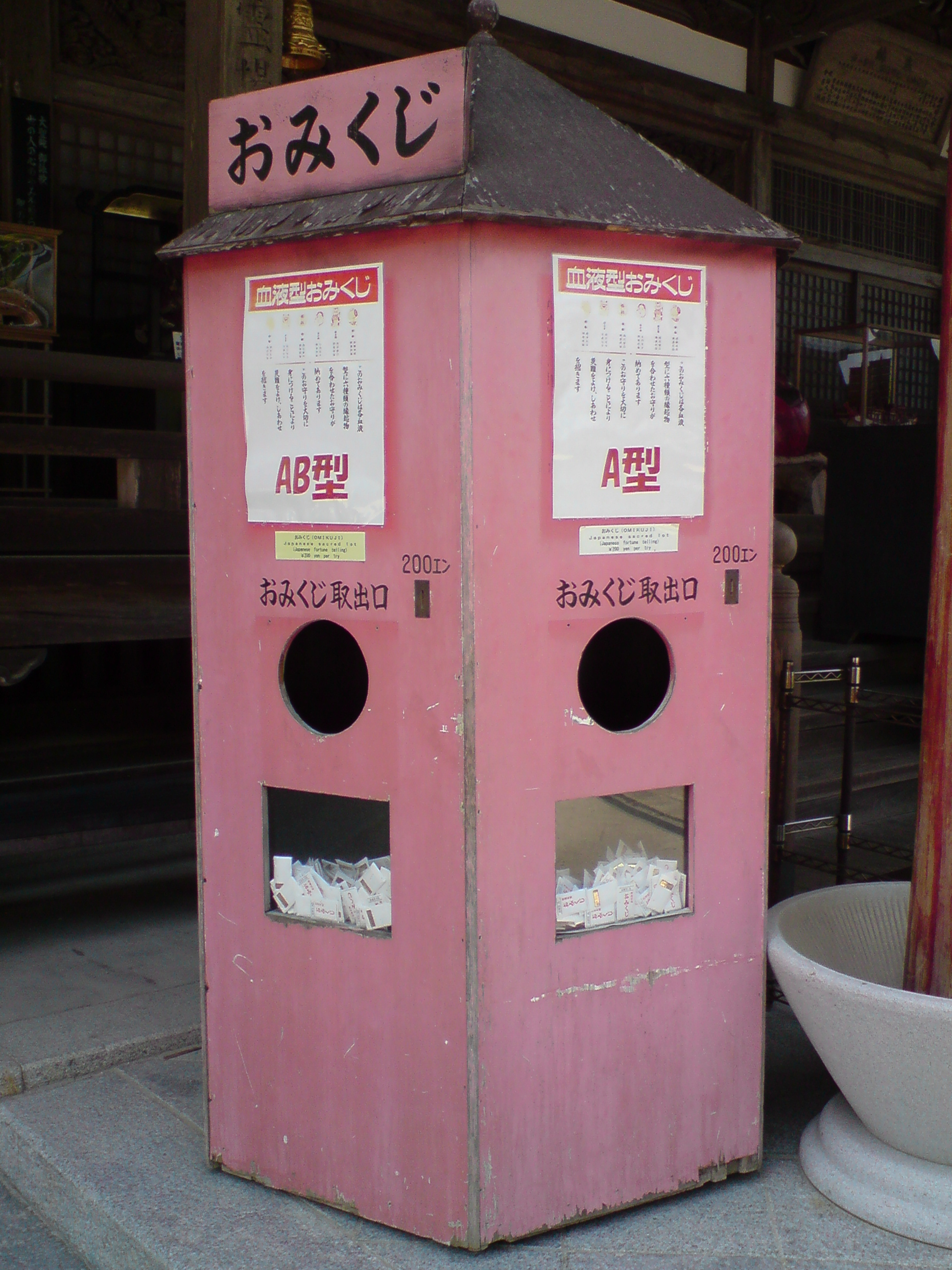
Machine offering blood-type based fortunes

The idea that personality traits were inherited through the blood dates as far back as Aristotle. Hippocrates also sought to link personality biologically, linking traits with the four bodily humors –sanguine, phlegmatic, choleric, and melancholic.

In 1926, Hayashi Hirano and Tomita Yajima published the article "Blood Type Biological Related" in the Army Medical Journal.

=== Takeji Furukawa ===
In 1927, Takeji Furukawa, a professor at Tokyo Women's Teacher's School, published his paper "The Study of Temperament Through Blood Type" in the scholarly journal Psychological Research. The idea quickly took off with the Japanese public despite Furukawa's lack of credentials, and the militarist government of the time commissioned a study aimed at breeding ideal soldiers. The study used ten to twenty people for the investigation, thereby failing to meet the statistical requirements for generalizing the results to the wider population. Several scholars said that they found statistically significant differences in analyzing Japanese work conducted at that time.

In another study, Furukawa compared the distribution of blood types among two ethnic groups: the Formosans in Taiwan and the Ainu of Hokkaidō. His motivation for the study appears to have come from a political incident: After the Japanese occupation of Taiwan following Japan's invasion of China in 1895, the inhabitants tenaciously resisted their occupiers. Insurgencies in 1930 and 1931 resulted in the deaths of hundreds of Japanese settlers.

The purpose of Furukawa's studies was to "penetrate the essence of the racial traits of the Taiwanese, who recently revolted and behaved so cruelly." Based on a finding that 41.2% of Taiwanese samples had type O blood, Furukawa assumed that the Taiwanese rebelliousness was genetic. His reasoning was supported by the fact that among the Ainu, whose temperament was characterized as submissive, only 23.8% is type O. In conclusion, Furukawa suggested that the Japanese should increase intermarriage with the Taiwanese to reduce the number of Taiwanese with type O blood.

=== Masahiko Nomi ===
Interest in the theory was revived in the 1970s with a book by Masahiko Nomi, a journalist with no medical background (he graduated from the engineering department of the University of Tokyo). Few Japanese psychologists criticized him at that time, so he continued to demonstrate statistically significant data in various fields and published several books with these results. Later after his death in 1981, Masahiko Nomi's work was said to be largely uncontrolled and anecdotal, and the methodology of his conclusions was unclear. Because of this, he was heavily criticized by the Japanese psychological community, although his books remain popular. His son, Toshitaka Nomi, continued to promote the theory with a series of books and by running the Institute of Blood Type Humanics. He later established the Human Science ABO Center for further research and publication in 2004.

== Background and criticism ==
=== Criticism ===
Kengo Nawata, a social psychologist, studied blood type correlations in a survey of 68 personality traits given to over 10,000 people from Japan and the US. His statistical analysis found that less than 0.3% of the total variance in personality was explained by blood type.

=== Controversial statistically significant data ===
However, some academic researchers have shown several statistically significant data in Japan and Korea. Akira Sakamoto and Kenji Yamazaki, Japanese social psychologists, analyzed 32,347 samples of annual opinion polls from 1978 through 1988. These results indicated that Japanese blood-typical stereotypes influenced their self-reported personalities – like a self-fulfilling prophecy.

Cosy Muto and Masahiro Nagashima et al. (Nagasaki University) conducted a supplementary survey of Yamazaki and Sakamoto in 2011. They demonstrated that significant and the same difference in personalities between blood-types by using the same database as Samamoto and Yamazaki used. In the 1990s, the difference due to blood types was stabilized and variances became smaller. Then in the 2000s, the difference was statistically significant, too. However, the effect magnitude was extremely small, despite 'significance' in the statistical sense.

Another Japanese social psychologist, Shigeyuki Yamaoka (Shotoku University), announced results of his questionnaires, which were conducted in 1999 (1,300 subjects) and 2006 (1,362 subjects), In both cases, the subjects were university students, and only subjects with enough knowledge of and belief in the "blood-type diagnosis" showed meaningful differences. He concluded that these differences must be the influence of mass media, especially TV programs. Yamaoka later examined 6,660 samples from 1999 through 2009 in total and found the same result.

On the other hand, some believe that the statistically meaningful differences according to the blood types are not explained only by beliefs, nor that they are a self-fulfilling prophecy. In Japan, the penetration rate of blood-typical personality traits was investigated. Yoriko Watanabe, a psychologist at Hokkaido University, chose "well-known" traits and found most traits were known to no more than half of Japanese people (subjects were university students). A Japanese writer, Masayuki Kanazawa, analyzed these blood-typical traits in combination with data from Yamaoka (1999) that used the same items from Watanabe's penetration survey. If blood-typical differences are caused by penetration (or their self-recognition), the rate of differences of a trait is proportional to the rate of its penetration. However, Kanazawa was not able to discover any association with blood-type differences and penetration rates. This result raises doubt about the role of beliefs and self-fulfilling prophecy.

Most reports that demonstrated statistical correlation attribute differences to a self-fulfilling prophecy. However, no study directly proved the existence of "self-fulfillment". Therefore, the opinions of researchers are varied at present:

1. Whether there is a statistical correlation or not;
2. Whether any statistical correlations are superficial, being caused by subjects' self-fulfilling prophecy, or if they are truly caused by the blood type.

=== Blood-type personality and the five-factor model ===
The five-factor model tests were carried out in several countries, including Japan, Korea, and Taiwan, after the year 2000. These tests were intended to digitize self-ratings of the "big five" personality traits. It was expected that differences in self-reported personalities (a self-fulfilling prophecy) would be detected from the subject who believed in blood-typical stereotypes. As a result, researchers found no meaningful statistical difference.

So Ho Cho, a Korean psychologist (Yonsei University), and the others carried out a questionnaire about blood-typical items to subjects and discovered statistical differences as expected. However, the difference was not found when the five-factor model for big five personality traits was administered to the same subjects. Another Korean researcher Sohn (Yonsei University) re-analyzed Cho's data. He found that several independent items of the big five personality test detected differences according to each blood-typical stereotype. However, these differences became extinct in the process of plural items being gathered to five factors (big five). If these results are correct, the five-factor model test cannot detect differences between the blood types – if such a causal link did indeed exist.

In 2014, a Korean matchmaking company 듀오 Duo conducted a research survey examined 3,000 couples and found that blood type had no significant impact on the possibility of a couple getting married.

In 2017, a meta-analysis of studies, using the Big Five personality test, involving 260,861 subjects found that six genes affected human personality. However, the coefficient of determination was as low as 0.04%. This is usually considered to be an error.

=== Studies of blood distribution in various fields ===
In order to avoid the influence of "contamination by knowledge", a Japanese psychologist group published a series of studies, but no significant differences were found except for Japanese prime ministers. Later, it was reported that significant differences were found not only for prime ministers, but also for foreign ministers, education ministers, professional baseball hitters, and soccer players in Japan.

=== Brain waves and light topography ===
Kim and Yi (Seoul University of Venture & Information) measured the brain waves of 4,636 adults. They reported that type O people were most stress-resistant.

== Popularity ==
In Japan, blood types are often used in women's magazines to determine relationship compatibility with potential or current partners. Blood type horoscopes are featured in morning television shows and daily newspapers. The blood types of celebrities are often listed in their infoboxes on Japanese Wikipedia. The four books of a series that describe people's character by blood type each ranked third, fourth, fifth, and ninth on a list of best-selling books in Japan in 2008.

One survey showed that at least two-thirds of respondents from Chinese-speaking East Asian countries and regions believe in an association between blood types and personality.

In a Japanese survey, more than half of Japanese respondents stated they were fond of talking about personalities based on blood types. The research also stated that people in Japan like blood-typical personality diagnoses, believe there is a relationship between blood type and personality, and feel its traits apply to themselves to a certain degree. Two other surveys showed similar results.

Although there is no proven correlation between blood type and personality, many matchmaking services use it. In this way, it is similar to the use of astrological signs, which are also popular in Japan. Asking one's blood type is common in Japan, and people are often surprised when a non-Japanese person does not know their blood type.

It is common among anime and manga authors to mention their characters' blood types and to give their characters blood types to match their personalities. Some video game characters also have known blood types. Some video game series also have blood type as a customisable option in their creation modes.

The Reconstruction Minister Ryu Matsumoto had to resign after abrasive comments towards the governors of Iwate and Miyagi. Afterwards, he partially blamed his behavior on his blood type, saying "My blood is type B, which means I can be irritable and impetuous, and my intentions don't always come across."

Blood types are important in South Korea as well. The Korean webcomic A Simple Thinking About Blood Type depicts stereotypes of each blood type and has been adapted as a short anime series in Japan as Ketsuekigata-kun! in 2013 and 2015.

== Discrimination ==
Blood type harassment, called bura-hara (wasei-eigo: a portmanteau of blood and harassment), has been blamed for bullying of children in playgrounds, loss of job opportunities, and the end of relationships.

Discrimination based on blood type has been reported in Japan and Korea. Examples include questions about blood types during job interviews despite government warnings against this, children being split up at school according to their blood type, a national softball team customizing training to fit each player's blood type, and companies giving work assignments according to employees' blood type.

However, these examples are contested and deemed apocryphal. Two counter-arguments are usually cited. Firstly, there have been no trials related to blood-type discrimination thus far. Secondly, most Japanese people do not think blood types determine their personalities, but rather affect them to some degree.

== See also ==
- Barnum effect
- Blood type diet
- Astrological signs—a similar framework popular in Western culture, using the positions of stars on a person's birthday to predict their personality.
