= Persephone (instrument) =

Analog fingerboard synthesizer

The Persephone is an analog fingerboard synthesizer from the year 2004 in the tradition of the first ribbon controlled instruments from the 1920s. Beyond its vintage look, the Persephone allies sensors technology and digital controls to a pure analogue generation of sound.

With its analogue oscillator, the Persephone can generate notes with a range of 10 octaves, which goes from a deep and resonant cello tone to a nearly human voice. And on the highest pitches, it can reach very high frequencies. Its ribbon virtual control surface allows all kind of glissando a Theremin or an Ondes Martenot would allow. The Persephone's ribbon can be scaled from 1, 2, 5 to 10 octaves. The ribbon responds to changes in voltage or resistance caused by changing the finger position along its surface. The Persephone ribbon controller is also able to record pressure or velocity.

The ribbon is a linear potentiometer that generates different control voltages depending on where it is touched. Thus, the modern ribbon on the Persephone replaces the nickel-chrome resistance wire used as a variable resistor to control the pitch of the trautonium^{1}. These changes in voltage are applied to the voltage-controlled oscillator and the filter. The voltage fluctuations are also translated into binary data and used to control digital modulation. With MIDI in/out and CV, it can also be used as a MIDI controller.
