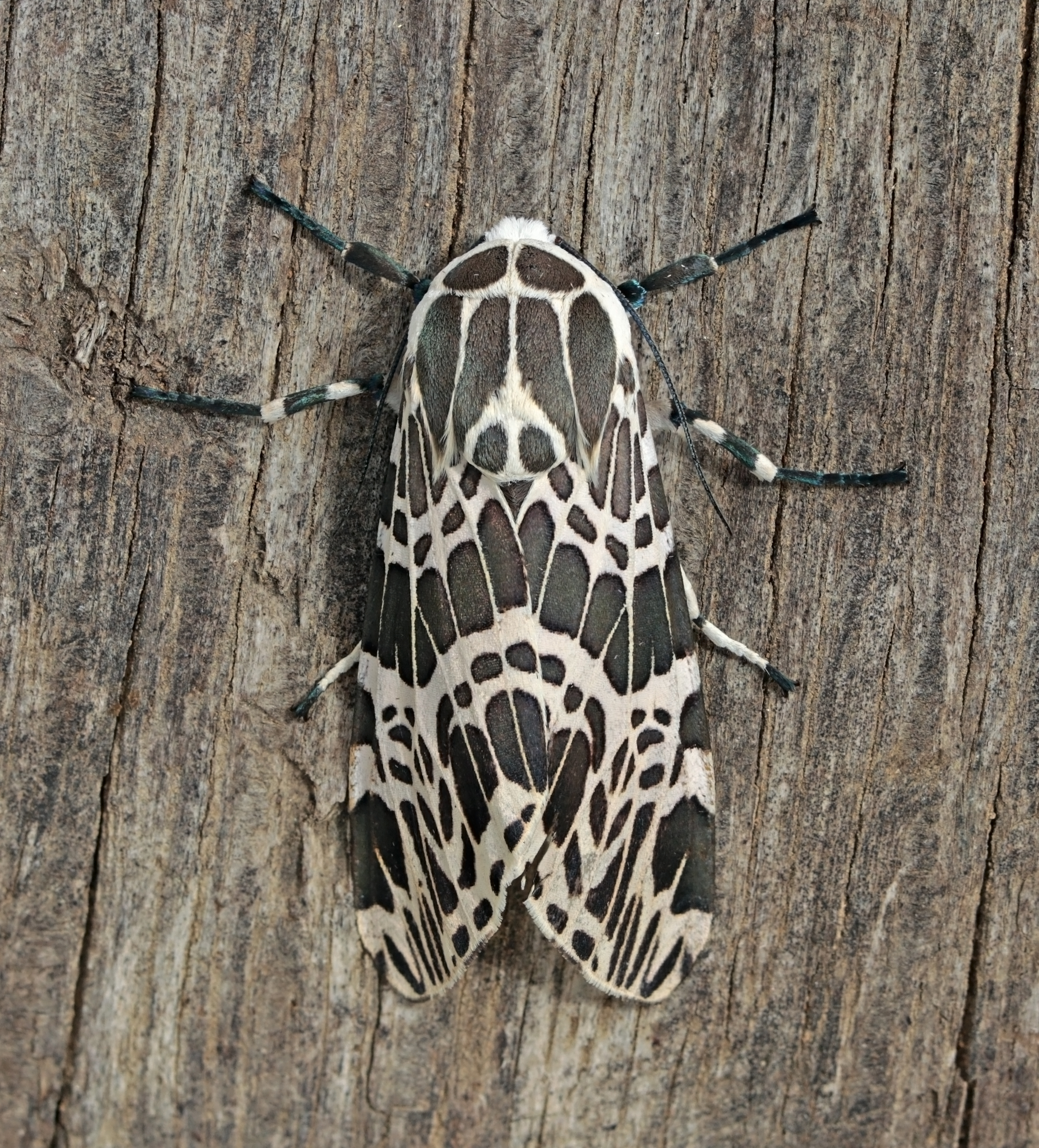
- Mount Totumas cloud forest, Panama

Scientific classification
- Kingdom: Animalia
- Phylum: Arthropoda
- Clade: Pancrustacea
- Class: Insecta
- Order: Lepidoptera
- Superfamily: Noctuoidea
- Family: Erebidae
- Subfamily: Arctiinae
- Genus: Oxyptera
- Species: O. laeta

Binomial name
- Oxyptera laeta (Walker, 1855)

Synonyms
- Ecpantheria laeta Walker, 1855; Hypercompe laeta (Walker, 1855)

= Oxyptera laeta =

Species of moth

Oxyptera laeta is a species of moth in the family Erebidae that was first described by Francis Walker in 1855. It is found in Panama and Venezuela.
