= Mold (disambiguation) =

Mold (or mould) is a structure formed by fungi.

Mold or mould may also refer to:

== Artifacts ==
- Molding (process), in which a hollowed-out block is filled with pliable material
- Mold (cooking implement), a container used to shape food

== Biology ==
- Leaf mold, a type of compost, in horticulture
- Slime mold, a kind of protist
- Water mold or oomycete, a kind of protist

== Entertainment ==
- Mold (album), Praxis' 1998 experimental music release
- Mold (film), a 2012 drama film
- Master Mold, a fictional Marvel Comics villain

== People ==
- Mold (surname)
- Mould (surname)

== Places ==
- Mold, Flintshire, a county town in Wales, UK
- Mold, an unincorporated community of Douglas County, Washington, US
- 18240 Mould, a main-belt asteroid

== Sports teams ==
- Mold F.C., a defunct Welsh association football club
- Mold RFC, a rugby union team from Mold, Wales
- Mold Golf Club, an 18-hole course in Pantymwyn, Wales

== See also ==
- Molding (disambiguation)
- Molde (disambiguation)
- Mulling (disambiguation)
- Mull (disambiguation)
- Indoor mold, enclosed mold as a health hazard
- Mildew, a similar non-mold fungus
- Mulled wine, a hot spiced alcoholic beverage
