= Delebat =

Mesopotamian name of the planet Venus

Delebat (also read Dilbat) was the most commonly used name of the planet Venus in Mesopotamian astronomy. The etymology of this term is unknown. Information about the Mesopotamian perception of Venus is available from sources such as astronomical texts, for example MUL.APIN, or astrological omen compendiums, such as Enūma Anu Enlil (in particular its sixty-third tablet, the Venus tablet of Ammisaduqa). One of the Mandaic names of Venus, Libat, is a loanword derived from Delebat.

== Meaning ==
Delebat is the most common name of the planet Venus attested in cuneiform texts from ancient Mesopotamia. It was written as ^{mul}dele-bat or ^{d}dele-bat. The reading Delebat depends on the Greek transcription Delephat, though Dilbat has been proposed as well. The etymology of this term is unknown. Hermann Hunger notes that the standard Akkadian reading of the signs used to write it would be nabû or nabītu, "shining brightly", but stresses that it remains uncertain if this reading was ever used as a name of Venus.

The name Delebat coexisted with other designations of Venus, including the name of the corresponding goddess, Ishtar, (Note: In this context this theonym was always written phonetically, and not with logograms such as ^{d}15, though this might only reflect chance preservation.) the Sumerian name Ninsianna, (Note: Ninsianna is attested as a designation of the planet Venus for the first time in the Ur III period, and occurs particularly commonly in Old Babylonian texts, though examples as late as from the Neo-Babylonian period are known.) and Nēbiru (which could also refer to Mercury or Jupiter, though in all three cases only when the planet was visible near the horizon).

In contrast with numerous other Mesopotamian astronomical terms, which could refer to more than one astral body, Delebat only ever designated Venus. However, it is not always possible to establish when the planet is meant, and when the deity associated with it. The theonym Ishtar and the astronomical term Delebat alternate in omen protases pertaining to the planet Venus. In the Cuthean Legend of Naram-Sin, known from Neo-Assyrian and Neo-Babylonian copies, Delebat is treated as an epithet of the corresponding goddess used to reflect her appearance to the eponymous protagonist, Naram-Sin of Akkad, under the guise of an astral body.

== Venus in Mesopotamian astronomy and astrology ==
=== Overview ===
Venus was one of the seven astral bodies referred to UDU.IDIM in Sumerian and as bibbu in Akkadian, with the other six being sun, moon, Mercury, Mars, Jupiter and Saturn, which indicates that these terms had an identical semantic range as the classical definition of the term planet. The literal translation of the Sumerian term is unclear, while the Akkadian one means "wild sheep", and might allude to irregular movement, though this remains uncertain. Based on archaic texts from the Uruk period it is presumed that the Mesopotamians were already aware that Venus was both the morning star and the evening star in the early third millennium BCE.

Venus was additionally the only astral body believed to make other planets and constellations "keep gaining radiance" (ittananbiṭu), which might reflect observations of scintillation or variable stars.

=== MUL.APIN ===
Venus is one of the seventy-one astral bodies described in the astronomical compendium MUL.APIN, first attested in seventh century BCE, though some information preserved in it dates back to earlier periods, with short lists of stars known from sources such as the Old Babylonian Urra=hubullu considered to be its possible forerunners. In this context Venus is classified as the last of the twenty-three "stars of Anu", a term referring to the traditional Mesopotamian division of the night sky into three "paths" named in honor of the gods Anu (center), Enlil (north) and Ea (south). It is grouped with Mercury, Mars and Jupiter.

=== Enūma Anu Enlil ===
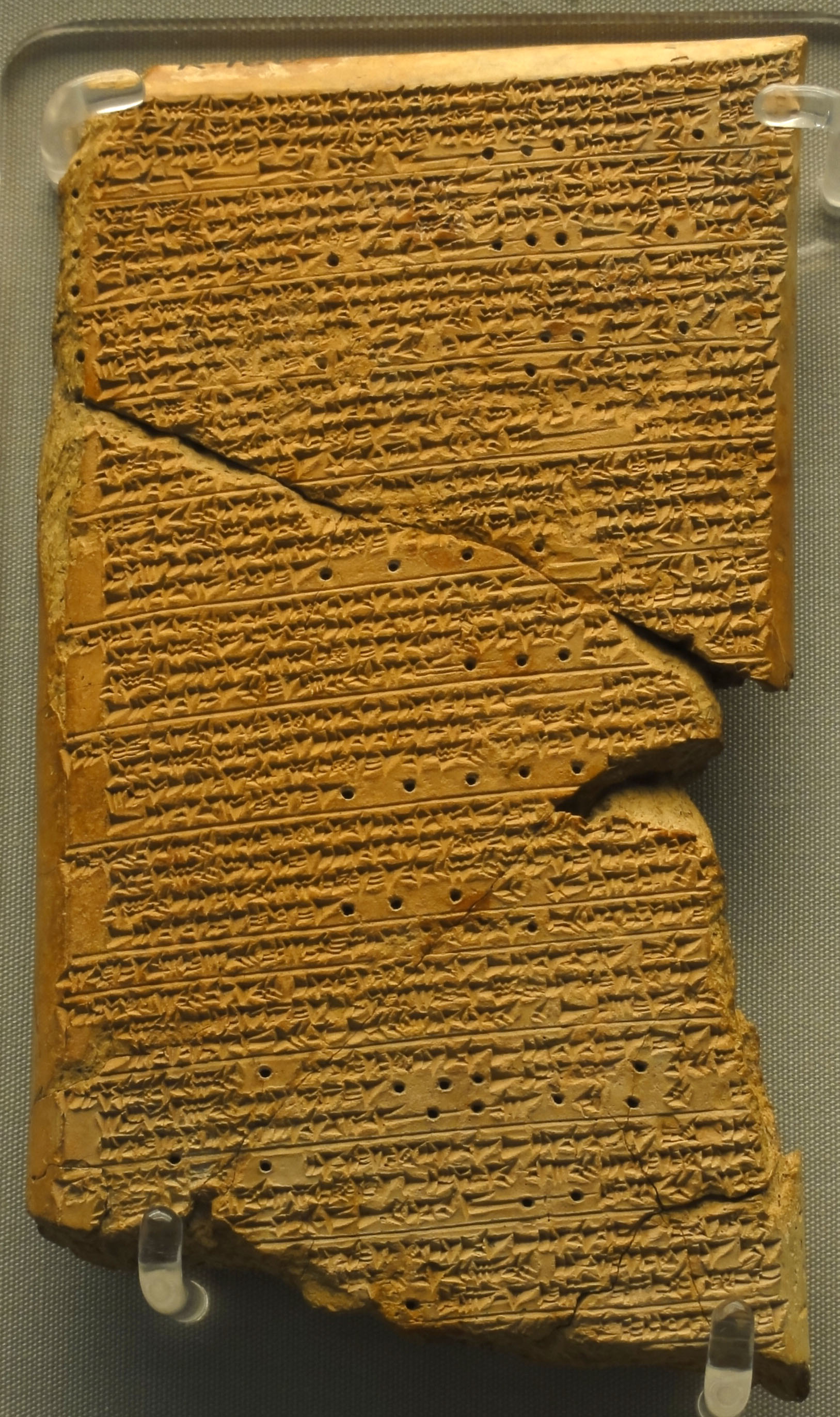
The Venus tablet of Ammisaduqa.

Venus is also among the planets described in the Enūma Anu Enlil, the earliest known compilation of planetary omens, dated to the Old Babylonian period. However, the placement of some of the discovered series of Venus omens within it remains uncertain. In at least some versions of the compendium, many Venus omens were compiled on the sixty-third tablet, sometimes referred to as the Venus tablet of Ammisaduqa in Assyriological literature. Multiple of them deal with situations in which Venus was visible alongside the moon, the sun, Jupiter (in this context usually referred to with the name Šulpae), and various constellations, such as the True Shepherd of Anu (Sipazianna), Scorpion, Enmesharra and the Bull of Heaven. Venus is variously described as being red, green, black or white in some of the omens, with the former two colors assumed to refer to the phenomenon of refraction observed when it is near the horizon, and the latter two likely only being a designation of brightness or lack of it.

=== Royal inscriptions and treaties ===
Growing royal interest in astrology and celestial divination might be reflected in explicit references to planets, including Venus, starting to appear in royal inscriptions during the reign of Sargon II, and the subsequent growth of this phenomenon during the reign of his grandson Esarhaddon. Venus and other planets are also attested among witnesses in Esarhaddon's treaty with his vassals meant to secure the ascension of his son Ashurbanipal to the throne.

== Legacy ==
=== Mandaic sources ===
One of the Mandaic names of the planet Venus, Libat, is derived from Delebat, with the first syllable of the Akkadian original possibly originally omitted due to being misunderstood as the Mandaic relative pronoun ḏ (ࡖ). (Note: Other attested Mandaic names of Venus include Amamit, Argiuat, Datia, Kukbat (a dimunitive of the word "star"), Spindar, ʿstira (a derivative of the Akkadian theonym Ishtar), Ruha ("spirit") and Ruha ḏ-qudša ("Holy Spirit", though the name has derogatory connotations in this context).) It is presumed that Mandaeans adopted numerous Akkadian astronomical terms, including the names of the seven classical planets, after their initial migration to Mesopotamia from the Jordan Valley. However, the planets are generally perceived negatively in Mandaean tradition. For example, in the Right Ginza Libat is described with the term daiuia, a loanword derived from the Middle Persian dēw, "demon". The planet is identified in this context with Amamit, a demonic figure derived from the Mesopotamian goddess Mamitu. An exception from the negative Mandaean perception of Venus are late antique magical formulas, in which Libat is sometimes invoked in a positive context, to secure success in love or procreation.

=== Other attestations ===
==== Hesychius of Alexandria ====
Multiple Mesopotamian planet names are preserved in Greek phonetic transcription in the fourth century CE lexicon compiled by Hesychius of Alexandria. He states that the "Chaldean" name of Venus was Delephat (Δελέφατ), a direct Greek transcription of Delebat. (Note: Hesychius refers to some of the Mesopotamian names he collected as "Chaldean" and other as "Babylonian".) Robert Stieglitz suggested that Hesychius might have depended on a now lost Hellenistic source which compiled knowledge from multiple Mesopotamian texts from different periods. It has been suggested that Greek mythographers might have been aware of the name Delebat as well, and that the name of Telephassa (Attic Telephatta; "far-shining"), the mother of Europa, might have been a derivative provided with a Greek etymology, though as noted by Stieglitz this would require a transfer of this term before the Hellenistic period.

==== Epiphanius of Salamis ====
Gary A. Rendsburg argues that Louēth (λουήθ), an otherwise unknown name of the planet Venus preserved in the Panarion of Epiphanius of Salamis, where it is described as Hebrew, (Note: Multiple Hebrew names of planets preserved by Epiphanius are absent from Hebrew sources, which according to Rendsburg might indicate that they belonged to the tradition of a hitherto unknown minor non-rabbinical stream of Judaism. Delebat and its derivatives in particular is absent from Hebrew sources, and is not attested in Phoenician either.) is derived from Mandaic Libat, and thus indirectly from Delebat. Rendsburg notes that the derivation is likely in the light of the well attested contact between Mandeans and Jews in late antiquity, and argues that the earlier proposal to derive Louēth from Lilith is implausible, as on phonetic grounds the lack of a second lambda would be difficult to explain; additionally, no Hebrew sources associate Lilith with the planet Venus or any deities linked to it, such as Greek Aphrodite.
