= Mul =

Mul or MUL may refer to:

- Minhaj University Lahore, a private university in Pakistan
- Mul of Kent, king of Kent
- Mul, Maharashtra, a town in the Indian state of Maharashtra
- Mul, Iran, a village in Ardabil Province, Iran
- Mul Rural LLG, Papua New Guinea
- Maruti Suzuki, formerly Maruti Udyog Limited, an Indian car maker
- Mul (fantasy race), offspring of humans and dwarves in the Dungeons & Dragons roleplaying game
- MUL 𒀯, the Sumerian for "star", see Babylonian star catalogues
- mul, ISO 639-2 and ISO 639-3 three-letter language code for multiple languages

== See also ==
- Mull (disambiguation)
