= Moulding =

Moulding is a surname. Notable people with the surname include:

- Colin Moulding (born 1955), English bassist, singer, and songwriter
- Harry Moulding (born 2000), English magician
- Matthew Moulding (born 1972), English businessman
- Roger Moulding (born 1958), English cricketer

== See also ==
- molding
