= James Mould =

James Mould may refer to:

- James Mould (politician) (1870–1944), politician in Alberta, Canada
- James Mould (lawyer) (1893–1958), English barrister
