= Low chronology =

Low chronology (or short chronology) may refer to:

- Low chronology of the ancient Near East
- Low chronology of the Eighteenth dynasty of Egypt
