= Babylonian star catalogues =

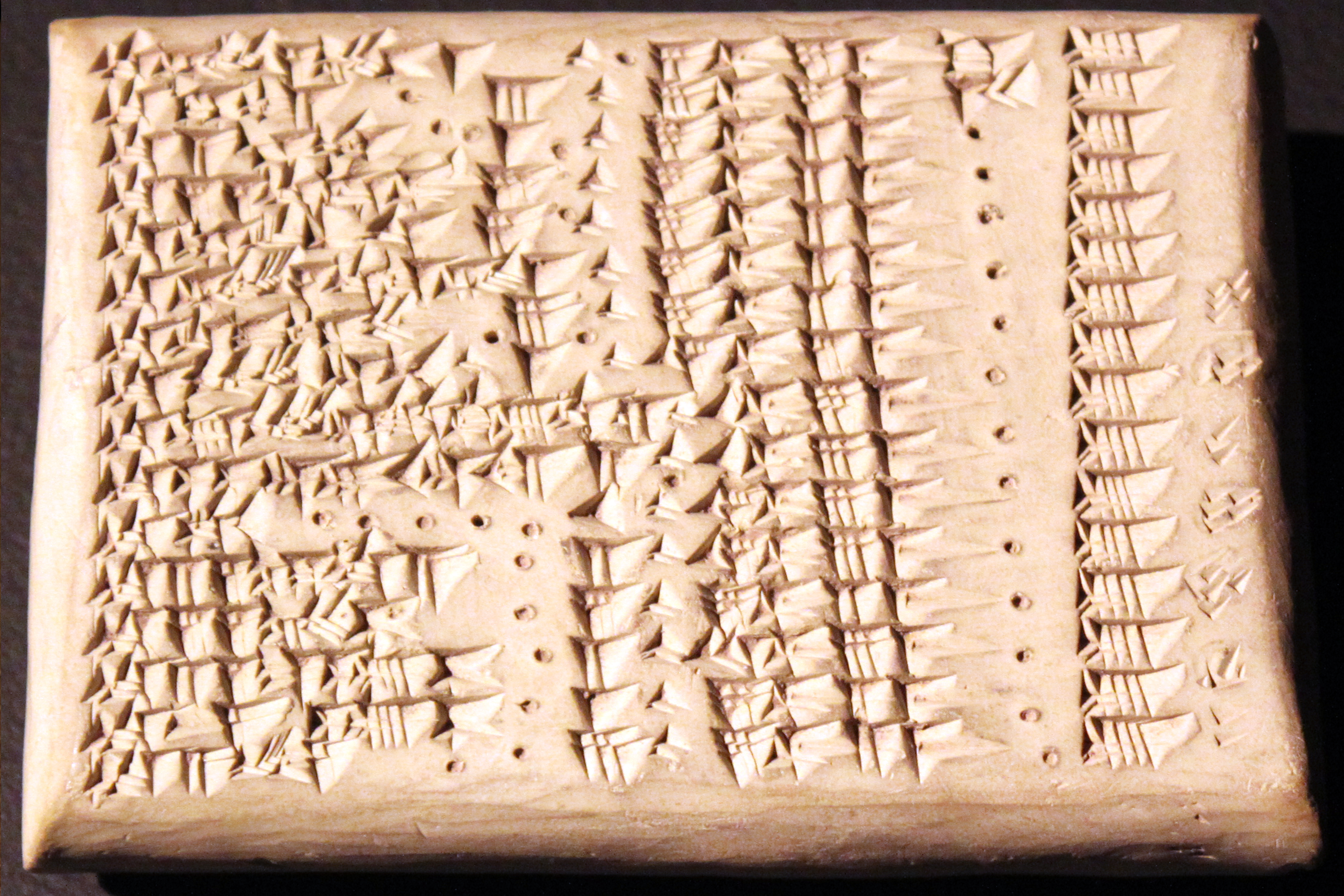
Star list with distance information, Uruk (Iraq), 3200-1500 BC, the list gives each constellation, the number of stars and the distance information to the next constellation in ells.

Babylonian astronomy collated earlier observations and divinations into sets of Babylonian star catalogues, during and after the Kassite rule over Babylonia. These star catalogues, written in cuneiform script, contained lists of constellations, individual stars, and planets. The constellations were probably collected from various other sources. The earliest catalogue, Three Stars Each, mentions stars of Akkad, of Amurru, of Elam and others. Various sources have theorized a Sumerian origin for these Babylonian constellations, but an Elamite origin has also been proposed. A connection to the star symbology of Kassite kudurru border stones has also been claimed, but whether such kudurrus really represented constellations and astronomical information aside from the use of the symbols remains unclear.

Star catalogues after Three Stars Each include the MUL.APIN list named after the first Babylonian constellation ^{MUL}APIN, "the Plough", which is the current constellation Triangulum plus Gamma Andromedae. It lists, among others, 17 or 18 constellations in the zodiac. Later catalogues reduce the zodiacal set of constellations to 12, which were borrowed by the Egyptians and the Greeks, still surviving among the modern constellations.

== Three Stars Each ==
The first formal compendia of star lists are the Three Stars Each texts appearing from about the twelfth century BC. They represent a tripartite division of the heavens: the northern hemisphere belonged to Enlil, the equator belonged to Anu, and the southern hemisphere belonged to Enki. The boundaries were at 17 degrees North and South, so that the Sun spent exactly three consecutive months in each third. The enumeration of stars in the Three Stars Each catalogues includes 36 stars, three for each month. The determiner glyph for "constellation" or "star" in these lists is MUL (𒀯), originally a pictograph of three stars, as it were a triplet of AN signs; e. g. the Pleiades are referred to as a "star cluster" or "star of stars" in the lists, written as MUL.MUL, or ^{MUL}MUL (𒀯𒀯).

== MUL.APIN ==
The second formal compendium of stars in Babylonian astronomy is the MUL.APIN, a pair of tablets named for their incipit, corresponding to the first constellation of the year, ^{MUL}APIN "The Plough", identified with Triangulum plus Gamma Andromedae. The list is a direct descendant of the Three Stars Each list, reworked around 1000 BC on the basis of more accurate observations. They include more constellations, including most circumpolar ones, and more of the zodiacal ones. The Babylonian star catalogues entered Greek astronomy in the 4th century BC, via Eudoxus of Cnidus and others. A few of the constellation names in use in modern astronomy can be traced to Babylonian sources via Greek astronomy. Among the most ancient constellations are those that marked the four cardinal points of the year in the Middle Bronze Age, i.e.

- Taurus "The Bull", from (𒀯𒄞𒀭𒈾) ^{MUL}GU_{4}.AN.NA "The Steer of Heaven", marking vernal equinox
- Leo "The Lion", from (𒀯𒌨) ^{MUL}UR.GU.LA "The Lion", marking summer solstice
- Scorpius "The Scorpion", from (𒀯𒄈𒋰) ^{MUL}GIR.TAB "The Scorpion", marking autumn equinox
- Capricornus "Goat-Horned", from (𒀯𒋦𒈧𒄩) ^{MUL}SUḪUR.MAŠ "The Goat-Fish", marking winter solstice. It is a mythological hybrid depicted on boundary stones from before 2000 BC as a symbol of Ea.

There are other constellation names which can be traced to Bronze Age origins, including Gemini "The Twins", from (𒀯𒈦𒋰𒁀𒃲𒃲) ^{MUL}MAŠ.TAB.BA.GAL.GAL "The Great Twins", Cancer "The Crab", from (𒀯𒀠𒇻) ^{MUL}AL.LUL "The Crayfish", among others.

The MUL.APIN gives

- a catalogue of 71 stars and constellations of the "Three Ways" of the Three Stars Each tradition. The star names (prefixed with MUL 𒀯) are listed with the associated deity (prefix DINGIR 𒀭) and often some other brief epithet.
- dates of heliacal risings
- pairs of constellations which rise and set simultaneously
- time-intervals between dates of heliacal risings
- pairs of constellations which are simultaneously at the zenith and at the horizon
- the path of the moon and planets.
- a solar calendar
- the planets and the durations of their solar conjunctions
- stellar risings and planetary positions for predicting weather and for adjusting the calendar
- telling time by length of the gnomon shadow
- length of night watches during the year
- omens connected with the appearance of stars, planets, MUL.U.RI.RI (comets?), and winds.

== Zodiacal constellations ==
The path of the Moon as given in MUL.APIN consists of 17 or 18 stations, recognizable as the direct predecessors of the 12 sign zodiac. At the beginning of the list with MUL.MUL, the Pleiades, corresponds to the situation in the Early to Middle Bronze Age when the Sun at vernal equinox was close to the Pleiades in Taurus (closest in the 23rd century BCE), and not yet in Aries.

	Sumerian	Akkadian	Translation	Western Equivalent
1.	^{MUL}MUL - 𒀯𒀯	zappu	"The Star Cluster (Star of Stars)" or "The Bristle"	the Pleiades
2.	^{MUL}GU_{4}.AN.NA - 𒀯𒄞𒀭𒈾	alû/lê	"The Bull of Heaven"	Taurus and Hyades
3.	^{MUL}SIPA.ZI.AN.NA - 𒀯𒉺𒇻𒍣𒀭𒈾	šitaddaru or šidallu	"The Loyal Shepherd of Heaven"	Orion
4.	^{MUL}ŠU.GI - 𒀯𒋗𒄀	šību	"The Old One"	Perseus
5.	^{MUL}ZUBI or ^{MUL}GAM_{3} - 𒀯𒉽𒈿	gamlu	"The Scimitar" or "The Crook"	Auriga
6.	^{MUL}MAŠ.TAB.BA(.GAL.GAL) - 𒀯𒈦𒋰𒁀(𒃲𒃲)	māšu or tū'āmū rabûtu	"The (Great) Twins"	Gemini
7.	^{MUL}AL.LUL - 𒀯𒀠𒈜	alluttu	"The Crayfish"	Cancer
8.	1. ^{MUL}UR.GU.LA - 𒀯𒌨𒄖𒆷; 2. ^{MUL}UR.MAḪ - 𒀯𒌨𒈤	urgulû or nēšu	1. "The Creator"; 2. "The Lion"	Leo
9.	^{MUL}ABSIN_{3} - 𒀯𒀳	absinnu or šer'u	"The Seed-Furrow"	Virgo
10.	1. ^{MUL}ZI.BA.AN.NA - 𒀯𒍣𒁀𒀭𒈾; 2. ^{MUL}GIŠ.ERIN_{2} - 𒀯𒄑𒂟	zibānītu	"The Scales"	Libra
11.	^{MUL}GIR_{2}.TAB - 𒀯𒄈𒋰	zuqaqīpu	"The Cutter"	Scorpius
12.	^{MUL}PA.BIL_{2}.SAG - 𒀯𒉺𒉋𒊕	pabilsaĝ	"The God Pabilsaĝ" or "The Overseer"	Sagittarius
13.	^{MUL}SUḪUR.MAŠ_{2}(.KU_{6}) - 𒀯𒋦𒈧(𒄩)	suḫurmāšu	"The Goat-Fish"	Capricorn
14.	^{MUL}GU.LA - 𒀯𒄖𒆷	ṣinundu, ku-ur-ku or rammanu	"The Great One"	Aquarius
15.	1. ^{MUL}KUN.^{MEŠ} - 𒀯𒆲𒎌; 2. ^{MUL}ZIB.ME - 𒀯𒍦𒈨	zibbātu or zibbāt sinūnūtu	"The Tails"	Pisces
16.	^{MUL}ŠIM_{2}.MAḪ - 𒀯𒋆𒈤	šinūnūtu	"The Great Swallow"	SW Pisces and Epsilon Pegasi
17.	1. ^{MUL}A.NU.NI.TUM - 𒀯𒀀𒉡𒉌𒌈; 2. ^{MUL}LU.LIM - 𒀯𒇻𒅆	anunītu or lulīmu	"The Goddess Anunitu" or "The Stag"	NE Pisces and Andromeda
18.	^{MUL}(LU_{2}.)ḪUĜ(.GA_{2}) - 𒀯𒇽𒂠𒂷	agru	"The Farm Worker"	Aries

The "Tail" and the "Great Swallow" (items 15 and 16 above) have also been read as a single constellation the "Tail of the Swallow" (Pisces). This is the source of the uncertainty over the number of constellations — 17 or 18 — in the Babylonian "zodiac". All constellations of the Iron Age 12-sign zodiac are present among them, most of them with names that clearly identify them, while some reached Greek astronomy with altered names; thus "Furrow" became Virgo, "Pabilsag" Sagittarius, "Great One" Aquarius, "Swallow Tail" Pisces and "Farm Worker" was reinterpreted as Aries.

Virgo, and her main star Spica, have Babylonian precedents. The MUL.APIN associates Absin "The Furrow" with the Sumerian goddess Shala, and on boundary stones of the Kassite era Shala is conventionally depicted as holding a length of grain. Regarding Sagittarius, Pabilsag is a comparatively obscure Sumerian god, later identified with Ninurta. Another name for the constellation was Nebu "The Soldier".

Aquarius "The Water-Pourer" represents Ea (a water god), dubbed "The Great One" in the MUL.APIN. It contained the winter solstice in the Early Bronze Age. In Greek astronomy, he became represented as simply a single vase from which a stream poured down to Piscis Austrinus. The name in the Hindu zodiac is likewise kumbha "water-pitcher", showing that the zodiac reached India via Greek intermediaries.

The current definition of Pisces is the youngest of the zodiacal constellations. The "Swallow" of Babylonian astronomy included the western fish, but was larger as it included as well parts of Pegasus. The square of Pegasus was the constellation of the "field", shown in the Dendera zodiac between the two fishes. The northern fish and part of Andromeda represented the goddess Anunitum, the "Lady of the Heaven". Late Babylonian sources mention also DU.NU.NU "The Fish-Cord". It is unclear how the "Farm Worker" of the MUL.APIN became Aries "The Ram" of Greek tradition, possibly by a pun or misunderstanding.

Somewhere around the 5th century BCE, Babylonian astronomical texts began to describe the positions of the Sun, Moon, and planets in terms of 12 equally-spaced signs, each one associated with a zodiacal constellation, each divided into 30 degrees (uš). This normalized zodiac is fixed to the stars and totals 360 degrees.

== See also ==
- Babylonian astrology
- Babylonian calendar
- Constellation
- Enuma Anu Enlil
- Triple deity
- Venus tablet of Ammisaduqa
