= Moldemarka =

Recreational area in Norway

Coordinates: 62.7484°N 7.1261°E

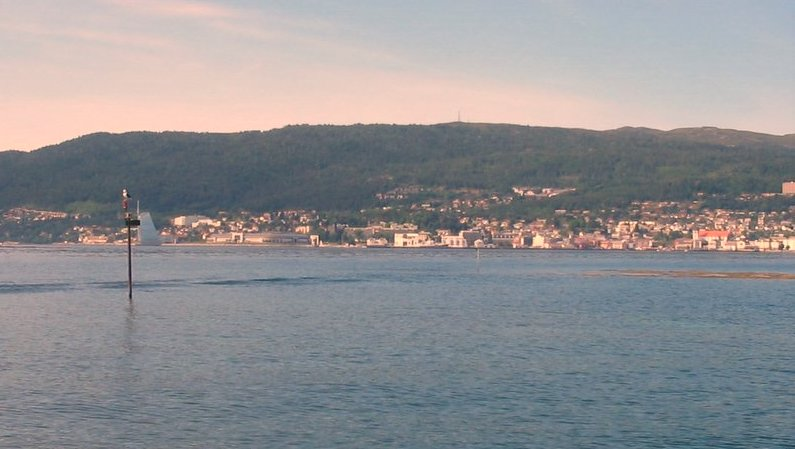
View of Moldemarka behind the city

Moldemarka is a 30-square-kilometre (12 sq mi) hilly and mostly wooded recreational area north of Molde in Molde Municipality, Møre og Romsdal county, Norway. The area is known for the Molde panorama, with views of more than 222 rugged and partly snow-clad peaks, mountainous islands, green hills, and the North Atlantic Ocean to the north and west. Moldemarka and Varden grew to international fame at the turn of the 20th century, with the German Kaiser Wilhelm II and the Prince of Wales as regular visitors.

Moldemarka, which is protected public land, is an all-year recreational area with a network of paths, walking trails and skiing tracks. Forest roads access the area from several directions, with bulletin boards with maps and information about local plants and wildlife. Marked trails lead to a number of peaks, with Frænavarden (588 metres or 1,929 feet) as the more popular destination, and to numerous lakes and rivers, including the lake Moldevatnet and the river Moldeelva. A national fishing permit is required.

The eastern part of Moldemarka is accessible from the Nordbyen neighborhood in the city of Molde, while access to the western parts, is easier from Kvam, Kringstad, and Bjørset. During the winter, there are approximately 10 kilometres (6.2 mi) of prepared skiing tracks, with about 7 kilometres (4.3 mi) of lighted tracks. The "classic" route starts at the Romsdal Museum, runs by Storlihytta, and ends on the top of the hill, at the restaurant on Varden (407 metres or 1,335 feet). The walk takes about one hour. Walking maps for Moldemarka are also available in local book stores.
