= Nibiru (Babylonian astronomy) =

Hypothetical planet

Nibiru (also transliterated Neberu, Nebiru) is a term in the Akkadian language, translating to "crossing" or "point of transition", especially of rivers, i.e., river crossings or ferry-boats. While the nature of the "crossing" in astronomy has "long been a source of confusion in scholarly and popular opinion", in a 2015 report for the Cuneiform Digital Library Bulletin, Immanuel Freedman analyzed the extant cuneiform evidence and concluded that the hypothesis that the name Nēbiru may be assigned to any visible astronomical object that marks an equinox is supported by cuneiform evidence.

== Role in Babylonian cosmology ==
Nibiru was considered the seat of the summus deus who shepherds the stars like sheep, in Babylon identified with Marduk. The establishment of the nibiru point is described in tablet 5 of the creation epic Enûma Eliš: “When Marduk fixed the locations (manzazu) of Nibiru, Enlil and Ea in the sky".

The Enûma Eliš states:

Nibiru is [Marduk's] star, which he made appear in the heavens... [130-131] The stars of heaven, let him [Nibiru] set their course; let him shepherd all the gods like sheep.

Nibiru is described more closely on a complete cuneiform tablet:

Nibiru, which is said to have occupied the passageways of heaven and earth, because everyone above and below asks Nibiru if they cannot find the passage. Nibiru is Marduk's star which the gods in heaven caused to be visible. Nibiru stands as a post at the turning point. The others say of Nibiru the post: "The one who crosses the middle of the sea (Tiamat) without calm, may his name be Nibiru, for he takes up the center of it." The path of the stars of the sky should be kept unchanged.

Böhl calls the text "objectively the most difficult passage, although it has been handed down in its entirety. The Nibiru tablet does not provide any essential help for the clarification."

In the enumerations, Nibiru is mentioned at different astronomical locations in conjunction with the positions of stars and planets, mostly as the "star of Marduk", however, the various stars or planets were not subject to any fixed interpretation. For example, the "star of Ea" was described at various "revelation spots" including Vela, Fomalhaut, and Venus. Similar interpretations were made for the other "stars of the gods", so multiple celestial coordinates must be considered. Nibiru has been associated with the area of Libra. The Nibiru constellation rose in the month of Tišritum, around autumnal equinox. However Nibiru was also a name for the planet Jupiter when observed in the month of Tišritum. In the MUL.APIN, Nibiru is identified as Jupiter:

When the stars of Enlil have been finished, one big star – although its light is dim – divides the sky in half and stands there: that is, the star of Marduk (MUL ^{d}AMAR.UD), Nibiru (né-bé-ru), Jupiter (^{MUL}SAG.ME.GAR); it keeps changing its position and crosses the sky.

Conversely, Tablets K.6174:9’ and K.12769:6’ refer to it as Mercury: "If Mercury (^{MUL}UDU.IDIM.GU_{4}) divides the sky and stands there, [its name] is Nibiru."
