= Moldevatnet =

Lake in Møre og Romsdal, Norway

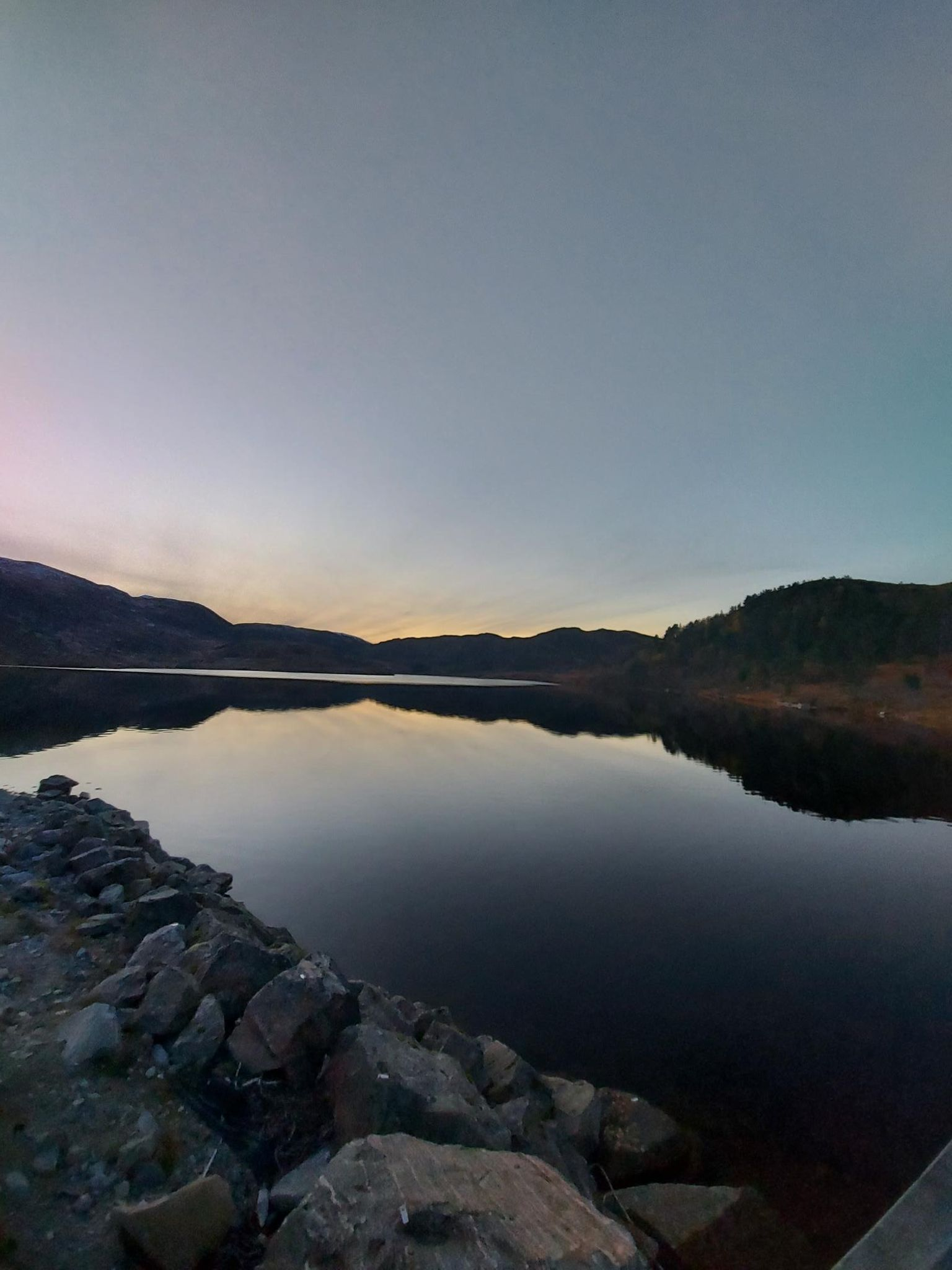
- Interactive map of the lake
- Location: Molde Municipality, Møre og Romsdal
- Coordinates: 62.77608°N 7.18411°E
- Type: Reservoir
- Primary outflows: Moldeelva
- Catchment area: Moldemarka
- Basin countries: Norway
- Max. length: 835 metres (2,740 ft)
- Max. width: 350 metres (1,150 ft)
- Surface area: 0.19 square kilometres (0.073 sq mi)
- Surface elevation: 343 metres (1,125 ft)
- References: NVE

Moldevatnet (lit. 'Lake Molde') is the main reservoir and water supply for the city of Molde in Molde Municipality in Møre og Romsdal county, Norway. The 19-hectare (47-acre) lake is the source of the river Moldeelva and it is located about 4 kilometres (2.5 mi) north of the city, and the north end lies about 200 metres (660 ft) southeast of the border with Hustadvika Municipality.

== See also ==
- List of lakes in Norway
