= Mold (surname) =

Mold is a surname. Notable people with the surname include:

- Arthur Mold (1863-1921), English cricketer
- Carlos Mold (1885-?), Argentine rugby union and cricket player
- Johnny Mold, America snowmobile racer
- Stephen Mold, elected Northamptonshire Police and Crime Commissioner in 2016

== See also ==
- Mould (surname)
