= Mulling =

Mulling may refer to:

- Mulling (spectroscopy), a sample preparation technique
- Mulling spices, a spice mixture
- Book of Mulling, an early Irish manuscript

== See also ==
- Mull (disambiguation)
- Mullings, a surname
- Mulled wine, a hot alcoholic beverage
