= Mull =

Mull may refer to:

== Places ==
- Isle of Mull, a Scottish island in the Inner Hebrides
  - Sound of Mull, between the Isle of Mull and the rest of Scotland
- Mount Mull, Antarctica
- Mull Hill, Isle of Man
- Mull, Arkansas, a place along Arkansas Highway 14
- Mull of Galloway, a promontory in Wigtownshire, and the southernmost point in Scotland
- Mull of Kintyre, the southwesternmost tip of the Kintyre Peninsula in Scotland

== Other uses ==
- Mull (geographical term), a hill or promontory
- Mull (surname)
- Mull (film), a 1989 Australian film featuring Nadine Garner
- Chicken mull, a traditional American dish from Carolina and Georgia
- Mulling (spectroscopy), a technique of preparing a solid for infrared spectroscopy
- Mull, a character in Atelier Iris: Eternal Mana
- Mull, the gauze used in bookbinding

== See also ==
- Empire Mull, ship
- Mul (disambiguation)
- Mull 34, sailing yacht
- Mull Covered Bridge, near Burgoon, Ohio, on the National Register of Historic Places
- Mull House and Cemetery, New York, on the National Register of Historic Places
- Mulled wine, heated and spiced wine
