= Moulds (surname) =

Moulds is a surname. Notable people with the surname include:

- Christopher Moulds, English operatic conductor
- Eric Moulds (born 1973), American footballer
- George Moulds (born 1983), English cricketer
- Gordon Moulds, British Royal Air Force officer
- Maxwell Sydney Moulds (born 1941), Australian entomologist

== See also ==
- Mould (surname)
