= Venus tablet of Ammisaduqa =

Babylonian astronomical tablet

Venus tablet of Ammi-Saduqa
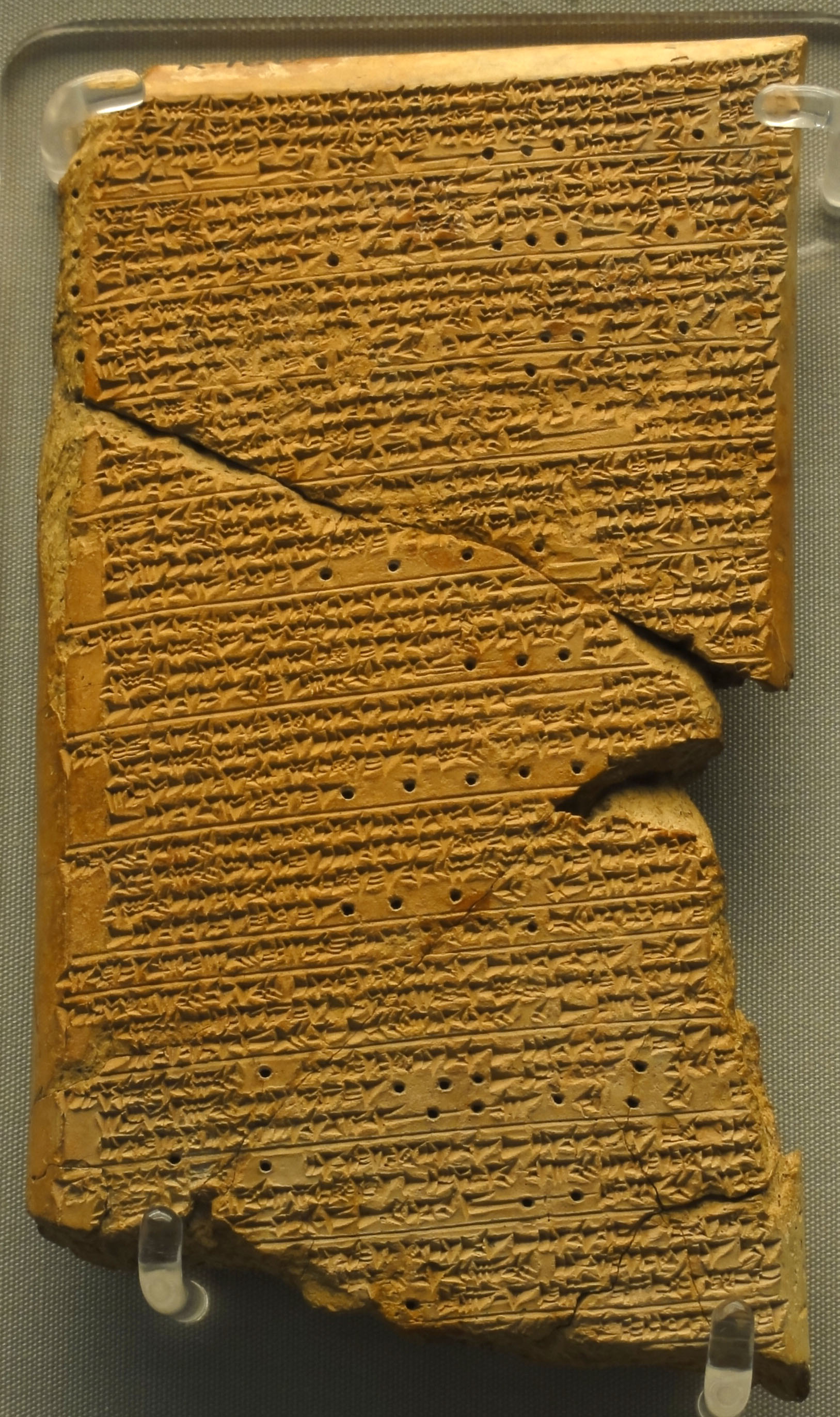
- Material: Clay
- Length: 9.2 cm (3.6 in)
- Height: 17.14 cm (6.75 in)
- Width: 2.22 cm (0.87 in)
- Created: c. 1650 BC
- Present location: British Museum, England, United Kingdom
- Registration: K.160

The Venus tablet of Ammi-Saduqa (Enuma Anu Enlil Tablet 63) is the record of astronomical positions for Venus, as preserved in numerous cuneiform tablets dating from the first millennium BC. Scholars believe that this astronomical record was first compiled during the reign of King Ammi-Saduqa, the fourth ruler after Hammurabi. Thus, the origins of this text could probably be dated to around the mid-seventeenth century BC (according to the Middle Chronology) despite allowing two possible dates.

The tablet gives the rise times of Venus and its first and last visibility on the horizon before or after sunrise and sunset (the heliacal risings and settings of Venus) in the form of lunar dates. These positions are given for a period of 21 years.

== Sources ==
This Venus tablet is part of Enuma Anu Enlil ("In the days of Anu and Enlil"), a long text dealing with Babylonian astrology, which mostly consists of omens in the form of celestial phenomena.

The earliest copy of this tablet to be published, a 7th-century BC cuneiform, part of the British Museum collections, was recovered from the library at Nineveh. It was first published in 1870 by Henry Creswicke Rawlinson and George Smith as Enuma Anu Enlil Tablet 63, in "Tablet of Movements of the Planet Venus and their Influences" (The Cuneiform Inscriptions of Western Asia, volume III).

As many as 20 copies of this text are currently on record, many of them fragmentary, falling into 6 groups. The oldest of these copies is believed to be Source "B", found at Kish in 1924. It was copied from a tablet written at Babylon while Sargon II was King of Assyria between 720 and 704 BC.

== Interpretation ==
Several dates for the original omens, as contained in the tablet, were proposed early in the 20th century. The following dates, corresponding to the High, Middle, Low, and Ultra-Low Chronologies, were inferred for the beginning of the Venus positions: 1702 BC, 1646 BC, 1638 BC, 1582 BC, and 1550 BC, respectively.

The tablet's significance for corroborating Babylonian chronology was first recognised by Franz Kugler in 1912, when he succeeded in identifying the enigmatic "Year of the Golden Throne" ("Venus" tablet K.160) as potentially the 8th year of the reign of Ammi-Saduqa, based on one of his year names. Since then, this 7th-century BC copy has been variously interpreted to support several chronologies in the 2nd millennium BC.

Many uncertainties remain about the interpretation of the record of astronomical positions of Venus, as preserved in these surviving tablets. Some copying corruptions are probable. Problems of atmospheric refraction were addressed by Vahe Gurzadyan in a 2003 publication. The entry for some years, notably 13 and 21 are not physically possible and are considered in error. Also, the tables used to calculate the heliacal rising of Venus assume a rate at which the earth is slowing, a rate which is not certain, causing "clock-time errors".

== See also ==
- Babylonian astronomy
- Chronology of the ancient Near East
- Short chronology
