= Molde (disambiguation) =

Molde may also refer to:

== People ==
- Al Molde, a former college Athletics Director and American football coach
- Isa Molde, a Filipino volleyball player
- Ivar Molde, a Norwegian politician for the Christian Democratic Party

== Places ==
=== Norway ===
- Molde Municipality, a municipality in Møre og Romsdal county, Norway.
- Molde (town), a town in Molde Municipality in Møre og Romsdal county, Norway
- Molde Cathedral, a cathedral in Molde Municipality in Møre og Romsdal county, Norway
- Molde Airport, Årø, an airport in Molde Municipality in Møre og Romsdal county, Norway
- Molde Archipelago, an island group in Molde Municipality in Møre og Romsdal county, Norway
- Molde University College, a college in Molde Municipality in Møre og Romsdal county, Norway
- Molde (river), a river in Molde Municipality in Møre og Romsdal county, Norway

=== Romania ===
- Molde or Baia, a commune in the Suceava County, Romania

== Sports ==
- Molde FK, an association football club in Molde, Norway
- Molde Elite, a handball club in Molde, Norway
