= Molding =

Moulding or molding may refer to:

- Molding (decorative) or coving, a decorative feature along walls and ceilings, formed from marble, plaster, wood, stone etc.
- Molding (process), in manufacturing
- Automotive molding
- Mold (cooking implement)

== See also ==
- Mold (disambiguation)
