= Mould (surname) =

Mould is a surname. Notable people with the surname include:

- Alex Mould, Ghanaian politician
- Bob Mould (born 1960), American musician with alternative rock bands Hüsker Dü and Sugar
- Brooks K. Mould, American music publisher
- Billy Mould (1919-1999), English footballer
- Jacob Wrey Mould (1825-1886), English-born architect, illustrator, linguist and musician
- James Mould (politician) (1870–1944), politician in Alberta, Canada
- James Mould (lawyer) (1893–1958), English barrister
- Jeremy Mould (born 1949), Australian astronomer
- John Mould (1910-1957), Australian Navy officer and recipient of the George Cross
- Jon Mould (born 1991), Welsh racing cyclist
- Philip Mould (born 1960), English art dealer and historian
- Peter "Boy" Mould (1916-1941), British Royal Air Force Second World War flying ace
- Quita Mould, archaeologist
- Reece Mould (born 1994), English boxer
- Roslyn Mould, Vice President of Humanist International
- Steve Mould, British science presenter

== See also ==
- Betty Mould-Iddrisu, Ghanaian lawyer and politician
- Moulds (surname)
