= Molde (river) =

Molde River Moldeelva (Norwegian)
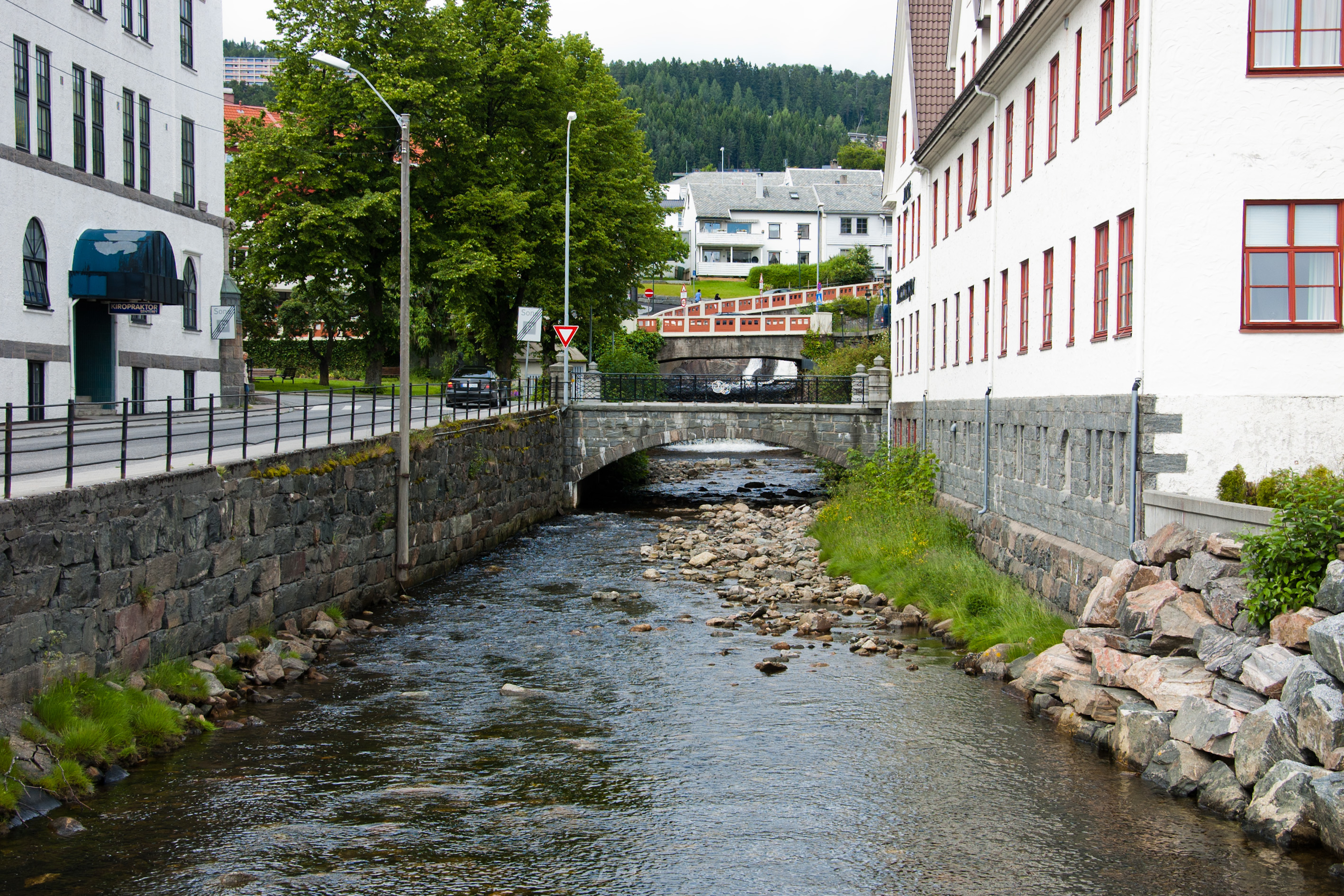
- Interactive map of the river

Location
- Country: Norway
- County: Møre og Romsdal
- Municipalities: Molde Municipality

Physical characteristics
- Source: Lake Molde
  - location: Molde, Norway
  - coordinates: 62.77448°N 7.1935397°E
  - elevation: 343 metres (1,125 ft)
- Mouth: Molde Fjord
  - location: Molde, Norway
  - coordinates: 62.736918°N 7.164255°E
  - elevation: 0 metres (0 ft)
- Length: 5 km (3.1 mi)

Molde River (English) or Moldeelva (Norwegian) is a river in Molde Municipality in Møre og Romsdal county, Norway. The 5-kilometre (3.1 mi) long river runs through the Moldemarka area and then through the city of Molde. Its origins are found at Lake Molde (Norwegian: Moldevatnet). It follows the Molde Valley (Norwegian: Moldedalen) on its way to the Molde Fjord (Norwegian: Moldefjord). The approximately 5-kilometre (3.1 mi) river is crossed by several bridges.

Although the river is minor and seasonal, there were several sawmills along its course in the 17th and 18th centuries. This gave rise to the city itself through a combination of a good harbour, proximity to the sea routes, vast timber resources, and a river capable of supporting mills.

In 1909, the river also housed the first hydroelectric power plant capable of providing sufficient electricity to the city. Much of the drinking water for the city comes from the upper part of the river. During the reconstruction after the fire of 1916, the lower part of the river and the estuary is controlled by a dam, built just north of the city, which also serves as a reservoir and water supply reserve.

== See also ==
- List of rivers in Norway
