= Mull (surname) =

Mull is a surname. Notable people with the surname include:

- Brandon Mull (born 1974), American writer
- Carter Mull (born 1977), American artist
- Clay Mull (born 1979), American speed skater
- Gary Mull (1937–1993), American yacht designer
- J. Bazzel Mull (1914–2006), American religious broadcaster
- Jack Mull (born 1943), American baseball player, coach and manager
- Martin Mull (1943-2024), American actor
- Pres Mull (1922–2005), American football coach
- Stephen Mull (born 1958), American diplomat
