= Mull 34 =

Sailing yacht designed by Gary Mull

The Mull 34 is a sailing yacht designed by Gary Mull under the International Offshore Rule. The design, although similar in many ways to Mull's Ranger 22 design, is striking for its wide beam, carried well aft, and the quintessential IOR transom.

Several Mull 34's have been built to the Swampfire design:

New Orleans Marine built Swampfire in 1974 using Bill Seemann's C-Flex system. Swampfire went on to win every race in the 1974 ¾-ton world championships, establishing C-Flex as the material of choice for amateurs building one-off sailboat hulls.

A Michigan family built Soma 3 in 1978 for racing on the Great Lakes, and she carries the Detroit River Yacht-racing Association sail number of 25777. The family donated Soma 3 to the Hoofer Sailing Club in 1989. Club members in 1996 painted the boat with its iconic cow spots as a practical joke, a riff on the notion that the boat "sails like a cow" due to its wide beam. The joke stuck, and the boat has become a local landmark, even gracing the cover of the 2004 State of Wisconsin highway map. Other Swampfire designs were built on the West Coast for the Victoria 3/4 Ton Championships - a GRP version named Impatience and an alloy version named New Infidel. Neither did very well as the design was quite outdated for top-level competition by then.
