= James Mould (lawyer) =

James Mould QC
- Born: 21 September 1893
- Died: 2 April 1958 (aged 64)
- Education: Bedford Modern School
- Alma mater: University College, London

James Mould QC (21 September 1893 – 2 April 1958) was an English barrister, Queen's Counsel, a bencher of Gray's Inn and a fellow of University College London. In 1944, Mould served on the Swan Committee on the Patents and Designs Acts and, in 1947, served as a member of the Committee appointed by the Minister of Supply to inquire into the development and production of Tudor aircraft.

== Early life ==
Mould was born on 21 September 1893, the son of John Thomas Mould of Bury, Lancashire. He was educated at Bedford Modern School and University College London. He qualified as an electrical engineer, obtaining a Ph.D in 1921. He was later called to the Bar at Gray's Inn in 1923, building on his knowledge as an engineer by specialising in patent and design cases.

== Career ==
Mould built his career as a barrister around patent and design cases. In 1944, Mould served on the Swan Committee on the Patents and Designs Acts and, in 1947, served as a member of the Committee appointed by the Minister of Supply to inquire into the development and production of Tudor aircraft. Of Mould's career as a patent barrister, a tribute published in The Times on 11 April 1958 stated: With this happy and gregarious disposition he combined a conscientious devotion to his specialized field of activity…and an unswerving acceptance of the high Victorian standards of work and duty in which he had been educated.

Mould was made King's Counsel in 1948 and a bencher of Gray's Inn in 1950. In his will, Mould created a scholarship for pupillage candidates at Gray's Inn.

== Family life ==
In 1928 he married Alice May Hunt. He died on 2 April 1958; a widow and a daughter survived him. A tribute to Mould was published in The Times on 11 April 1958, written by someone with whom he had shared chambers for twenty years: At the end of a hard day in Court or a lengthy conference his happy stories and cheerful laughter would bubble up fresh and spontaneous when the strain of work was relieved.
