= Babylonian astrology =

Babylonian astrology was the first known organized system of astrology, arising in the second millennium BC.

In Babylon as well as in Assyria as a direct offshoot of Babylonian culture, astrology takes its place as one of the two chief means at the disposal of the priests (who were called bare or "inspectors") for ascertaining the will and intention of the gods, the other being the inspection of the livers of sacrificial animals (haruspicy).

== Early origins ==
There is speculation that astrology of some form appeared in the Sumerian period in the 3rd millennium BC, but the isolated references to ancient celestial omens dated to this period are not considered sufficient evidence to demonstrate an integrated theory of astrology. The history of scholarly celestial divination is therefore generally reported to begin with late Old Babylonian texts (c. 1800 BC), continuing through the Middle Babylonian and Middle Assyrian periods (c. 1200 BC).

By the 16th century BC, the extensive employment of omen-based astrology is evident in the compilation of a comprehensive reference work known as Enuma Anu Enlil. Its contents consisted of 70 cuneiform tablets comprising 7,000 celestial omens. Texts from this time also refer to an oral tradition – the origin and content of which can only be speculated upon. At this time Babylonian astrology was solely mundane, and prior to the 7th century BC the practitioners' understanding of astronomy was fairly rudimentary. Because of their inability to accurately predict future celestial phenomena and planetary movement very far in advance, interpretations were done as the phenomena occurred or slightly before. By the 4th century BC, however, their mathematical methods had progressed enough to calculate future planetary positions with reasonable accuracy, at which point extensive ephemerides began to appear.

== Divinatory basis ==
The history of Babylonian astrology shows the development of astronomical knowledge within the context of divination. A collection of 32 tablets with inscribed liver models, dating from about 1875 BC, are the oldest known detailed texts of Babylonian divination, and these demonstrate the same interpretational format as that employed in celestial omen analysis. Blemishes and marks found on the liver of the sacrificial animal were interpreted as symbolic signs which presented messages from the gods to the king.

The gods were also believed to present themselves in the celestial images of the planets or stars with whom they were associated. Evil celestial omens attached to any particular planet were therefore seen as indications of dissatisfaction or disturbance of the god that planet represented. Such indications were met with attempts to appease the god and find manageable ways by which the god's expression could be realised without significant harm to the king and his nation. An astronomical report to the king Esarhaddon concerning the lunar eclipse of 18 January 672 BC shows how the ritualistic use of substitute kings, or substitute events, combined an unquestioning belief in magic and omens with a purely mechanical view that the astrological event must have some kind of correlate within the natural world:

... In the beginning of the year a flood will come and break the dikes. When the Moon has made the eclipse, the king, my lord, should write to me. As a substitute for the king, I will cut through a dike, here in Babylonia, in the middle of the night. No one will know about it.

Ulla Koch-Westenholz, in her 1995 book Mesopotamian Astrology, argues that this ambivalence between a theistic and mechanic worldview defines the Babylonian concept of celestial divination as one which, despite its heavy reliance on magic, remains free of implications of targeted punishment with the purpose of revenge, and so "shares some of the defining traits of modern science: it is objective and value-free, it operates according to known rules, and its data are considered universally valid and can be looked up in written tabulations". Koch-Westenholz also establishes the most important distinction between ancient Babylonian astrology and other divinatory disciplines as being that the former was originally exclusively mundane, being geographically oriented and specifically applied to countries cities and nations, and almost wholly concerned with the welfare of the state and the king as the governing head of the nation.

== Planets and gods ==
The Patron God of Babylon was Marduk, and this god was recognized in Babylonian astrology as the planet Jupiter. Marduk was recognized as the most powerful god, but not the one and only god. The Babylonians were polytheistic, believing in many gods with different purposes, and they associated certain gods with certain planets.

The Babylonians used horoscopic astrology. By observing the seasonal movement of the sun, moon, and planets, especially related omens (e.g. lunar eclipses), the Babylonians connected their beliefs of divine intervention to social, political, and environmental problems, such as giving birth to deformed children.

The Babylonians believed their gods' activities influenced their own lives. These celestial events were viewed by the Babylonians as divine intervention in their lives using the influence of the Sun, Moon, and planets, and to communicate when bad or good events were going to occur. Horoscopic astrology is significant to Babylonian beliefs, because associating the sun, moon, and planets with their gods shaped the way the Babylonians lived their lives and viewed the world around them. The parallels between horoscopes and nativity omens from a Seleucid tablet shows the benefic ("good-doing") and malefic ("evil-doing") natures of the planets in Babylonian astrology. The Babylonians associated and created their beliefs around planets based on the nature of the god associated with it. Planets were believed to have influences and provide guidance to humans, as they lived their lives. The planet's nature determines whether it is benefic or malefic.

The Babylonians divided the fixed stars into three groups: the stars of Anu, Enlil and Ea. The group to which they belonged depended, for most, on where they rose on the Eastern horizon which was divided into the Paths of Anu, Enlil and Ea.

Five planets were recognized: Jupiter, Venus, Saturn, Mercury and Mars, to name them in the order in which they appear in the older cuneiform literature; in later texts Mercury and Saturn change places.

The planets were identified with the gods of the Babylonian pantheon as follows:

- Jupiter with Marduk,
- Venus with the goddess Ishtar,
- Saturn with Ninurta (Ninib),
- Mercury with Nabu (Nebo),
- Mars with Nergal.

The movements of the sun, moon and planets were regarded as representing the activity of the five gods, together with the moon-god/goddess Sin/Selardi and the Sun-god Shamash, in preparing the occurrences on Earth. If therefore one could correctly read and interpret the activity of these powers, one knew what the gods were aiming to bring about.

== System of interpretation ==
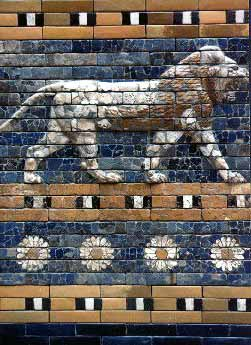
Detail of the Ishtar Gate in Babylon

The Babylonian priests accordingly applied themselves to the task of perfecting a system of interpretation of the phenomena to be observed in the heavens, and it was natural that the system was extended from the Moon, Sun and five planets to the more prominent and recognizable fixed stars.

The interpretations themselves were based (as in the case of divination through the liver) chiefly on two factors:

- On the recollection or on written records of what in the past had taken place when the phenomenon or phenomena in question had been observed, and
- Association of ideas—involving sometimes merely a play upon words—in connection with the phenomenon or phenomena observed.

Thus, if on a certain occasion, the rise of the new moon in a cloudy sky was followed by victory over an enemy or by abundant rain, the sign in question was thus proved to be a favourable one and its recurrence would thenceforth be regarded as a good omen, though the prognostication would not necessarily be limited to the one or the other of those occurrences, but might be extended to apply to other circumstances.

On the other hand, the appearance of the new moon earlier than was expected was regarded as unfavourable – prognosticating in one case defeat, in another death among cattle, in a third bad crops – not necessarily because these events actually took place after such a phenomenon, but by an application of the general principle resting upon association of ideas whereby anything premature would suggest an unfavourable occurrence.

In this way a mass of traditional interpretation of all kinds of observed phenomena was gathered, and once gathered became a guide to the priests for all times. However, not all of these ideas are still used in astrology as it is usually practiced today.

=== Astral medicine ===
Astrology was also incredibly important in a practice known as astral medicine. According to a kalendartext discovered, belonging to a mašmaššu priest in the late Babylonian period of Uruk named Iqīšâ, different remedies are created for patients for different days, depending on the date.

Month IV: First twelve lines of Iqīšâ's kalendartexte
1	Aries	7	Sheep-blood, sheep-fat, and sheep-hair, you anoint.
2	Capricorn	14	Goat-blood, goat-fat, and goat hair, you anoint.
3	Libra	21	"Empty place", you anoint.
4	Cancer	28	Crab-blood, or crab-fat, you anoint.
5	Taurus	5	Bull-blood, or bull-fat, or bull-hair, you anoint.
6	Aquarius	12	Eagle-head, wing, and blood, you anoint.
7	Scorpio	19	"Empty place", you anoint.
8	Leo	26	Lion-blood, lion-fat, or lion-hair, you anoint.
9	Gemini	3	Rooster-head, blood, and wing, you anoint.
10	Pisces	10	Dove-head, blood, swallow-head, blood, you anoint.
11	Sagittarius	17	Anzu(-bird?)-head, Anzu(-bird?)-wing, Anzu(-bird)-blood, you anoint.
12	Virgo	24	šigušu-barley-flour, raven-head, and raven-wing, you anoint.

Steele acknowledges that it is entirely possible that the practice of astral medicine is nothing more than a theoretical practice, devised by scholars of the time. Since several of the parts would have been expensive or otherwise impossible for the average Babylonian to obtain, this raises two possible situations. It is very possible that the whole concept of astral medicine in terms of the kalendartexte and other such sources were, as previously stated, simply theory and never intended for real use. However, Babylonian medicine contains a tradition known as Dreckapotheke, wherein the names of common ingredients are given names of often unpleasant sounding ones. It is also within the realm of possibility that the ingredients listed in the kalendartexte are following this tradition.

Animal ingredients for each sign in Iqīšâ's kalendartexte
Zodiacal Sign	Normal Babylonian Name	Ingredient
Aries	The Hired Man	Sheep
Taurus	The Stars (Pleiades)	Bull
Gemini	The Twin	Rooster
Cancer	The Crab	Crab
Leo	The Lion	Lion
Virgo	The Barleystalk	Barley-flour, Raven
Libra	The Balance	"empty"
Scorpio	The Scorpion	"empty"
Sagittarius	Pabilsag	Anzu-bird
Capricorn	The Goat-fish	Goat
Aquarius	The Great One	Eagle
Pisces	The Tails	Dove, Swallow

=== Astrology and the calendar ===
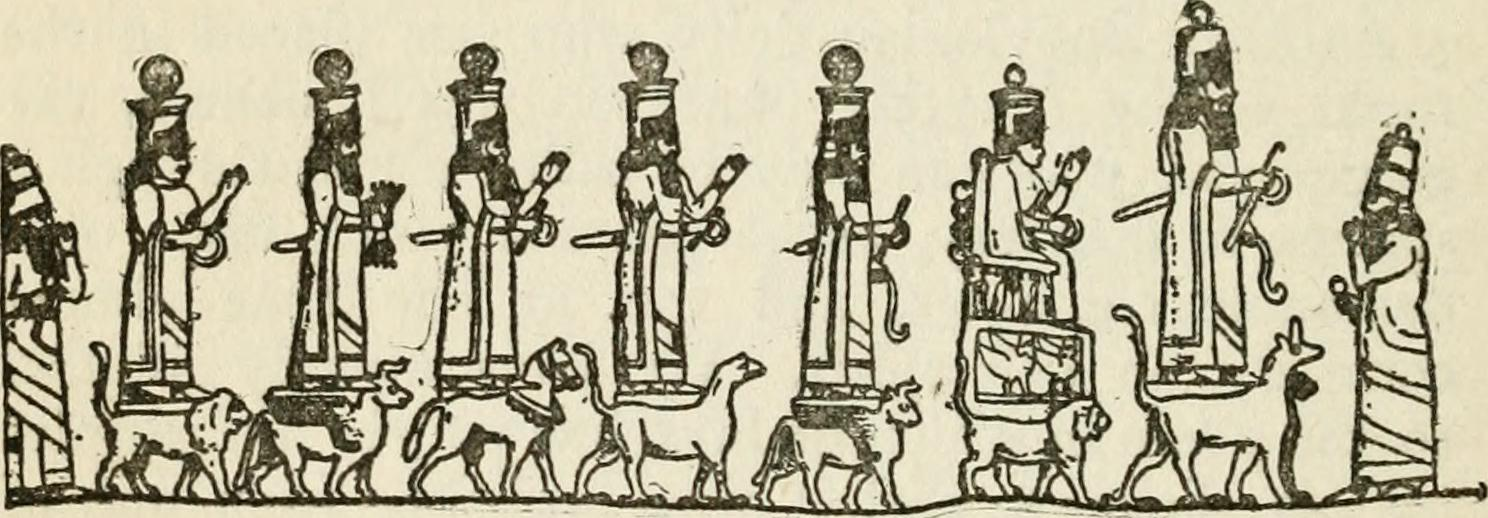
(From right to left) Ashur, Ishtar, Sin, Enlil, Shamash, Adad, and Ishtar of Arbela are flanked by two star-worshippers.

The calendar and astrology were very interconnected. When creating the calendar for the next month or year, it was important to keep in mind where important festivals and other religious activities would fall. It seems that four nearby, surrounding countries contributed to each twelve-month calendar year: Elam, Amurru, Subartu, and Akkad. The months were divided into groups of three, alternating by four, evenly split among the four lands. The first, fifth, and ninth months belonged to Akkad, the second, sixth, and tenth belonged to Elam, the third, seventh, and eleventh belonged to Amurru, and the fourth, eighth, and twelfth belonged to Subartu. Days of each month follows the same pattern, beginning with one for Akkad, two for Elam, three for Amurru, four for Subartu, five for Akkad, and so on. As calendars were often created by priests, months that would come with rather unfavorable events were limited, especially prioritizing against eclipses and new moons; this practice also carried over into scheduling the days of each month. The Moon was rather important to Mesopotamian peoples, and often it was what they based their calendar on. Lunar omens were among the most commonplace and, most often, they were based on eclipses rather than simple visibility. Deities of Mesopotamia were associated with certain times, days, and months.

In more mythological belief, at the end of each day, the sun god, Shamash, retired to "the lap of heaven" to rest.

== Limits of early knowledge ==
Astrology in its earliest stage was marked by limitations:

=== General nature ===
The first limitation was that the movements and position of the heavenly bodies point to such occurrences as are of public import and affect the general welfare. The individual's interests are not in any way involved, and we must descend many centuries and pass beyond the confines of Babylonia and Assyria before we reach that phase which in medieval and modern astrology is almost exclusively dwelt upon—the individual horoscope.

In Babylonia and Assyria the cult centred largely and indeed almost exclusively in the public welfare and the person of the king, because upon his well-being and favour with the gods the fortunes of the country were dependent, in accordance with the ancient conception of kingship.

=== Astronomical expertise ===
The second limitation was that the astronomical knowledge presupposed and accompanying early Babylonian astrology was, though essentially of an empirical character, limited and flawed. The theory of the ecliptic as representing the course of the Sun through the year, divided among twelve constellations with a measurement of 30° to each division, is of Babylonian origin, as has now been definitely proved; but it does not appear to have been perfected until after the fall of the Babylonian empire in 539 BC.

Similarly, the other accomplishments of Babylonian astronomers, such as their system or rather systems of moon calculations and the drawing up of planetary tablets, belong to this late period, so that the golden age of Babylonian astronomy belongs not to the remote past, as was until recently supposed, but to the Seleucid period; i.e. after the advent of the Greeks in the Euphrates Valley.

From certain expressions used in astrological texts that are earlier than the 7th century BC it would appear, indeed, that the beginnings at least of the calculation of Sun and Moon eclipses belong to the earlier period, but here, too, the chief work accomplished was after 400 BC, and the defectiveness of early Babylonian astronomy may be gathered from the fact that as late as the 6th century BC an error of almost an entire month was made by the Babylonian astronomers in the attempt to determine through calculation the beginning of a certain year.

In a general way, the reign of law and order in the movements of the heavenly bodies was recognized, and indeed must have exercised an influence at an early period in leading to the rise of a methodical divination that was certainly of a much higher order than the examination of an animal's liver.

However, the importance that was laid upon the endless variations in the form of the phenomena and the equally numerous apparent deviations from what were regarded as normal conditions, prevented for a long time the rise of any serious study of astronomy beyond what was needed for the purely practical purposes that the priests as "inspectors" of the heavens (as they were also the "inspectors" of the sacrificial livers) had in mind.

== Ashurbanipal ==
Ashurbanipal was a king of Assyria who ruled in the seventh century BC from 668 to 625 BC. He was famous for assembling a great library of cuneiform tablets in Nineveh on the subjects of astrology, history, mythology, and science. Some of Assurbanipal's astrologers, such as Rammanu-sumausar and Nabu-musisi, became so adept at deducing omens from daily movements of the planets that a system of making periodical reports to the king came into being. Thus, Ashurbanipal received swift messengers detailing "all occurrences in heaven and earth" throughout his kingdom and the results of his astrologer's examinations of them. He then used this information as a political weapon, and for the practical day-to-day running of his kingdom. After his death Nineveh fell to the Medes and the Chaldean Babylonians, and Assurbanipal's library was destroyed or dispersed.

== See also ==
- Astrology in medieval Islam
- Astronomy in the medieval Islamic world
- Babylonian astronomy
- Egyptian astrology
- Enuma Anu Enlil
- Hebrew astronomy
- Hellenistic astrology
- Jewish views on astrology
- Mandaean cosmology § Planets
- MUL.APIN
- Worship of heavenly bodies

== Sources ==
- Baigent, Michael, 1994. From the Omens of Babylon: Astrology and Ancient Mesopotamia. Arkana. ISBN 0-14-019480-0.
- Holden, James Herschel, 1996. A History of Horoscopic Astrology. AFA. ISBN 978-0-86690-463-6.
- Koch-Westenholz, Ulla, 1995. Mesopotamian astrology. Volume 19 of CNI publications. Museum Tusculanum Press. ISBN 978-87-7289-287-0.
- Neugebauer, Otto, 1969 (1st edition: 1957). The Exact Sciences in Antiquity (2nd ed.) Dover Publications. ISBN 978-0-486-22332-2.
- Rochberg, Francesa, 1998. Babylonian Horoscopes. American Philosophical Society. ISBN 0-87169-881-1.
- Verderame, Lorenzo, "The Primeval Zodiac: Its Social, Religious, and Mythological Background", in J.A. Rubiño-Martín et al., Cosmology Across Cultures, ASP Conference Series 409, San Francisco, 2009, 151–156.
