= MUL.APIN =

Babylonian astronomy and astrology

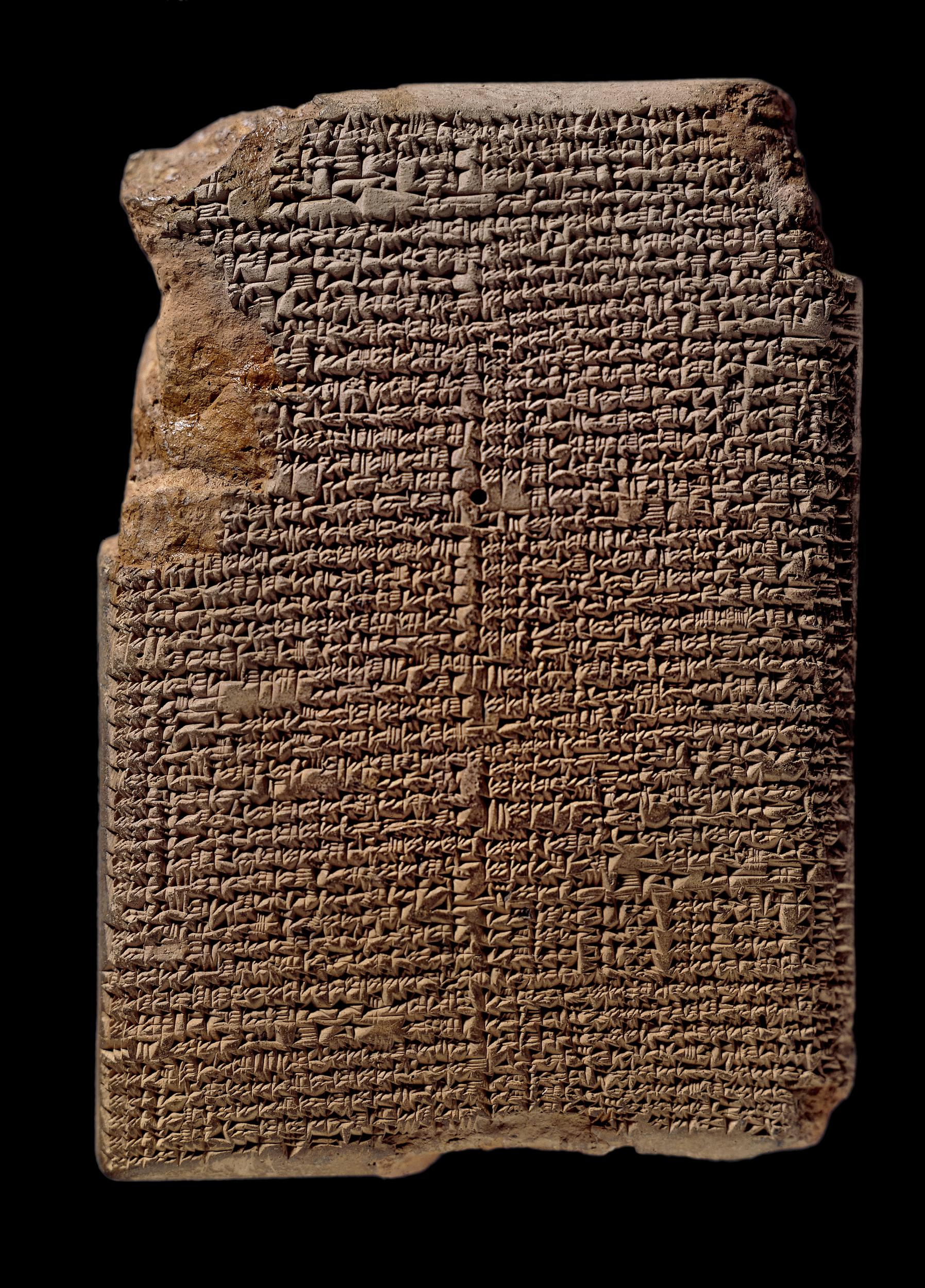
One of the two clay tablets on which the text is written. This exemplar shows that the tablet is unusually huge (as large as a sheet of paper) and the text is written in two columns.

MUL.APIN (𒀯𒀳) is the conventional title given to a Babylonian compendium that deals with many diverse aspects of Babylonian astronomy and astrology. It is in the tradition of earlier star catalogues, the so-called Three Stars Each lists, but represents an expanded version based on more accurate observation, likely compiled around 1000 BCE. The text lists the names of 66 stars and constellations and further gives a number of indications, such as rising, setting and culmination dates, that help to map out the basic structure of the Babylonian star map.

The text is preserved in a 7th-century BCE copy on a pair of tablets, named for their incipit, corresponding to the first constellation of the year, ^{MUL}APIN "The Plough", identified with stars in the area of the modern constellations of Cassiopeia, Andromeda and Triangulum according to the compilation of suggestions by Gössmann and Kurtik. Recently, it has been suggested to identify with Cassiopeia only.

== Date ==
The earliest copy of the text so far discovered was made in 686 BCE, but the majority of scholars now believe that the text was originally compiled around 1000 BCE. The latest copies of MUL.APIN are currently dated to around 300 BCE.

Earlier scholars such as Papke and Van der Waerden posited a date around 2300 BCE, which has been criticised by Hunger & Pingree who opt for a date around 1000 BCE.

The astrophysicist Bradley Schaefer and the astronomer Teije de Jong computed that the dates of the heliacal risings and settings in these tablets fit in the region of Assur at around the year 1370±100 BCE (Schaefer) or roughly the epoch between 1400 and 1100 BCE (de Jong).

Watson and Horowitz have shown that the text style changes from low to high complexity from one list to the other. Therefore, it is well possible that List 1 is older than List 2-4 and List 5.

== Parts ==
The text runs to two tablets and possibly a third auxiliary tablet, and is organised as follows:

Tablet I – Description of the static sky
List 1	I i 1	to	I ii 35	catalog of asterisms (inventory of the sky)
List 2	I ii 36	to	I iii 12	dates of heliacal rises in the Babylonian calendar
List 3	I iii 13	to	I iii 33	simultaneous rises and settings
List 4	I iii 34	to	I iii 48	time intervals between heliacal risings
List 5	I iv I	to	I iv 30	ziqpu-asterisms
List 6	I iv 31	to	I iv 39	asterisms in the path of the Moon

Tablet II – Changes in the sky
List 1	II i 1	to	II i 8	motion of planets in the lunar path
List 2	II i 9	to	II i 24	determining cardinal points of the year
List 3	II i 25–37	and	II i 68–71	heliacal risings and wind direction
List 4	II i 38	to	II i 67	planets – visibilities
List 5	II ii 1	to	II ii 20	intercalary rules
List 6	II ii 21	to	II ii 42	shadow lengths of the sundial
List 7	II ii 43	to	II iii 15	water clock
List 8	II iii 16	to	II iv 12	omens

=== Tablet 1 ===
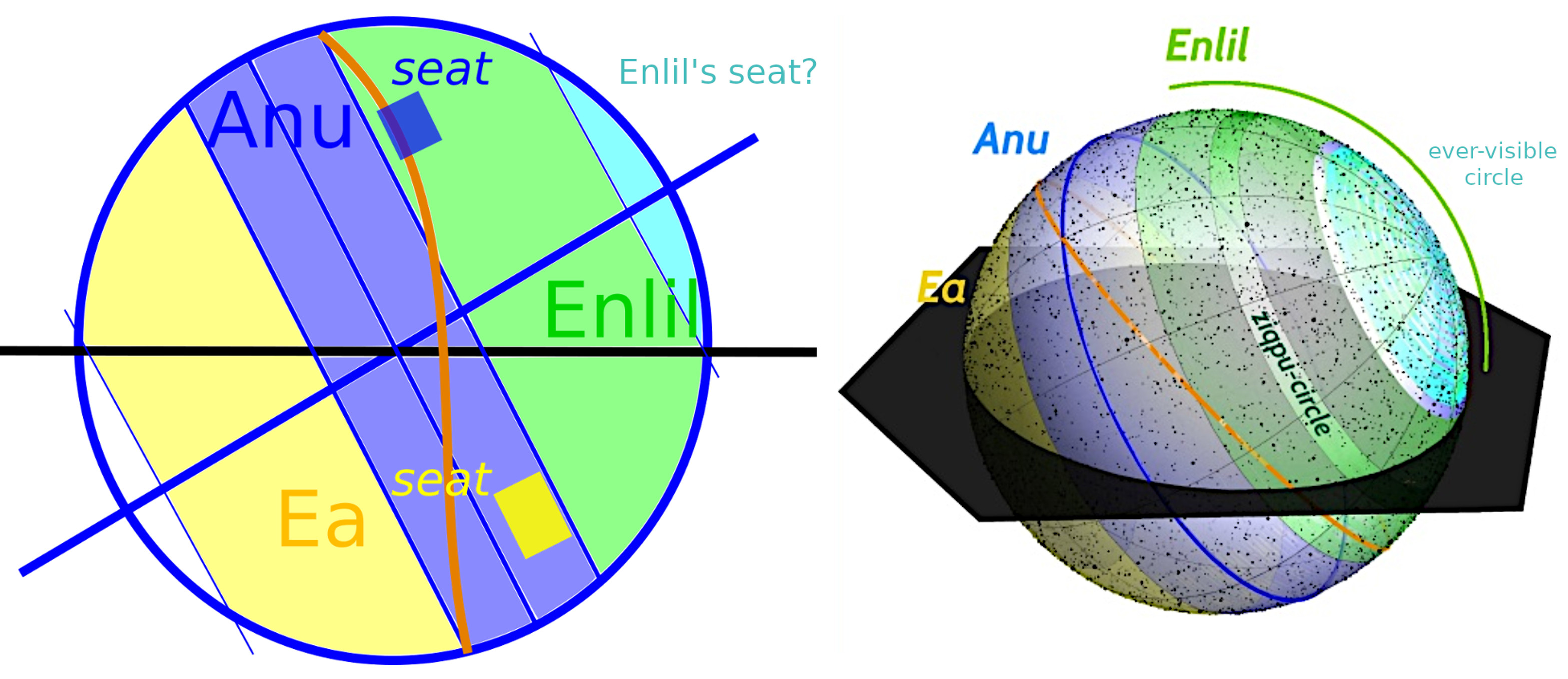
The Babylonian globe (no matter whether or not it existed physically) would have been divided in three paths of the gods Ea (south), Anu (±17° around the equator) and Enlil (northern cap, all declinations >17°). These three gods have their "seats" among the stars, represented by the constellations Cancer and Iku (Pegasus).

The first tablet is the most important resource for any potential reconstruction of the Babylonian star map as its various sections locate the constellations in relation to each other and to the calendar. Tablet 1 has six main sections:

- All the major stars and constellations are listed and organised into three broad divisions according to celestial latitude allocating each star to three paths:
  - the northern path of Enlil containing 33 stars or constellations
  - the presumably equatorial path of Anu containing 23 stars or constellations, and
  - the southern path of Ea containing 15 stars or constellations,
  Most of these stars and constellations are further attributed to a variety of Near Eastern deities.
  The path of Anu is considered as a belt around the celestial equator with a width of roughly ±17° that is divided in twelve equal parts of 30° length, representing ideal months.
- The heliacal rising dates of 34 stars and constellations are given according to the 360-day 'ideal' calendar year.
- Lists of stars and constellations that rise and set at the same time.
- The number of days between the risings of various stars and constellations.
- The stars and constellations that rise and culminate at the same time.
- The stars on the path of the moon, being the major constellations close to the ecliptic, which includes all the Babylonian forerunners to the zodiac constellations.

Even though the Babylonian calendar used a luni-solar calendar, which added an occasional thirteenth month to the calendar, MUL.APIN, like most texts of Babylonian astrology, uses an 'ideal' year composed of 12 'ideal' months each of which was composed of an 'ideal' 30 days. In this scheme the equinoxes were set on the 15th day of the first and seventh month, and the solstices on the 15th day of the fourth and tenth month.

=== Tablet 2 ===
The second tablet is of greater interest to historians of science as it furnishes us with many of the methods and procedures used by Babylonian astrologers to predict the movements of the sun, moon and planets as well as the various methods used to regulate the calendar. The contents of tablet 2 can be summarised under ten headings as follows:

- The names of the sun and the planets and the assertion that they all travel the same path as the moon.
- Which stars are rising and which contain the full moon on the solstices and equinoxes in order to judge the disparity of the lunar and solar cycles.
- Recommendations for observing the appearances of certain stars and the direction of the wind at the time of their first appearance.
- Very approximate values for the number of days that each planet is visible and invisible during the course of its observational cycle.
- The four stars associated with the four directional winds.
- The dates when the sun is present in each of the three stellar paths.
- Two types of intercalation scheme. One uses the rising dates of certain stars while the other uses position of the moon in relation to the stars and constellations.
- The relative duration of day and night at the solstices and equinoxes, and the lengths of shadow cast by a gnomon at various times of the day at the solstices and equinoxes.
- A basic mathematical scheme giving the rising and setting times of the moon in each month.
- A selection of astrological omens.

There is some evidence that a third, and so far unrecovered, tablet was sometimes appended to the series. To judge from its opening line it started with a section of scholarly explanations of celestial omens.

== Function of the text ==
MUL.APIN is considered the earliest known compendium of astronomical knowledge. The compiled lists and texts might have different origins in Mesopotamia.

Lists 2, 3, and 4 on Tablet 1 seem to originate from different traditions in making the calendar: List 2 starts with the rising of the constellation of the Arrow (stars around Sirius) while in List 4 all rising dates refer to the rising of ŠU.PA (stars in the vicinity of Arcturus). These two bright stars have both been used to determine the calendar. The two lists in MUL.APIN perfectly map onto each other although real observations have error bars of ~5 days. This suggests that the data had been made to fit or had been read from a globe (if it existed which has no archaeological proof but is an appropriate hypothesis and is highly likely after the 4th century BCE when it is proven in Greece). There is no evidence that a Babylonian globe really existed, however, the best visualisation of the Babylonian astronomy is the full-sky map or celestial globe.

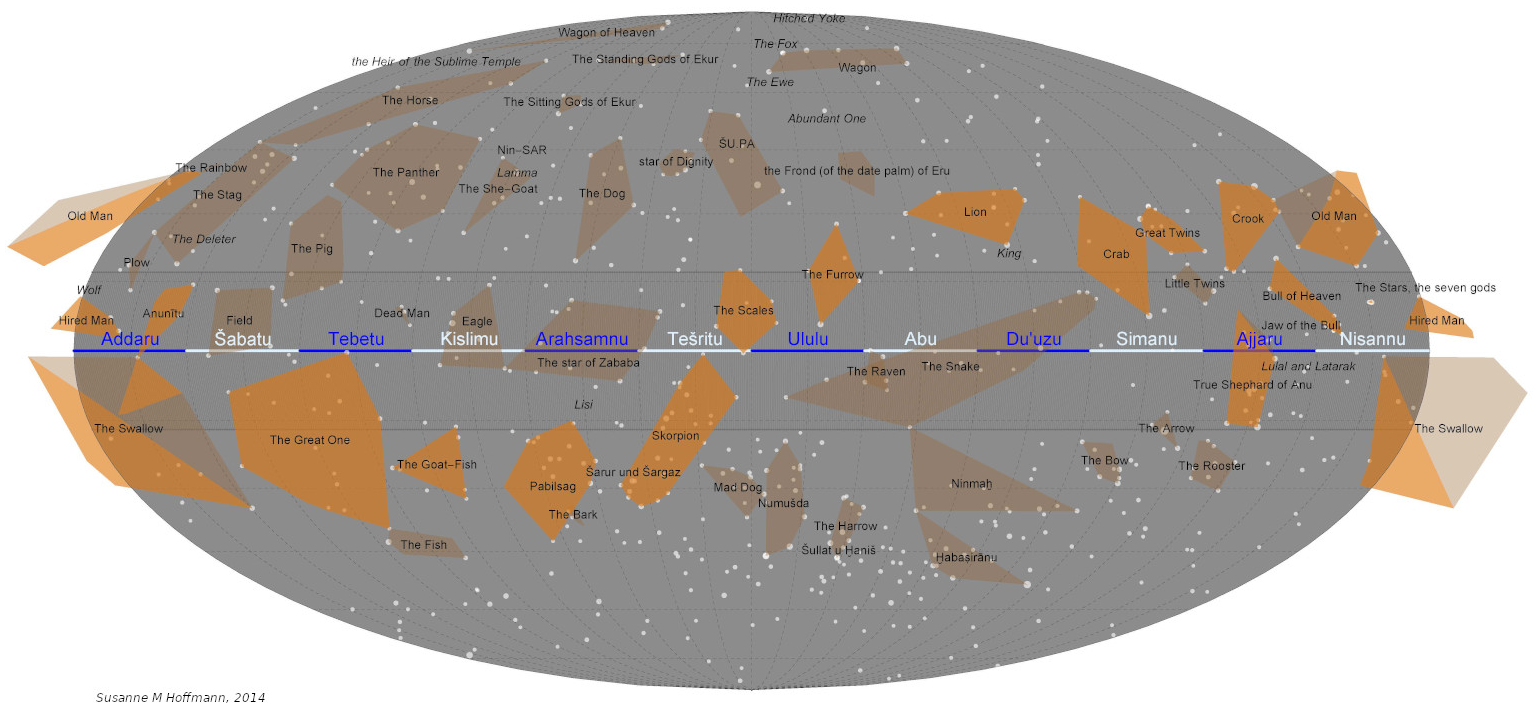
Map of the Babylonian Sky. Celestial equator divided in 12 equal parts (ideal months), constellations as polygons because only estimates of their position can be derived from the preserved data. Pingree's identification of constellations. Path of Anu marked in grey, path of the moon brighter than other constellations. Similar maps have been published in Hoffmann (2017).

The data in MUL.APIN represents no observable time units. The "days" and "months" in MUL.APIN are ideal days and months, i.e. fraction of the sidereal year that are obtained by dividing the lengths of a lunar months by 30 or the number of real days per year by 360 – depending on the context. The "year circle" on the celestial globe is the celestial equator. Dividing the celestial equator by 360, we obtain the degrees of right ascension (°RA) equaling the Babylonian unit 1 UŠ (one span) or one ideal day. a group of 30 ideal days of this type forms one ideal month. Thus, we can visualise the ideal months on the celestial map at the celestial equator.

According to these schemes, the dates of heliacal risings in settings in MUL.APIN are given as ideal dates: A statement like "ŠU.PA rises on the 15th of month Ululu (6th month)" would mean "rises at the (15+6*30) degree right ascension" (195°RA).

=== Uranography ===
On the first tablet, texts and data are – at least for us – sufficient to reconstruct the Babylonian celestial globe: List 6 reports the path of the moon that later became the zodiac. With lists 2 to 5, there are constellations given at certain °RA, e.g. for a particular ideal day constellation1 is rising (heliacally: List 2), constellation2 is setting simultaneously (List 3), constellation3 is at a given degree below the east horizon (rising as next one: List 4) and constellation4 is ziqpu (culminating: List5).

=== Calendar and star clock ===
On the second tablet, texts and data for the determination of the calendar are compiled.

Since the celestial equator can be divided into 12 or 24 hour lines which (like all the stars) move from east to west across the sky, one can use the view to the south to count these hour lines. The line from the north point across the zenith to the southern point on the horizon is called the meridian; there the celestial bodies reach their highest point (culmination). So all you have to do is setting up a vertical pole marking the southern direction and observe the star there. Every hour, another celestial body will be in the meridian and will thus culminate.

The Akkadian term "ziqpu" in the fifth list of the first tablet generally means "culmination". This list on the first tablet of MUL.APIN, therefore, lists constellations that have been used in order to determine the hours during the night. In later epochs of Babylonian astronomy, the observers took bright stars instead of constellations (areas) but originally, the accuracy in time measurement apparently was only sufficient to synchronize water clocks with constellations passing through the meridian. Later texts (such as the GU text, the shit-qu-lu text, and the astronomical diaries) witness the operation with more precise points. The ziqpu asterisms (stars and constellations) are, therefore, prerunners of the later "hour stars" listed in Hipparchus' commentary (2nd century BCE).

The 2nd and 3rd list of the 2nd tablet of MUL.APIN deal with the Sun and its motion in the course of a year.

In the Mesopotamian lunar calendar full moon is always on the 15th of the month. At full moon the Moon stands opposite the Sun. Therefore, an astronomer can deduce the Sun's (unobservable) position among the constellations from the (observable) position of the Moon among the constellations. The pre-condition is having built a celestial globe or another map of the sky which would be possible with the information on MUL.APIN's tablet I. In list 2 of the 2nd tablet (lines II i 9-21), MUL.APIN contains the first calendar rule: It is written how to use Sirius and the observations of the moon in the 4th, 7th, 10th and 1st month to determine the cardinal points of the year (i.e. equinoxes and solstices). For this purpose, every three months, observations are undertaken in the morning twilight.

In the following text, it is explained that the true position of the Moon can deviate from its ideal position. This statement introduces the necessity of intercalation.

There are six intercalation rules reported but it is uncertain how old they are. They are not preserved on all tablets of MUL.APIN but in the lines of "Gap A" on the second tablet. Three of the rules deal with the Moon; two are observational, one is computational, the other ones are based on observations of two bright stars and one star cluster in twilight:

intercalary rules in MUL.APIN
intercalation with heliacal risings
II Gap A 10	to	II Gap A 11	heliacal rise of the Pleiades
II Gap A 12	to	II Gap A 16	heliacal rise of Sirius
II Gap A 17	to	II Gap A 18	heliacal rise of Arcturus
intercalation with the Moon
II ii 1	to	II ii 2	plejadenschaltregel (i.e. Pleiades and the Moon)
II ii 3	to	II ii 4	intercalary rule for Sirius (i.e. Sirius and the Moon)
II ii 9	to	II ii 17	algorithm to compute correction and deduction of the rule to intercalate all three years

== Accuracy of the numbers ==
The uncertainty of observations of a heliacal phenomenon is 3 to 5 days because:

- the rising itself is a process that needs at least two observations: "not seen" on one day and "seen" on the subsequent day
- in case of cloudy weather the "seen" can be shifted by a couple of days
- the contrast of the celestial background in twilight might change due to climate and weather conditions and the visibility of the contrast (star versus background) depends on the astronomer's personal vision. Groups of up to 14 observers had been working in Babylon but still the visibility depends on their personal skills and weather conditions.

In MUL.APIN, almost all cases of heliacal phenomena refer to constellations and not to single stars. Possibly, the brightest star of a group was observed pars pro toto but if the brightest star is closest to the horizon and another one is much higher up in darker sky, the fainter one could be visible first. A constellation (area) always has a first and a last star rising (daily motion) and, thus, could be defined by two stars. Both stars would have an uncertainty in their observation of 3 to 5 days, which means that the constellations is determined only with an uncertainty of 6 to 10 days.

Indeed, the data in MUL.APIN is given in day numbers that are always multiples of 5 – probably implying that this was its uncertainty.

=== Reconstruction of coordinates ===
Taking only the constellation name and assume that the Babylonians certainly knew what they did and consider the definition (e.g. "visibility of the first star of the group"), we can estimate the position of constellations roughly. However, the uncertainty of the observation means that we can estimate the position constellation Iku rising at a given ideal day (which translates into point coordinates with computation) only within an error bar that extents to the diameter of its area.

== Path of the Moon – the Pre-Zodiac ==
These depictions have been created for various opportunities in planetariums. They are based on the standard knowledge in Assyriology and some studies, especially dedicated to the identification of these constellations.

No.	MUL.APIN name	Translation	Constellation (IAU)	Path/Zone	picture
1	MUL.MUL	Many Stars (or: Star Cluster)	Pleiades (Taurus)	Anu	
2	GU_{4}.AN.NA	Bull of Heaven	Taurus	Anu	
3	SIPA.AN.NA	True Shepherd of Anu	Orion	Anu	
4	ŠU.GI	Old Man (Enmešarra, the last of Enlil's primeval ancestors)	Perseus	Enlil	
5	GAM	Crook	Auriga	Enlil	
6	MAŠ.TAB.BA.GAL.GAL	Great Twins (Lugal-irra and Meslamta-ea, a pair of netherworld gods)	Gemini (north of ecliptic)	Enlil	
7	AL.LUL	Crab	Cancer	Enlil	
8	UR.GU.LA	Lion	Leo	Enlil	
9	AB.SIN	Furrow	Virgo (north of Spica)	Šala	
10	RIN	Balance	Libra and the part of Virgo south of Spica	Anu	
11	GIR.TAB	Scorpion	Scorpius (maybe plus southern parts of Ophiuchus)	Ea	
12	PA.BIL.SAG	Pabilsang (city god of Larak, who was identified with Ninurta, particularly in his role as the husband of the healing-goddess Gula)	Sagittarius	Ea	
13	SUḪUR.MEŠ	Goat-Fish	Capricornus	Ea	
14	GU.LA	The Great One (a common by-name of the god Ea/Enki)	Aquarius	Ea	
15	KUN^{MUŠ} (ša) SIM.MAḪ	Tails of the Great Swallow	Pisces	Anu/Ea	
16	^{Dingir}Anunitu	Goddess Anunitu	the eastern one of the two fishes in Pisces plus parts of Andromeda (β And)	Anu	
17	^{LU}HUN.GA	Hired Man (or: Loan Worker) (Dumuzi, the mythical lover of Inanna/Ištar who is imagined as a shepherd)	Aries and Triangulum	Anu	

== See also ==
- Babylonian star catalogues
- Enuma anu enlil
- Urra=hubullu
