= Enuma Anu Enlil =

Babylonian astrology tablets

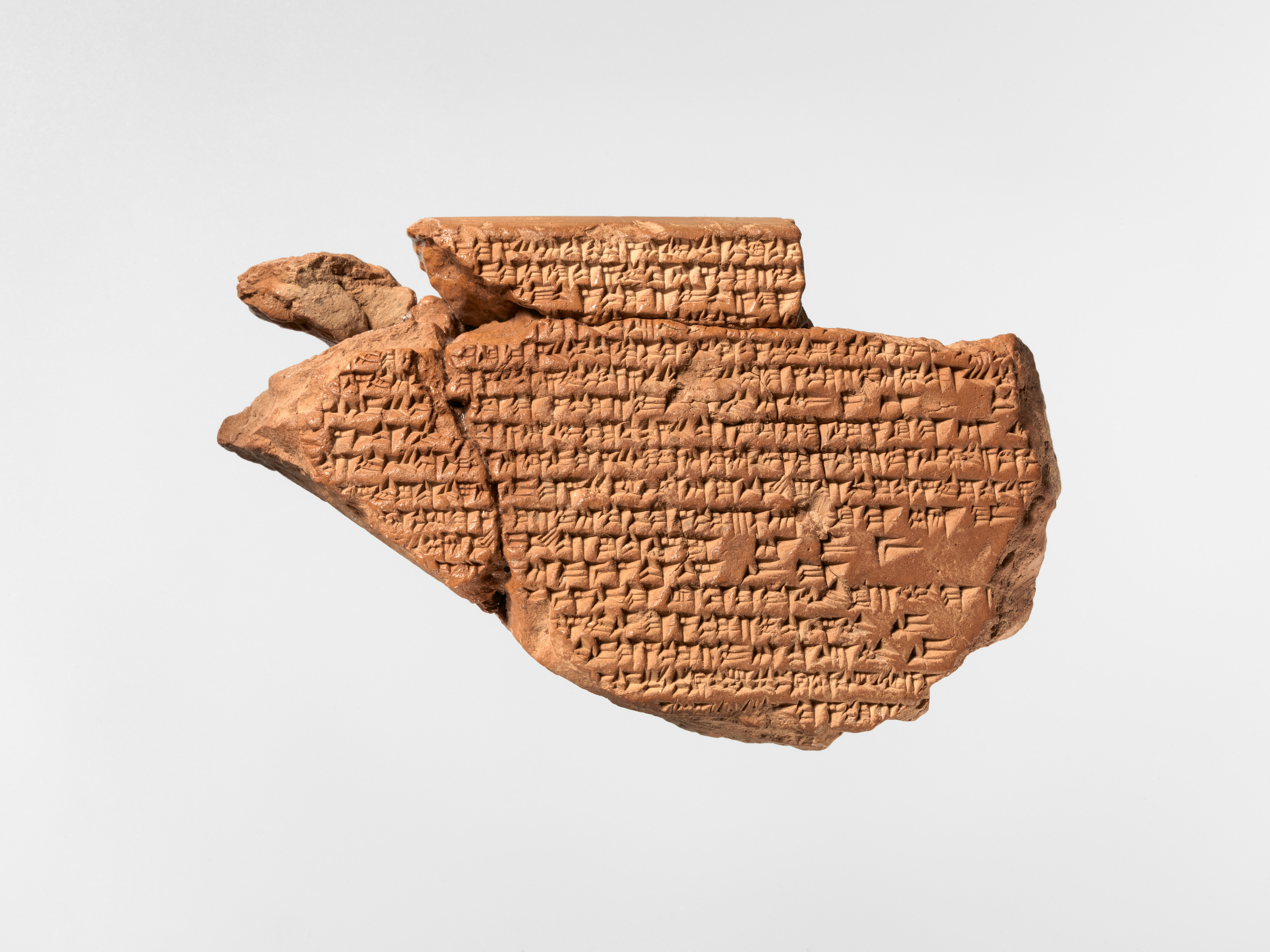
- A fragment from the Enuma Anu Enlil, dating to the ca. late 1st millennium BCE.

General Information
- Material: Clay
- Inscription type: Cuneiform

Discovery
- Place found: Uruk

Contents of the Inscription

Location and Status

Enuma Anu Enlil (𒌓𒀭𒈾𒀭𒂗𒆤𒇲 U_{4} AN.na ^{d}EN.LÍL.lá, lit. When [the gods] Anu and Enlil [...]), abbreviated EAE, is a major series of 68 or 70 tablets (depending on the recension) dealing with Babylonian astrology. The bulk of the work is a substantial collection of omens, estimated to number between 6500 and 7000, which interpret a wide variety of celestial and atmospheric phenomena in terms relevant to the king and state.

== Overview ==
Enuma Anu Enlil is the principal source of omens used in the regular astrological reports that were sent to the Neo-Assyrian king by his entourage of scholars. There are well over 500 of such reports published in volume 8 of the State Archives of Assyria. A majority of these reports simply list the relevant omens that best describe recent celestial events and many add brief explanatory comments concerning the interpretation of the omens for the benefit of the king.

A typical report dealing with the first appearance of the moon on the first day of the month is exemplified by Report 10 from volume 8 of the State Archives:

If the moon becomes visible on the first day: reliable speech; the land will be happy.
If the day reaches its normal length: a reign of long days.
If the moon at its appearance wears a crown: the king will reach the highest rank.
From Issar-šumu-ereš.

The series was probably compiled in its canonical form during the Kassite period (1595–1157 BCE) but there was certainly some form of prototype Enuma Anu Enlil current in the Old Babylonian period (1950–1595 BCE). It continued in use well into the 1st millennium, the latest datable copy being written in 194 BCE. It is believed that the first 49 tablets were transmitted to India in the 4th or 3rd centuries BCE and that the final tablets dealing with the stars had also arrived in India just before the start of the common era.

== Contents ==
The whole series has yet to be fully reconstructed and many gaps in the text are still evident. The matter is complicated by the fact that copies of the same tablet often differ in their contents or are organised differently—a fact that has led some scholars to believe that there were up to five different recensions of the text current in different parts of the Ancient Near East.

The subject matter of the Enuma Anu Enlil tablets unfold in a pattern that reveals the behaviour of the moon first, then solar phenomena, followed by other weather activities, and finally the behaviour of various stars and planets.

The first 13 tablets deal with the first appearances of the moon on various days of the month, its relation to planets and stars, and such phenomena as lunar haloes and crowns. The omens from this section, like those quoted above, are the most frequently used in the whole corpus. This section is framed by tablet 14, which details a basic mathematical scheme for predicting the visibility of the moon.

Tablets 15 to 22 are dedicated to lunar eclipses. It uses many forms of encoding, such as the date, watches of the night and quadrants of the moon, to predict which regions and cities the eclipse was believed to affect.

Tablets 23 to 29 deal with the appearances of the sun, its colour, markings and its relation to cloudbanks and storm clouds when it rises. Solar eclipses are explored in tablets 30 to 39.

Tablets 40 to 49 concern weather phenomena and earthquakes, special attention being devoted to the occurrence of thunder.

The final 20 tablets are dedicated to the stars and planets. These tablets in particular use a form of encoding in which the names of the planets are replaced by the names of fixed stars and constellations.

== Publication of the series ==
At the present time less than half of the series has been published in modern English editions. The lunar eclipse tablets (tablets 15–22) were transliterated and translated in Aspects of Babylonian Celestial Divination, by F. Rochberg-Halton, 1989. The solar omens (tablets 23–29) were published as The Solar Omens of Enuma Anu Enlil edited by W. Van Soldt, 1995. And several tablets concerning planetary omens were published by E. Reiner and H. Hunger under the title Babylonian Planetary Omens volumes 1–4. The first part of the lunar omens (tablets 1–6) has been published in Italian by L. Verderame, Le tavole I–VI della serie astrologica Enuma Anu Enlil, 2002. Tablets 44-49 were published by E. Gehlken in Weather Omens of Enūma Anu Enlil: Thunderstorms, Wind, and Rain (Tablets 44–49) (Leiden: Brill, 2012).

== See also ==
- Babylonian astrology
- Babylonian star catalogues
- MUL.APIN
