= Christine Proust =

French historian of mathematics and Assyriologist (born 1953)

Christine Proust (born 1953) is a French historian of mathematics and Assyriologist known for her research on Babylonian mathematics. She is a senior researcher at the SPHERE joint team of CNRS and Paris Diderot University, where she and Agathe Keller (who studies mathematical Sanskrit texts) are co-directors of the SAW project (Mathematical Sciences in the Ancient World) headed by Karine Chemla (an expert in ancient Chinese mathematics).

== Education and career ==
Following a two-decade long career as a secondary mathematics teacher, including an agrégation in Mathematics in 1992, Proust studied epistemology and history of science at Paris Diderot University, earning a diplôme d'études approfondies in 1999 and a doctorate in 2004, supervised by Christian Houzel. She completed a habilitation at Paris Diderot in 2010, and became a director of research in the SPHERE laboratory in 2011.

Proust was a member of the Institute for Advanced Study in Princeton during 2009, a visiting scholar at the Institute for the Study of the Ancient World at New York University during 2010, and a resident at the Institut Méditerranéen de Recherches Avancées in Marseille during 2010–2011.

== Scholarship ==
In her thesis work, Proust edited and analyzed two long-neglected collections of Old Babylonian mathematical tablets that constitute part of the vast trove of artifacts excavated at Nippur by John Punnett Peters, John Henry Haynes and Hermann Hilprecht in the late 1800s. This work resulted in the publication of two books, 'Tablettes mathématiques de Nippur' and 'Tablettes mathématiques de la collection Hilprecht'. The first is an edition of the tablets housed at the Museum of the Ancient Orient in Istanbul and an improved reconstruction of the curriculum for elementary scribal education in mathematics at Old Babylonian Nippur, the second is an edition of the tablets housed in the Hilprecht Collection at the University of Jena. (Other Nippur tablets at the University of Pennsylvania and had been previously studied by Eleanor Robson.)

Proust's work produced the most detailed reconstruction of the process of elementary scribal education at Old Babylonian Nippur, including the curriculum and timelines, the interaction of education in Sumerian language and mathematics (Sumerian was a foreign language to the Akkadian speakers of the Old Babylonian era), and the interaction between metrological calculation and abstract calculation using sexagesimal place-value notation.

With Alexander Jones she curated the exhibit Before Pythagoras: The Culture of Old Babylonian Mathematics (2010–2011) at the Institute for the Study of the Ancient World (ISAW) in New York in which a number of mathematically important clay tablets, including YBC 7289 and Plimpton 322 were on display. Proust has also been involved in study of the papers and correspondence of the noted historian Otto Neugebauer, who largely initiated the study of mathematical cuneiform texts in the mid-twentieth century. Some of this material was on display at the ISAW exhibit

== Books ==
Proust is the author of Tablettes mathématiques de Nippur (De Boccard, 2007) and of Tablettes mathématiques de la collection Hilprecht (Harrassowitz, 2008).

She is the editor of books including:

- Scientific Sources and Teaching Contexts Throughout History: Problems and Perspectives (with Alain Bernard, Springer, 2014)
- A Mathematician's Journeys: Otto Neugebauer and Modern Transformations of Ancient Science (with Alexander Jones and John Steele, Springer, 2016)
- Scholars and Scholarship in Late Babylonian Uruk (with John Steele, Springer, 2019)

== Recognition ==
Proust was the 2011 winner of the Prix Paul Doistau-Émile Blutet de l'information scientifique, given by the French Academy of Sciences in recognition of the body of her work and, in particular, for her publication of the Nippur tablets. She became a corresponding member of the International Academy of the History of Science in 2019. She received one of the two Kenneth O. May Prize medals awarded by the International Commission on the History of Mathematics on 26 July 2021 at the International Congress for History and Philosophy of Science in Prague.
