= IM 67118 =

Babylonian clay tablet on mathematics

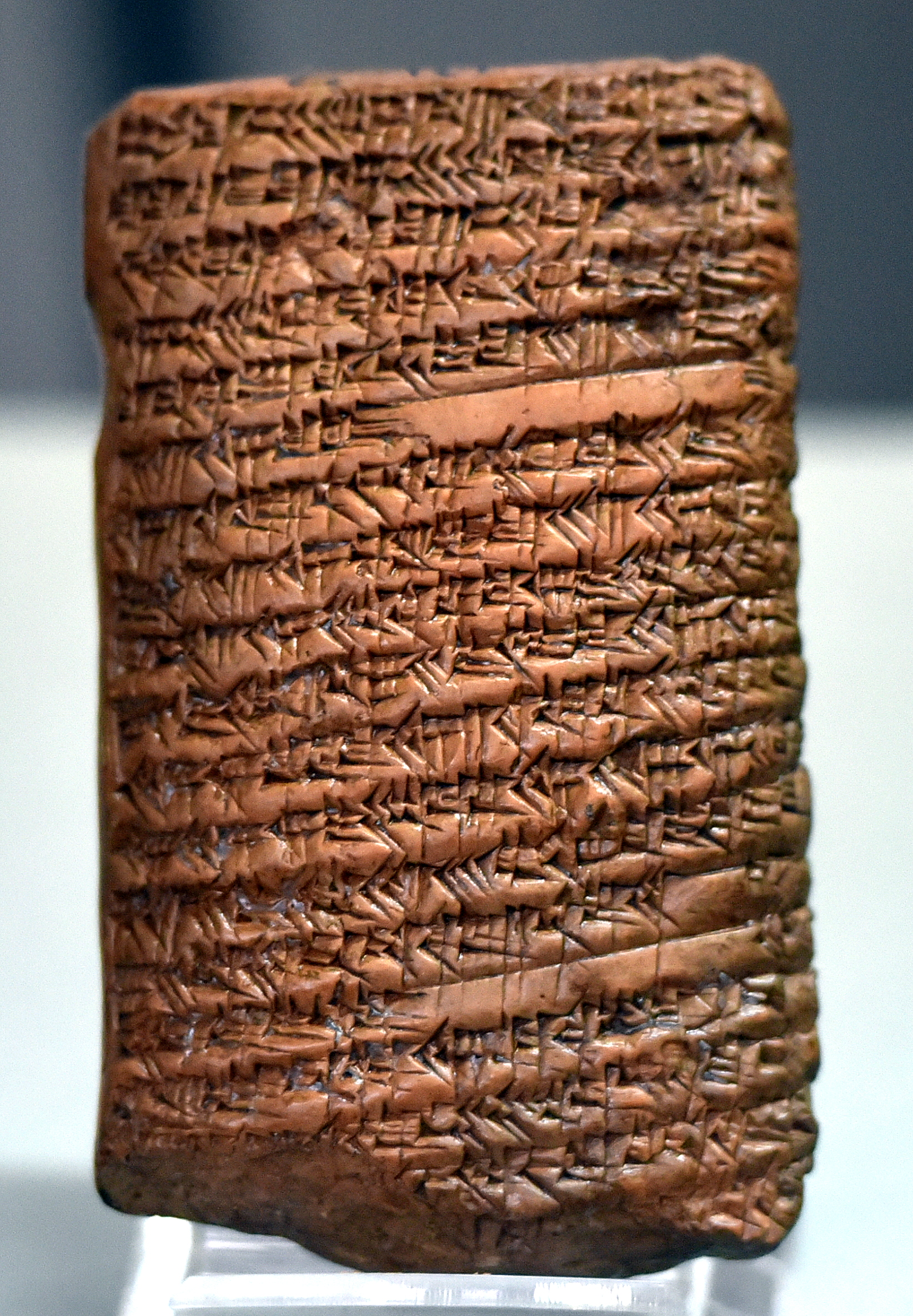
- Clay tablet, IM 67118, mathematical, geometric-algebraic, similar to the Pythagorean theorem. From Tell al-Dhabba'i, Iraq. 2003-1595 BCE. Iraq Museum
- Height: 11.5 cm
- Width: 6.8 cm
- Created: c. 1770 BC
- Discovered: 1962; Baghdad, Baghdad Governorate, Iraq
- Present location: Baghdad, Baghdad Governorate, Iraq
- Language: Akkadian

IM 67118, also known as Db_{2}-146, is an Old Babylonian clay tablet in the collection of the Iraq Museum that contains the solution to a problem in plane geometry concerning a rectangle with given area and diagonal. In the last part of the text, the solution is proved correct using the Pythagorean theorem. The steps of the solution are believed to represent cut-and-paste geometry operations involving a diagram from which, it has been suggested, ancient Mesopotamians might, at an earlier time, have derived the Pythagorean theorem.

== Description ==
The tablet was excavated in 1962 at Tell edh-Dhiba'i, an Old Babylonian settlement near modern Baghdad that was once part of the kingdom of Eshnunna, and was published by Taha Baqir in the same year. It dates to approximately 1770 BCE (according to the middle chronology), during the reign of Ibal-pi-el II, who ruled Eshnunna at the same time that Hammurabi ruled Babylon. The tablet measures 11.5 cm × 6.8 cm × 3.3 cm (4 1/2 in × 2 3/4 in × 1 1/4 in). Its language is Akkadian, written in cuneiform script. There are 19 lines of text on the tablet's obverse and six on its reverse. The reverse also contains a diagram consisting of the rectangle of the problem and one of its diagonals. Along that diagonal is written its length in sexagesimal notation; the area of the rectangle is written in the triangular region below the diagonal.

== Problem and its solution ==
In modern mathematical language, the problem posed on the tablet is the following: a rectangle has area A = 0.75 and diagonal c = 1.25. What are the lengths a and b of the sides of the rectangle?

The solution can be understood as proceeding in two stages: in stage 1, the quantity $\sqrt{c^2-2A}$ is computed to be 0.25. In stage 2, the well-attested Old Babylonian method of completing the square is used to solve what is effectively the system of equations b − a = 0.25, ab = 0.75. Geometrically this is the problem of computing the lengths of the sides of a rectangle whose area A and side-length difference b−a are known, which was a recurring problem in Old Babylonian mathematics. In this case it is found that b = 1 and a = 0.75. The solution method suggests that whoever devised the solution was using the property c^{2} − 2A = c^{2} − 2ab = (b − a)^{2}. It must be emphasized, however, that the modern notation for equations and the practice of representing parameters and unknowns by letters were unheard of in ancient times. It is now widely accepted as a result of Jens Høyrup's extensive analysis of the vocabulary of Old Babylonian mathematics, that underlying the procedures in texts such as IM 67118 was a set of standard cut-and-paste geometric operations, not a symbolic algebra.

Possible geometric basis for a solution of IM 67118. Solid lines of the figure show stage 1; dashed lines and shading show stage 2. The central square has side b − a. The light gray region is the gnomon of area A = ab. The dark gray square (of side (b − a)/2) completes the gnomon to a square of side (b + a)/2. Adding (b − a)/2 to the horizontal dimension of the completed square and subtracting it from the vertical dimension produces the desired rectangle.

From the vocabulary of the solution Høyrup concludes that c^{2}, the square of the diagonal, is to be understood as a geometric square, from which an area equal to 2A is to be "cut off", that is, removed, leaving a square with side b − a. Høyrup suggests that the square on the diagonal was possibly formed by making four copies of the rectangle, each rotated by 90°, and that the area 2A was the area of the four right triangles contained in the square on the diagonal. The remainder is the small square in the center of the figure.

The geometric procedure for computing the lengths of the sides of a rectangle of given area A and side-length difference b − a was to transform the rectangle into a gnomon of area A by cutting off a rectangular piece of dimensions a×½(b − a) and pasting this piece onto the side of the rectangle. The gnomon was then completed to a square by adding a smaller square of side ½(b − a) to it. In this problem, the side of the completed square is computed to be $\sqrt{A+\tfrac{1}{4}(b-a)^2}=\sqrt{0.75+0.015625}=0.875$. The quantity ½(b − a)=0.125 is then added to the horizontal side of the square and subtracted from the vertical side. The resulting line segments are the sides of the desired rectangle.

One difficulty in reconstructing Old Babylonian geometric diagrams is that known tablets never include diagrams in solutions—even in geometric solutions where explicit constructions are described in text—although diagrams are often included in formulations of problems. Høyrup argues that the cut-and-paste geometry would have been performed in some medium other than clay, perhaps in sand or on a "dust abacus", at least in the early stages of a scribe's training before mental facility with geometric calculation had been developed.

Friberg does describe some tablets containing drawings of "figures within figures", including MS 2192, in which the band separating two concentric equilateral triangles is divided into three trapezoids. He writes, "The idea of computing the area of a triangular band as the area of a chain of trapezoids is a variation on the idea of computing the area of a square band as the area of a chain of four rectangles. This is a simple idea, and it is likely that it was known by Old Babylonian mathematicians, although no cuneiform mathematical text has yet been found where this idea enters in an explicit way." He argues that this idea is implicit in the text of IM 67118. He also invites a comparison with the diagram of YBC 7329, in which two concentric squares are shown. The band separating the squares is not subdivided into four rectangles on this tablet, but the numerical value of the area of one of the rectangles area does appear next to the figure.

== Checking the solution ==
The solution b = 1, a = 0.75 is proved correct by computing the areas of squares with the corresponding side-lengths, adding these areas, and computing the side-length of the square with the resulting area, that is, by taking the square root. This is an application of the Pythagorean theorem, $c=\sqrt{a^2+b^2}$, and the result agrees with the given value, c = 1.25. That the area is also correct is verified by computing the product, ab.

== Translation ==
The following translation is given by Britton, Proust, and Shnider and is based on the translation of Høyrup, which in turn is based on the hand copy and transliteration of Baqir, with some small corrections. Babylonian sexagesimal numbers are translated into decimal notation with base-60 digits separated by commas. Hence 1,15 means 1 + 15/60 = 5/4 = 1.25. Note that there was no "sexagesimal point" in the Babylonian system, so the overall power of 60 multiplying a number had to be inferred from context. The translation is "conformal", which, as described by Eleanor Robson, "involves consistently translating Babylonian technical terms with existing English words or neologisms which match the original meanings as closely as possible"; it also preserves Akkadian word order. Old Babylonian mathematics used different words for multiplication depending on the underlying geometric context and similarly for the other arithmetic operations.

Obverse

1. If, about a (rectangle with) diagonal, (somebody) asks you
2. thus, 1,15 the diagonal, 45 the surface;
3. length and width corresponding to what? You, by your proceeding,
4. 1,15, your diagonal, its counterpart lay down:
5. make them hold: 1,33,45 comes up,
6. 1,33,45 may (?) your (?) hand hold (?)
7. 45 your surface to two bring: 1,30 comes up.
8. From 1,33,45 cut off: 3,45 the remainder.
9. The equalside of 3,45 take: 15 comes up. Its half-part,
10. 7,30 comes up, to 7,30 raise: 56,15 comes up
11. 56,15 your hand. 45 your surface over your hand,
12. 45,56,15 comes up. The equalside of 45,56,15 take:
13. 52,30 comes up, 52,30 its counterpart lay down,
14. 7,30 which you have made hold to one
15. append: from one
16. cut off. 1 your length, 45 the width. If 1 the length,
17. 45 the width, the surface and the diagonal corresponding to what?
18. (You by your) making, the length make hold:
19. (1 comes up ...) may your head hold.

Reverse

20. [...]: 45, the width, make hold:
21. 33,45 comes up. To your length append:
22. 1,33,45 comes up. The equalside of 1,33,45 take:
23. 1,15 comes up. 1,15 your diagonal. Your length
24. to the width raise, 45 your surface.
25. Thus the procedure.

The problem statement is given in lines 1–3, stage 1 of the solution in lines 3–9, stage 2 of the solution in lines 9–16, and verification of the solution in lines 16–24. Note that "1,15 your diagonal, its counterpart lay down: make them hold" means to form a square by laying down perpendicular copies of the diagonal, the "equalside" is the side of a square, or the square root of its area, "may your head hold" means to remember, and "your hand" may refer to "a pad or a device for computation".

== Relation to other texts ==
Problem 2 on the tablet MS 3971 in the Schøyen collection, published by Friberg, is identical to the problem on IM 67118. The solution is very similar but proceeds by adding 2A to c^{2}, rather than subtracting it. The side of the resulting square equals b + a = 1.75 in this case. The system of equations b + a = 1.75, ab = 0.75 is again solved by completing the square. MS 3971 contains no diagram and does not perform the verification step. Its language is "terse" and uses many Sumerian logograms in comparison with the "verbose" IM 67118, which is in syllabic Akkadian. Friberg believes this text comes from Uruk, in southern Iraq, and dates it before 1795 BCE.

Friberg points out a similar problem in a 3rd-century BCE Egyptian Demotic papyrus, P. Cairo, problems 34 and 35, published by Parker in 1972. Friberg also sees a possible connection to A.A. Vaiman's explanation of an entry in the Old Babylonian table of constants TMS 3, which reads, "57 36, constant of the šàr". Vaiman notes that the cuneiform sign for šàr resembles a chain of four right triangles arranged in a square, as in the proposed figure. The area of such a chain is 24/25 (equal to 57 36 in sexagesimal) if one assumes 3-4-5 right triangles with hypotenuse normalized to length 1. Høyrup writes that the problem of IM 67118 "turns up, solved in precisely the same way, in a Hebrew manual from 1116 ce".

== Significance ==
Although the problem on IM 67118 is concerned with a specific rectangle, whose sides and diagonal form a scaled version of the 3-4-5 right triangle, the language of the solution is general, usually specifying the functional role of each number as it is used. In the later part of the text, an abstract formulation is seen in places, making no reference to particular values ("the length make hold", "Your length to the width raise."). Høyrup sees in this "an unmistakeable trace of the 'Pythagorean rule' in abstract formulation".

The manner of discovery of the Pythagorean rule is unknown, but some scholars see a possible path in the method of solution used on IM 67118. The observation that subtracting 2A from c^{2} yields (b − a)^{2} need only be augmented by a geometric rearrangement of areas corresponding to a^{2}, b^{2}, and −2A = −2ab to obtain rearrangement proof of the rule, one which is well known in modern times and which is also suggested in the third century CE in Zhao Shuang's commentary on the ancient Chinese Zhoubi Suanjing (Gnomon of the Zhou). The formulation of the solution in MS 3971, problem 2, having no subtracted areas, provides a possibly even more straightforward derivation.

Høyrup proposes the hypothesis, based in part on similarities among word problems that reappear over a broad range of times and places and on the language and numerical content of such problems, that much of the scribal Old Babylonian mathematical material was imported from the practical surveyor tradition, where solving riddle problems was used as a badge of professional skill. Høyrup believes that this surveyor culture survived the demise of Old Babylonian scribal culture that resulted from the Hittite conquest of Mesopotamia in the early 16th century BCE and that it influenced the mathematics of ancient Greece, of Babylon during the Seleucid period, of the Islamic empire, and of medieval Europe. Among the problems Høyrup ascribes to this practical surveyor tradition are several rectangle problems requiring completing the square, including the problem of IM 67118. On the basis that no third-millennium BCE references to the Pythagorean rule are known, and that the formulation of IM 67118 is already adapted to the scribal culture, Høyrup writes, "To judge from this evidence alone it is therefore likely that the Pythagorean rule was discovered within the lay surveyors' environment, possibly as a spin-off from the problem treated in Db_{2}-146, somewhere between 2300 and 1825 BC." Thus the rule named after Pythagoras, who was born about 570 BCE and died c.495 BCE, is shown to have been discovered about 12 centuries before his birth.

== See also ==
- Plimpton 322
- YBC 7289
