= The History of Mathematical Tables =

2003 text

- Publisher: Oxford University Press
- ISBN: 978-0198508410

The History of Mathematical Tables: from Sumer to Spreadsheets is an edited volume in the history of mathematics on mathematical tables. It was edited by Martin Campbell-Kelly, Mary Croarken, Raymond Flood, and Eleanor Robson, developed out of the presentations at a conference on the subject organised in 2001 by the British Society for the History of Mathematics, and published in 2003 by the Oxford University Press.

== Topics ==
An introductory chapter classifies tables broadly according to whether they are intended as aids to calculation (based on mathematical formulas) or as analyses and records of data, and further subdivides them according to how they were compiled. Following this, the contributions to the book include articles on the following topics:

- Tables of data in Babylonian mathematics, administration, and astronomy, by Eleanor Robson
- Early tables of logarithms, by Graham Jagger
- Life tables in actuarial science, by Christopher Lewin and Margaret de Valois
- The work of Gaspard de Prony constructing mathematical tables in revolutionary France, by Ivor Grattan-Guinness
- Difference engines, by Michael Williams
- The uses and advantages of machines in table-making, and error correction in mechanical tables, by Doron Swade
- Astronomical tables, by Arthur Norberg
- The data processing and statistical analyses used to produce tables of census data from punched cards, by Edward Higgs
- British table-making committees, and the transition from calculators to computers, by Mary Croarken
- The Mathematical Tables Project of the Works Progress Administration, in New York during the Great Depression of the 1930s and early 1940s, by David Alan Grier
- The work of the British Nautical Almanac Office, by George A. Wilkins
- Spreadsheets, by Martin Campbell-Kelly.

The work is presented on VIII + 361 pages in a unified format with illustrations throughout, and with the historical and biographical context of the material set aside in separate text boxes.

== Audience and reception ==
Reviewer Paul J. Campbell finds it ironic that, unlike the works it discusses, "there are no tables in the back of the book". Reviewer Sandy L. Zabell calls the book "interesting and highly readable".

Both Peggy A. Kidwell and Fernando Q. Gouvêa note several topics that would have been worthwhile to include, including tables in mathematics in medieval Islam or other non-Western cultures, the book printing industry that provided inexpensive books of tables in the 19th century, and the development of mathematical tables in Germany. As Kidwell writes, "like most good books, this one not only tells good stories, but leaves the reader hoping to learn more". Gouvêa evaluates the book as being useful in its coverage of a topic often missed in broader surveys of the history of mathematics, of interest both to historians of mathematics and to a more general audience interested in the development of these topics, and "a must-have for libraries".
