= YBC 7289 =

Babylonian mathematical clay tablet

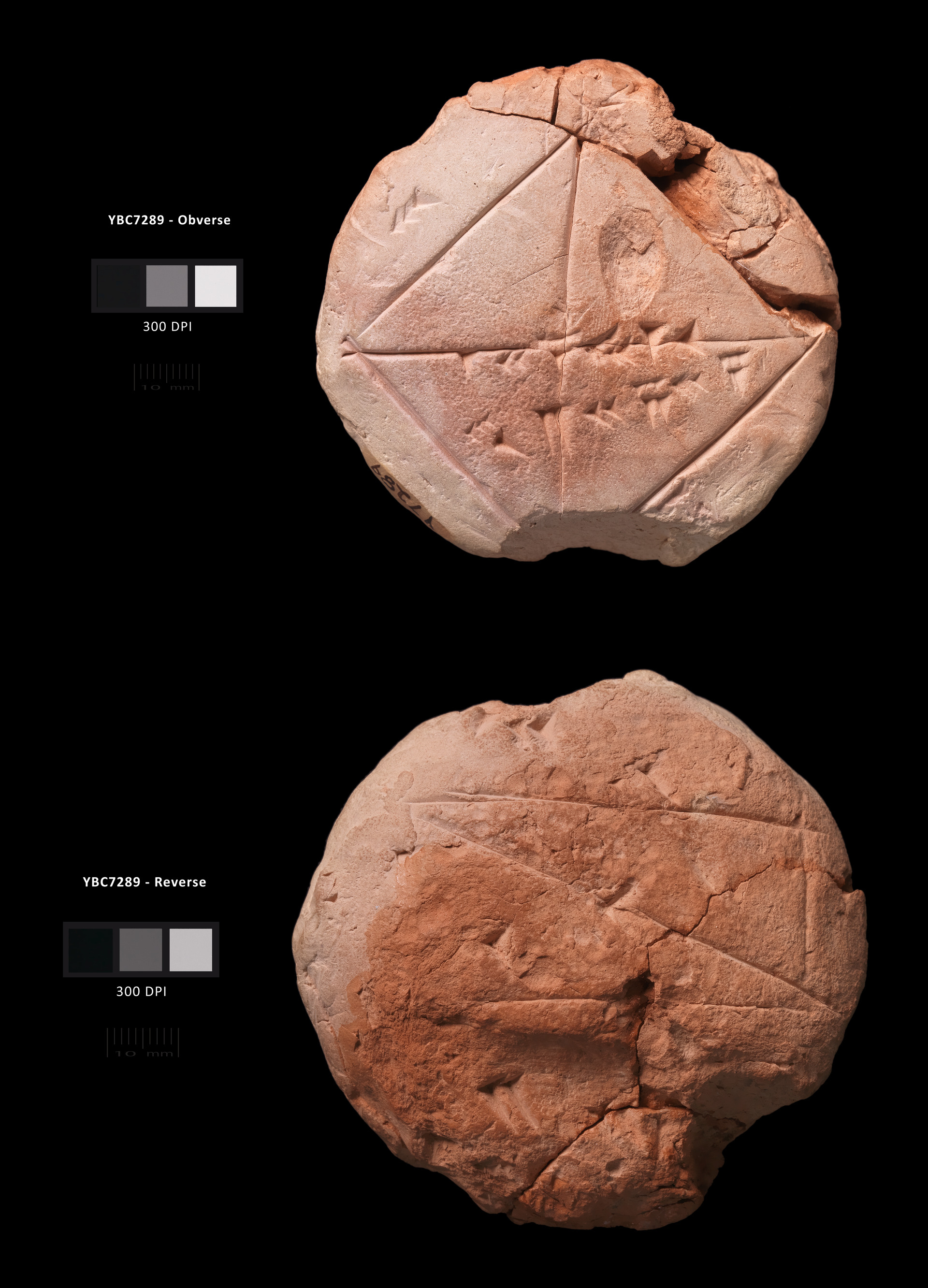
- Material: Clay
- Created: c. 1700 BC
- Present location: Yale University, Connecticut, United States

YBC 7289 is a Babylonian clay tablet notable for containing an accurate sexagesimal approximation to the square root of 2, the length of the diagonal of a unit square. This number is given to the equivalent of six decimal digits, "the greatest known computational accuracy ... in the ancient world". The tablet is believed to be the work of a student in southern Mesopotamia from some time between 1800 and 1600 BC.

== Content ==
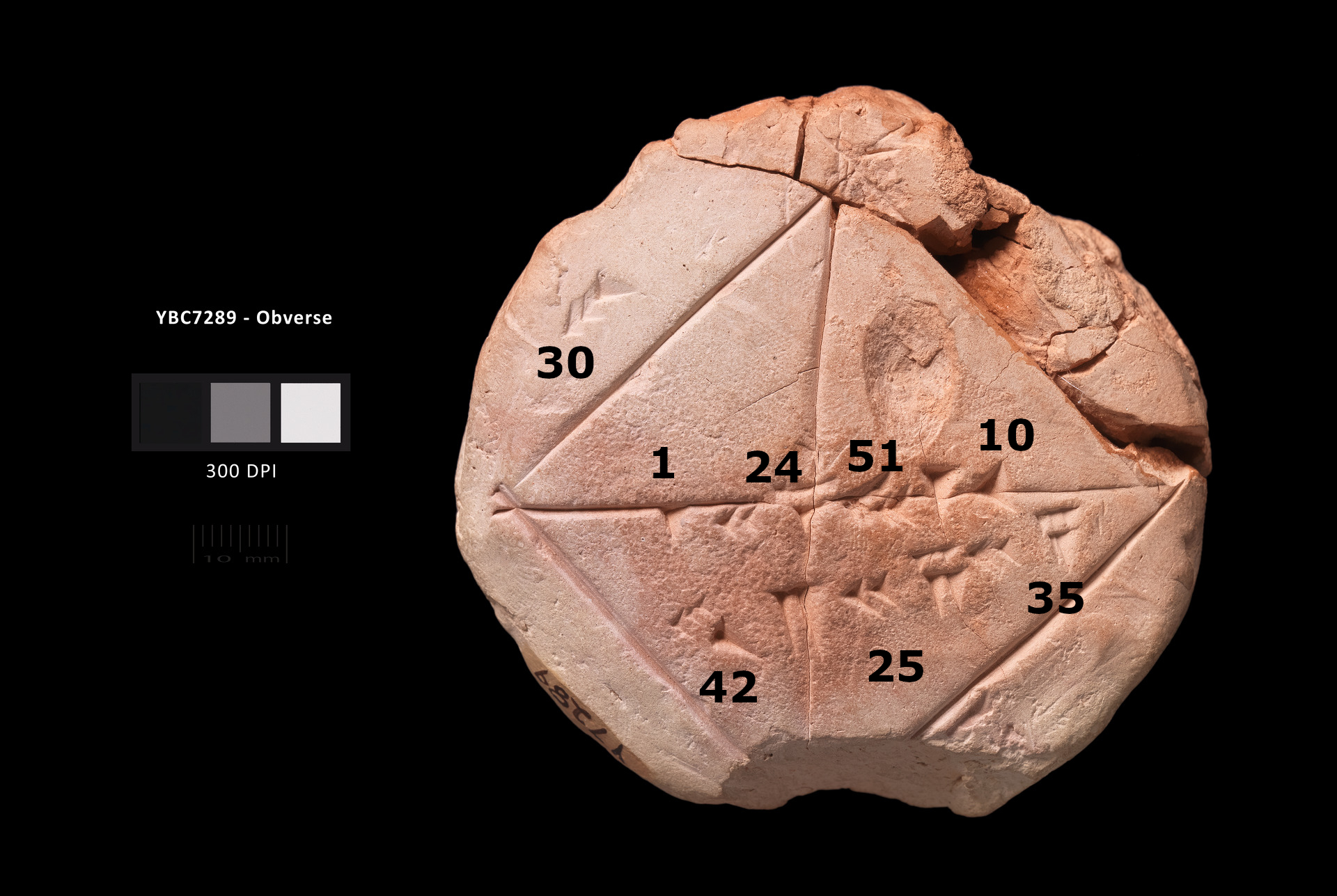
Babylonian clay tablet YBC 7289 with annotations. The diagonal displays an approximation of the square root of 2 in four sexagesimal figures, 1 24 51 10, which is good to about six decimal digits. 1 + 24/60 + 51/60^{2} + 10/60^{3} = 1.41421296... The tablet also gives an example where one side of the square is 30, and the resulting diagonal is 42 25 35 or 42.4263888...

The tablet depicts a square with its two diagonals. One side of the square is labeled with the sexagesimal number 30. The diagonal of the square is labeled with two sexagesimal numbers. The first of these two, 1;24,51,10 represents the fraction 305,470/216,000 ≈ 1.414213, a numerical approximation of the square root of two that is off by less than one part in 2 million. The second of the two numbers is 42;25,35 = 30547/720 ≈ 42.426. This number is the result of multiplying 30 by the given approximation to the square root of two, and approximates the length of the diagonal of a square of side length 30.

Because the Babylonian sexagesimal notation did not indicate which digit had which place value, one alternative interpretation is that the number on the side of the square is 30/60 = 1/2. Under this alternative interpretation, the number on the diagonal is 30,547/43,200 ≈ 0.70711, a close numerical approximation of $\frac{1}{\sqrt{2}}$, the length of the diagonal of a square of side length 1/2, that is also off by less than one part in 2 million. David Fowler and Eleanor Robson write, "Thus we have a reciprocal pair of numbers with a geometric interpretation…". They point out that, while the importance of reciprocal pairs in Babylonian mathematics makes this interpretation attractive, there are reasons for skepticism.

The reverse side is partly erased, but Robson believes it contains a similar problem concerning the diagonal of a rectangle whose two sides and diagonal are in the ratio 3:4:5.

== Interpretation ==
Although YBC 7289 is frequently depicted (as in the photo) with the square oriented diagonally, the standard Babylonian conventions for drawing squares would have made the sides of the square vertical and horizontal, with the numbered side at the top. The small round shape of the tablet, and the large writing on it, suggests that it was a "hand tablet" of a type typically used for rough work by a student who would hold it in the palm of his hand. The student would likely have copied the sexagesimal value of the square root of 2 from a table of constants, but an iterative procedure for computing this value can be found in another Babylonian tablet, BM 96957 + VAT 6598. A table of constants that includes the same approximation of the square root of 2 as YBC 7289 is the tablet YBC 7243. The constant appears on line 10 of the table along with the inscription, "the diagonal of a square".

The mathematical significance of this tablet was first recognized by Otto Neugebauer and Abraham Sachs in 1945. The tablet "demonstrates the greatest known computational accuracy obtained anywhere in the ancient world", the equivalent of six decimal digits of accuracy. Other Babylonian tablets include the computations of areas of hexagons and heptagons, which involve the approximation of more complicated algebraic numbers such as $\sqrt3$. The same number $\sqrt3$ can also be used in the interpretation of certain ancient Egyptian calculations of the dimensions of pyramids. However, the much greater numerical precision of the numbers on YBC 7289 makes it more clear that they are the result of a general procedure for calculating them, rather than merely being an estimate.

The same sexagesimal approximation to $\sqrt2$, 1;24,51,10, was used much later by Greek mathematician Claudius Ptolemy in his Almagest. Ptolemy did not explain where this approximation came from and it may be assumed to have been well known by his time.

== Provenance and curation ==
It is unknown where in Mesopotamia YBC 7289 comes from, but its shape and writing style make it likely that it was created in southern Mesopotamia, sometime between 1800 BC and 1600 BC.

At Yale, the Institute for the Preservation of Cultural Heritage has produced a digital model of the tablet, suitable for 3D printing. The original tablet is currently kept in the Yale Babylonian Collection at Yale University.

== See also ==
- Babylonian mathematics
- Plimpton 322
- IM 67118
