= Tell Muhammad =

Archaeological site in Iraq

- Tell Mohammed
- Location within Iraq
- 33°18′0″N 44°28′10″E
- Type: settlement
- Periods: Bronze Age
- Location: Baghdad, Baghdad Governorate, Iraq

History
- Built: Late 3th millennium BC

Site notes
- Excavation dates: 1850, 1853, 1978-1985, 1999, 2021-2025
- Archaeologists: J. F. Jones, Austen Henry Layard, Sd. Mu'tasim Rashid Abdur-Ra, Nicola Laneri
- Condition: Ruined
- Owner: Public
- Public access: Yes

Tell Muhammad (also Tell Mohammed and Tall Muhammad) is an ancient Near East archaeological site currently in the outskirts of Baghdad, along the Tigris River in the Diyala region. It is a very short distance from the site of Tell Harmal to the north and not far from the site of Tell al-Dhiba'i to the northeast. The ancient name of the site is unknown, though Diniktum has been suggested. The lost city of Akkad has also been proposed. Based on a year name found on one of the cuneiform tablets the name Banaia has also been proposed.

Not to be confused with Tell Mohammed ‘Arab, excavated as part of the Eski Mosul Saddam Dam rescue project in Iraq or Tell Mohammed Diyáb in Syria.

== Archaeology ==
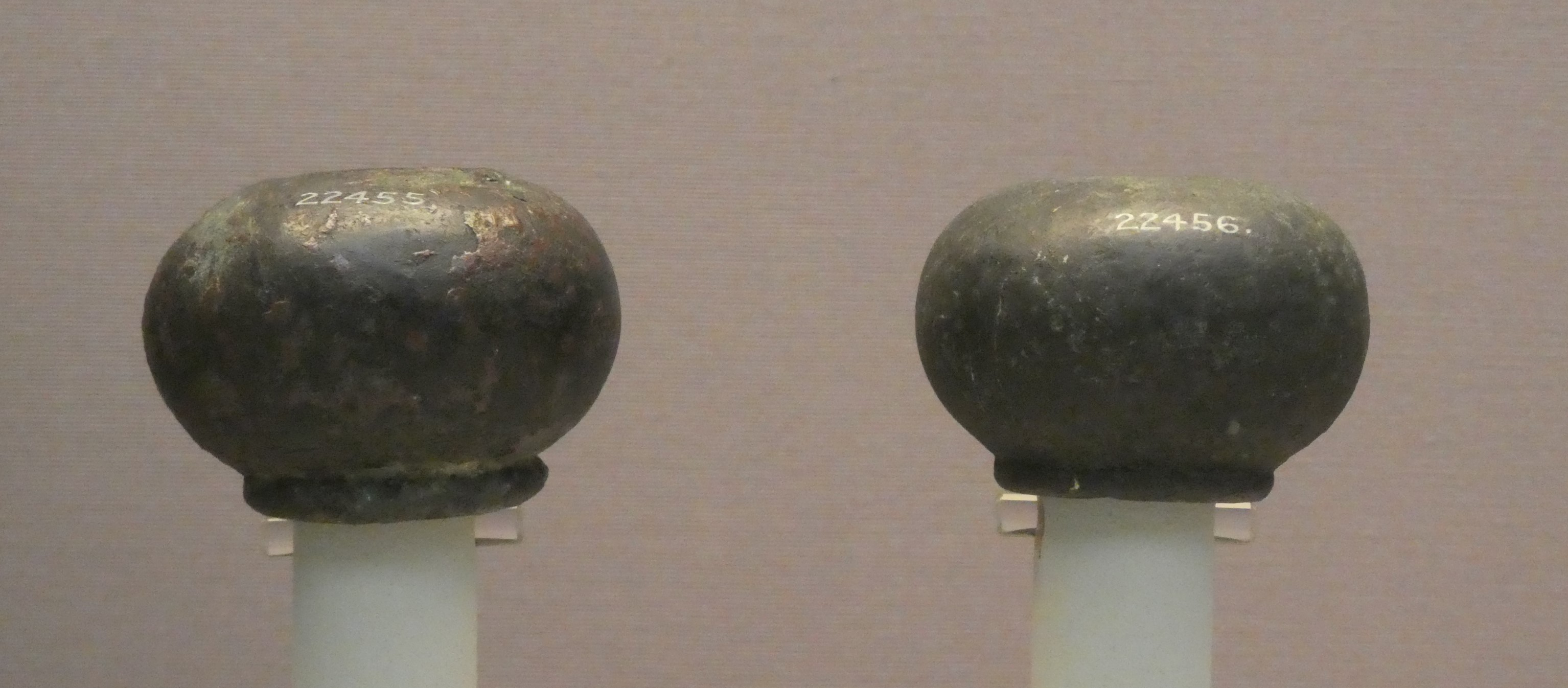
Mace heads Hammurabi Tell Muhammad BM 22455 6

Its original extent was about 25 hectares, now reduced to about 5 hectares with a maximum height of 2.5 meters. There was a six-meter-wide fortification wall, the full extent of which has not been determined. The site, at that time about 6 miles southwest of Baghdad, was excavated by J. F. Jones in 1850. He found several bronze mace heads with an inscription of Hammurabi, ruler of Babylon. The site was examined by A. H. Layard in 1853 who also found mace heads inscribed "E.GAL ha-am-mu-ra-pi" - "(property of) the palace of Hammurabi". In the early 1900s, it was sketched by E. Hertzfeld showing dimensions of 550 meters north to south and 350 meters east to west. In 1957, during an archaeological survey of the region (Adams site #414), it was reported to have been partially destroyed by a modern canal construction. To the northeast there was a large square enclosure (now built over) measuring 900 meters northeast by 900 meters southwest. It was worked on for 8 seasons between 1978 and 1985 and again in 1999 by the Iraqi State Antiquities Organization, under the direction of Sd. Mu'tasim Rashid Abdur-Ra. The excavations have revealed remains dating to the Isin-Larsa, Old Babylonian, and Kassite periods.

A number of Old Babylonian period cuneiform tablets were found in Levels II and III and are now held at the National Museum of Iraq in Baghdad. About 70 of the tablets have been published and are from a private context and record contracts of two generations of a commercial family. Those in Level III carry the old event style date year name formula, and those from Level II carry two dates, one of the event style formula and one of the newer date formula. This is thought to represent a transition from Babylonian to Kassite control. The latest tablets carry only a date formula year name.

Work at the site has resumed under a University of Catania (Baghdad Urban Archaeological Project) effort led by Nicola Laneri of the University of Sicily, with five excavation seasons between 2021 and 2025 to date. Before the site was fenced in 2017, it had been used as an unofficial garbage dump and much of the first season involved removing that garbage. Residential, commercial, and water management areas were examined. Finds included three cylinder seals and several terracotta plaques, models, a toilet, a funerary chapel, and figurines. One cylinder seal was inscribed with the text "Awil-Adad, son of La-sani, servant of Sin". The two month 2025 season worked a production area inside the wall where forges and ovens were found with both metal and food production occurring. More intramural burials were excavated.

Excavators have determined that the site stratigraphy encompassed 8 levels:

- Levels V-VIII - Isin-Larsa - Ur III (late 3rd millennium BC)
- Level IV - Early Old Babylonian (c. 19th century BC)
- Level III - Mid-Early Old Babylonian (c. 18th century BC)
- Level II - Late Old Babylonian (c. 16th - 17th century BC)
- Level I - Kassite (c, 13th - 15th century BC)

where only pottery remains and graves of the Kassite level were found.

== History ==
Tell Muhammad was occupied from the Ur III to the Kassite period but is primarily an Old Babylonian period site (the 1957 survey reported Akkadian Empire period pottery but later excavations were unable to replicate that find). Two rulers are known from recovered tablets, Ḫurbaḫ (Ḫurbaḫ/zum) and Šipta-ulzi, both Kassite names. These match the names of early Kassite rulers on the Synchronic King List. They are thought to have ruled at roughly the same time as Samsu-ditāna (c. 1625 – 1595BC), last ruler of First Dynasty of Babylon and Sealand Dynasty rulers Pešgaldarameš and Ayadaragalama. An alternative proposal is to date these Tell Muhammad rulers to the time of the previous ruler of Babylon, Ammi-Saduqa.

At Tell Muhammad, several tablets, silver loan contracts, were found that were dated with two-year names "Year 38 after Babylon was resettled" and "The year that the Moon was eclipsed". The former year name is of a format used by the Kassites, a change from the event format used through the Old Babylonian period. Attempts have been made to use this eclipse to date the sack of Babylon and its resettlement by the Kassites. Other known year names include "Year in which the son of Ḫurbaḫ was killed in Tupliaš" (mu ša dumu ḫu-ur-ba-aḫ i-na tu-up-li-ia-aš di-kú), "The year when the son of Hurbah became hostile to the king" (mu dumu ḫu-ur-ba-aḫ ki lugal ik-ki-ru), and "Year Ḫurbaḫ restored the gods of Ešnunna" (MU DINGIR.DIDLI ša áš-nun-naki ḫu-ur-ba-aḫ ú-ud-di-šu).

== See also ==
- Cities of the ancient Near East
- Chronology of the ancient Near East
