= Tell al-Dhiba'i =

Archaeological site in Iraq

- Location within Iraq Location within Near East
- 33°19′22″N 44°28′55″E
- Type: settlement
- Periods: Isin-Larsa period, Old Babylonian Empire
- Location: Baghdad Governorate, Iraq
- Region: Mesopotamia

Site notes
- Excavation dates: 1947, 1962, 1982–1984
- Archaeologists: Muhammed Ali Mustafa, Nahida Abdul Feta

Tell al-Dhiba'i, (also Tell edh-Dhiba'i, Tell aḍ-Ḍibāʿī, and Tell adh-Dhiba, Arabic: تل الضباعي), is an archaeological site in Baghdad Governorate (Iraq). It lies within the borders of modern Baghdad near Tell Muhammad and 3 kilometers northeast of Shaduppum (Tell Harmal), more specifically in the neighborhood of New Baghdad. Uzarzalulu/Uzarlulu/Zaralulu (Za-ra-lu-lu^{ki}) has been proposed as the original name of the city. A text found at Tell Harmal mentioned "They swore the oath of Tišpak and Daduša the king (Before Ige-eḫ-luma high official of Zaralulu)". An alternative proposal is Šadlaš. Known rulers of Šadlaš are Sumu-Amnānum, Sumu-numḫim and Sumu-Šamaš. The city was occupied mainly during the Isin-Larsa period and Old Babylonian period. Not to be confused with the Sassanian period site Tell al-Dhiba'i near Uruk. A small (80 meters by 95 meters) site, Tell al-Aleimiyat, lies just to the northeast. It had three phases from Isin-Larsa to Kassite. Three cuneiform tablets and a number of cylinder seals were found there.

== Archaeology ==
The site consists of three mounds covering a rectangular area of about 45000 square meters (300 meters by 150 meters) and rising to 7 meters. The highest mound is to the north. The Directorate-General of Antiquities of Iraq conducted three seasons of excavations, led by Muhammed Ali Mustafa, in 1947, 1962, and 1965. Before excavations began the site, being near Baghdad, had already been extensively dug by looters in some areas in search of tablets and small finds. In 1982–84 an Iraqi State Organization for Antiquities and Heritage team led by Nahida Abdul Feta did some additional excavation on Old Babylonian houses there. A 50 meter by 50 meter section was excavated adjacent to the temple, and around 3200 cuneiform tablets were found of which only one third have been published.

== History ==
Five occupation layers were found on the central mound, underlain by scattered Akkadian Empire and Ur III period remains. The city of Zaralulu was known in the Akkadian Empire period. Level IV was marked by the remains large Kassite era foundations that cut into the lower level. The most significant level was Level V, where roughly 100 cuneiform tablets, mostly business or administrative records, and a temple (14.5 by 18.5 meters) of the god Lasimu (or Lassimu), ^{d}La-si-mu, were uncovered. Lasimu was called "King of Uzarlulu" and 4% of the loan contracts found at the site named him as the creditor. The Level V occupation was destroyed by conflagration, and the site was abandoned. The tablets were mainly administrative and loan contracts. Date formulas on tablets, including the death of Belakum, king of Eshnunna. He was a contemporary of Sumu-la-El (c. 1880–1845 BC) of Babylon, showing this level to date to the early period of the First Dynasty of Babylon. Most of the city rulers had Amorite names. Cylinder seals were also recovered, some the same as at Tell Harmal. The northern and southern mounds had levels III, IV, and V with level III having a large building. The north mound produced a number of tablets and other finds. In total, roughly 300 tablets were found at the site: 183 administrative documents, 45 receipts, 31 letters, 9 loan contracts, 3 mathematical texts and 8 miscellane". An important discovery was a copper-smith operation including most of its tools including bellows, crucibles, and lost wax molds, dated to the Old Babylonian period. There are some Neo-Babylonian and Kassite graves at the surface level of the site.

== See also ==
- Cities of the ancient Near East
- IM 67118
