= Eleanor Robson =

21st-century British academic

- Born: 1969 (age 56–57)
- Occupation: Historian of the ancient world
- Awards: History of Science Society's Pfizer Award (2011)

Academic background
- Education: University of Oxford
- Thesis: Old Babylonian Coefficient Lists and the Wider Context of Mathematics in Ancient Mesopotamia, 2100–1600 BC

Eleanor Robson, FBA (born 1969) is a British Assyriologist and academic. She is Professor of Ancient Middle Eastern History at University College London. She is a former chair of the British Institute for the Study of Iraq and a Quondam fellow of All Souls College, Oxford. She is a Fellow of the British Academy.

== Early life and education ==
Robson was born in 1969. In 1990, she graduated with a BSc in mathematics from the University of Warwick. In 1995, she received a Doctor of Philosophy (DPhil) degree from the University of Oxford for a thesis titled "Old Babylonian coefficient lists and the wider context of mathematics in ancient Mesopotamia 2100-1600 BC".

== Career ==
She was a British Academy postdoctoral research fellow from 1997 to 2000 and then a post-doctoral research fellow at All Souls College from 2000 to 2003, associated with the Faculty of Oriental Studies. From 2004 to 2013 Robson was based at the Department of History and Philosophy of Science at the University of Cambridge.

Robson is the author or co-author of several books on Mesopotamian culture and the history of mathematics. In 2003, she won the Lester R. Ford Award of the Mathematical Association of America for her work on Plimpton 322, a clay tablet of Babylonian mathematics; contrary to previous theories according to which this tablet was of number theoretic character or was trigonometric table, Robson showed that it could have been a collection of school exercises in solving right-triangle problems. She has also been widely quoted for her criticism of the U.S. government's failure to prevent looting at the National Museum of Iraq during the Iraq War in 2003.

Robson has received funding from the AHRC for the Nahrein Network.

Robson was the chair of the Council for the British Institute for the Study of Iraq from 2012 to 2017.

== Honours and awards ==
In 2011 Robson won the History of Science Society's Pfizer Award for her monograph Mathematics in Ancient Iraq: A Social History.

Robson was a visiting lecturer at the College de France in June 2017.

She was elected as a Fellow of the British Academy in 2022.

== Books ==
- —— (1995). Old Babylonian Coefficient Lists and the Wider Context of Mathematics in Ancient Mesopotamia, 2100–1600 BC. Oxford University.
- —— (1999). Mesopotamian Mathematics, 2100–1600 BC: Technical Constants in Bureaucracy and Education. Oxford editions of cuneiform texts 14. Oxford University Press. ISBN 978-0-19-815246-0. The constants of the title, expressed by the Babylonian word igigubbûm, include mathematical constants such as a numerical approximation of π as well as conversion factors between units. Reviewer Leo Depuydt writes that this book "surveys all that is known about constants in Mesopotamian mathematics and advances our insight into their function".
- —— (2003). Campbell-Kelly, Martin; Croarken, Mary; Flood, Raymond G. (eds.). The History of Mathematical Tables: From Sumer to Spreadsheets. Oxford University Press. doi:10.1093/acprof:oso/9780198508410.001.0001. ISBN 978-0-19-850841-0. This edited volume presents papers relating to a 2001 conference of the British Society for the History of Mathematics on mathematical tables. As well as co-editing the volume, Robson provided a paper tracing the history of tables back to 4500 years ago in the ancient Near East.
- Black, Jeremy; Cunningham, Graham; ——; Zólyomi, Gábor (2006). The Literature of Ancient Sumer. Oxford University Press. ISBN 978-0-19-929633-0. This book contains a selection of texts of Sumerian literature, drawn from the Electronic Text Corpus of Sumerian Literature, an Oxford University project in which Robson is a participant. Unlike an earlier collection of Sumerian literature by Thorkild Jacobsen, the translations included in this collection are literal and in plain prose, even when they translate works of poetry.
- ——; Gosden, Chris; Treadwell, Luke, eds. (2006). Who Owns Objects?: The Ethics and Politics of Collecting Cultural Artefacts. Oxbow Books. ISBN 978-1-84217-233-9. This edited volume includes nine articles, many of which take a minority position that defends the collection and expatriation of artefacts from ancient cultures and that critiques the UNESCO Convention on the Means of Prohibiting and Preventing the Illicit Import, Export and Transfer of Ownership of Cultural Property, which bars such collection.
- —— (2008). Mathematics in Ancient Iraq: A Social History. Princeton University Press. ISBN 978-0-691-09182-2. This book is aimed at the general public, and explains both the mathematical ideas from the three-millennium-long history of ancient Mesopotamian mathematics and the context from which they arose. It is organized chronologically; two appendices tabulate Mesopotamian systems of measurement and index nearly all known mathematical clay tablets from the region.
- ——; Stedall, Jacqueline A., eds. (2009). The Oxford Handbook of the History of Mathematics. Oxford University Press. ISBN 978-0-19-921312-2. The 36 articles in this volume cover a wide range of geography and time. But although, as the title suggests, some of the contents are survey articles, many others are research papers.
