= Diniktum =

Ancient city in Iraq

- Location within Iraq
- Location: Iraq
- Region: Mesopotamia

Diniktum (also Diniktim), inscribed Di_{3}-ni-ik-tum^{KI}, was a still unlocated middle bronze-age town often thought to be located somewhere in the Diyala Governorate of Iraq. Based on texts found at Irisaĝrig it is known that there were temples to Nin-Ištaran and Inana at Diniktum.

== History ==
=== Early Dynastic period ===
Based on lexical texts, primarily the List of Geographical Names, Diniktum existed in the Early Dynastic II period.

=== Ur III period ===
Messenger texts from Girsu during the reign of Ur III ruler Šulgi mention Diniktum 16 times. In that period Diniktum was under the control of the Ur III governor at Irisaĝrig.

=== Middle Bronze ===
It enjoyed independence briefly during the 18th century under the reigns of the Amorite chieftains (ra-bí-an MAR.DÚ) Itur-šarrum, attested on a single seal from Ešnunna, and Sîn-gāmil, son of Sîn-šēmi and a contemporary of Zimri-Lim (ca. 1710–1698 BC short) of Mari and Ḫammu-rapī (ca. 1728–1686 BC short) of Babylon, attested in a brick inscription "Sin-gamil, Amorite chief of Diniktum, son of Sin-semi.". In an old Babylonian letter from Yarim-Lim I, the king of Yamḫad to the Yašub-Yahad, the king of Dēr, he says:

.. Certainly. Sîn-gāmil, king of Diniktum. very much like you would repeatedly respond to me by means of lies and provocations. Having docked 500 boats in Diniktum's quay. I "sank" (supported?) his land as well as him for 12 year!"

— Iarīm-Līm, Tablet A. 1314, Letter to Yašub-Yahad

Yarim-Lim I would defeat the king of Diniktum in battle.

One king of Diniktum named Itur-šarrum ruled Diniktum for around a century before his successor Sîn-gāmil became the new ruler of the kingdom.

Ikūn-pî-Sîn (“The word of Sin is truthful”), the ruler of Nērebtum (Tell Ishchali) and possibly Tutub, cities in the sphere of Ešnunna, has a year name: “Year when Ikū(n)-pî-Sîn captured Diniktum." It was absorbed into the kingdom of Ešnunna and consequently embroiled in its conflicts with Elam during the reigns of Ibāl-pî-El II (ca. 1715–1701 BC short) and Ṣillī-Sîn (ca. 1700–1698 BC short). During an Elamite invasion of Mesopotamia the Elamites sacked Eshnunna. This caused many soldiers in the Elamite army that were from Eshnunna to defect. Because of the mass desertion, the Elamite king retreated back to Diniktum. While in Diniktum, the Elamites would sue for peace with Hammurabi. The Elamites were then driven from the city.

=== Late Bronze ===
The town was still settled in the later bronze-age, as a year name of 15th century BC Kassite ruler Kadashman-harbe I reads "the year [in which] Kadašman-Ḫarbe, the king, dug the canal of Diniktum".

== Location ==
An early proposal was on the Tigris river downstream from Upi and close to the northern border of Elam. It has also been suggested as being at or in the vicinity of Tell Muhammad, which lies in south-eastern part of modern Baghdad. Diniktum is mentioned in the Harmal geographical list, Tablet IM 51143.

The site of Tell Harmal has been proposed as the location of Diniktum.

In a survey of archaeological sites in the Diyala region of Iraq a site, Tell #851, was identified as a possible location for Diniktum. It showed surface remains from the Ubaid to Kassite periods. A local resident there turned in six UrIII/Larsa cylinder seals (one mentioned the god Ninib) and an inscribed brick. The brick read "Sîn-gāmil the great leader of Martu of the city Diniktum son of Sin-šemi".

It is thought to have been near the towns of Anzagar, Malkum, Agar-Suen, Gizuna, and Babaz. And on the road leading from Irisaĝrig to Der.

A text from Mari which describes an Elamite army retreating from Eshnunna to Elam via Diniktum "... the Elamites looted the city of Ešnuna, (and then) they retreated to Diniktum. (Now) they have left Dinikitum for their land ...", indicates that Diniktum was to the east of Eshnunna.

== See also ==
- Cities of the ancient Near East
