= Mary Croarken =

British historian of mathematics and computing

Mary G. Croarken is a British independent scholar and author in the history of mathematics and the history of computing.

== Education and career ==
Croarken earned a degree in computer science from the University of Warwick in 1982 and a doctorate in the history of science there in 1986, supervised by Martin Campbell-Kelly, who describes her as one of his two most successful students.

After leaving academia to raise a family in Norwich, she became a health research manager in the National Health Service, while continuing to work in the history of science as an independent scholar. She has been a research fellow at the National Maritime Museum in Greenwich and in the computer science department at the University of Warwick.

== Books ==
Croarken is the author of the book Early Scientific Computing in Britain (Clarendon Press, 1990). She is a co-editor of The History of Mathematical Tables: from Sumer to Spreadsheets (Oxford University Press, 2003) and of Mathematics at the Meridian: The History of Mathematics at Greenwich (Chapman & Hall / CRC, 2020)
