= Martin Campbell-Kelly =

Computing professor

- Born: c. 1960 (aged c. 64)
- Education: Sunderland Polytechnic (PhD)
- Known for: History of computing
- Scientific career
- Fields: History of science; History of computing
- Workplaces: University of Warwick
- Thesis: Foundations of computer programming in Britain 1945-1955 (1980)
- Doctoral students: Mary Croarken

Martin Campbell-Kelly FCBS FLSW (born c. 1960) is an Emeritus Professor at the University of Warwick who has specialised in the history of computing.

== Education ==
Campbell-Kelly was educated at Sunderland Polytechnic where he was awarded a PhD in 1980 on the Foundations of computer programming in Britain 1945–1955.

== Research ==
Campbell-Kelly has authored, edited numerous books and journal articles on the history of computing.

He served on the editorial board of the IEEE Annals of the History of Computing journal. He is a committee member of the Computer Conservation Society, a Specialist Group of the British Computer Society, and is a Gresham College lecturer.

In 2011, Campbell-Kelly was elected a Fellow of the Learned Society of Wales.
