= Babylonian mathematics =

Mathematics used in ancient Mesopotamia

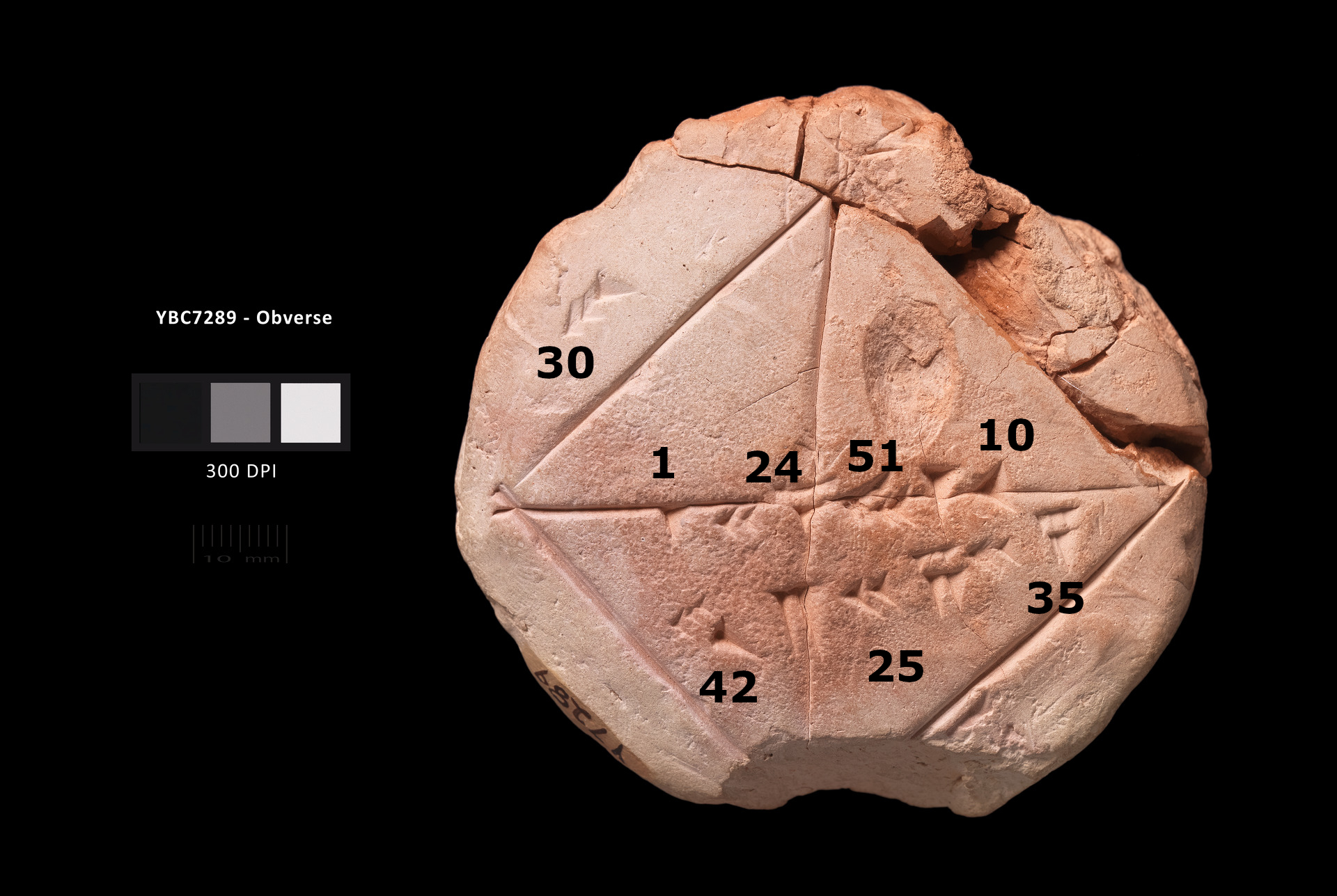
Babylonian clay tablet YBC 7289 with annotations. The diagonal displays an approximation of the square root of 2 in four sexagesimal figures, 1 24 51 10, which is good to about six decimal digits. 1 + 24/60 + 51/60^{2} + 10/60^{3} = 1.41421296... The tablet also gives an example where one side of the square is 30, and the resulting diagonal is 42 25 35 or 42.4263888...

Babylonian mathematics (also known as Assyro-Babylonian mathematics) is the mathematics developed or practiced by the people of Mesopotamia, as attested by sources surviving mainly from the Old Babylonian period (1830–1531 BC) to the Seleucid period from the last three or four centuries BC. With respect to content, there is scarcely any difference between the two groups of texts. Babylonian mathematics remained constant, in character and content, for over a millennium.

In contrast to the scarcity of sources in Ancient Egyptian mathematics, knowledge of Babylonian mathematics is derived from hundreds of clay tablets unearthed since the 1850s. Written in cuneiform, tablets were inscribed while the clay was moist, and baked hard in an oven or by the heat of the sun. The majority of recovered clay tablets date from 1800 to 1600 BC, and cover topics that include fractions, algebra, quadratic and cubic equations and the Pythagorean theorem. The Babylonian tablet YBC 7289 gives an approximation of $\sqrt{2}$ accurate to three significant sexagesimal digits (about six significant decimal digits).

== Origins ==
Babylonian mathematics is a range of numeric and more advanced mathematical practices in the ancient Near East, written in cuneiform script. Studies have historically focused on the First Babylonian dynasty old Babylonian period in the early second millennium BC due to the wealth of data available. There has been debate over the earliest appearance of Babylonian mathematics, with historians suggesting a range of dates between the 5th and 3rd millennia BC. Babylonian mathematics was primarily written on clay tablets in cuneiform script in the Akkadian or Sumerian languages.

"Babylonian mathematics" is perhaps an unhelpful term since the earliest suggested origins date to the use of accounting devices, such as bullae and tokens, in the 5th millennium BC.

== Babylonian numerals ==
The Babylonian system of mathematics was a sexagesimal (base 60) numeral system. From this we derive the modern-day usage of 60 seconds in a minute, 60 minutes in an hour, and 360 degrees in a circle. The Babylonians were able to make great advances in mathematics for two reasons. Firstly, the number 60 is a superior highly composite number, having factors of 1, 2, 3, 4, 5, 6, 10, 12, 15, 20, 30, and 60 (including those that are themselves composite), facilitating calculations with fractions. Additionally, unlike the Egyptians and Romans, the Babylonians had a true place-value system, where digits written in the left column represented larger values (much as, in our base ten system, 734 = 7×100 + 3×10 + 4×1).

== Old Babylonian mathematics (2000–1600 BC) ==
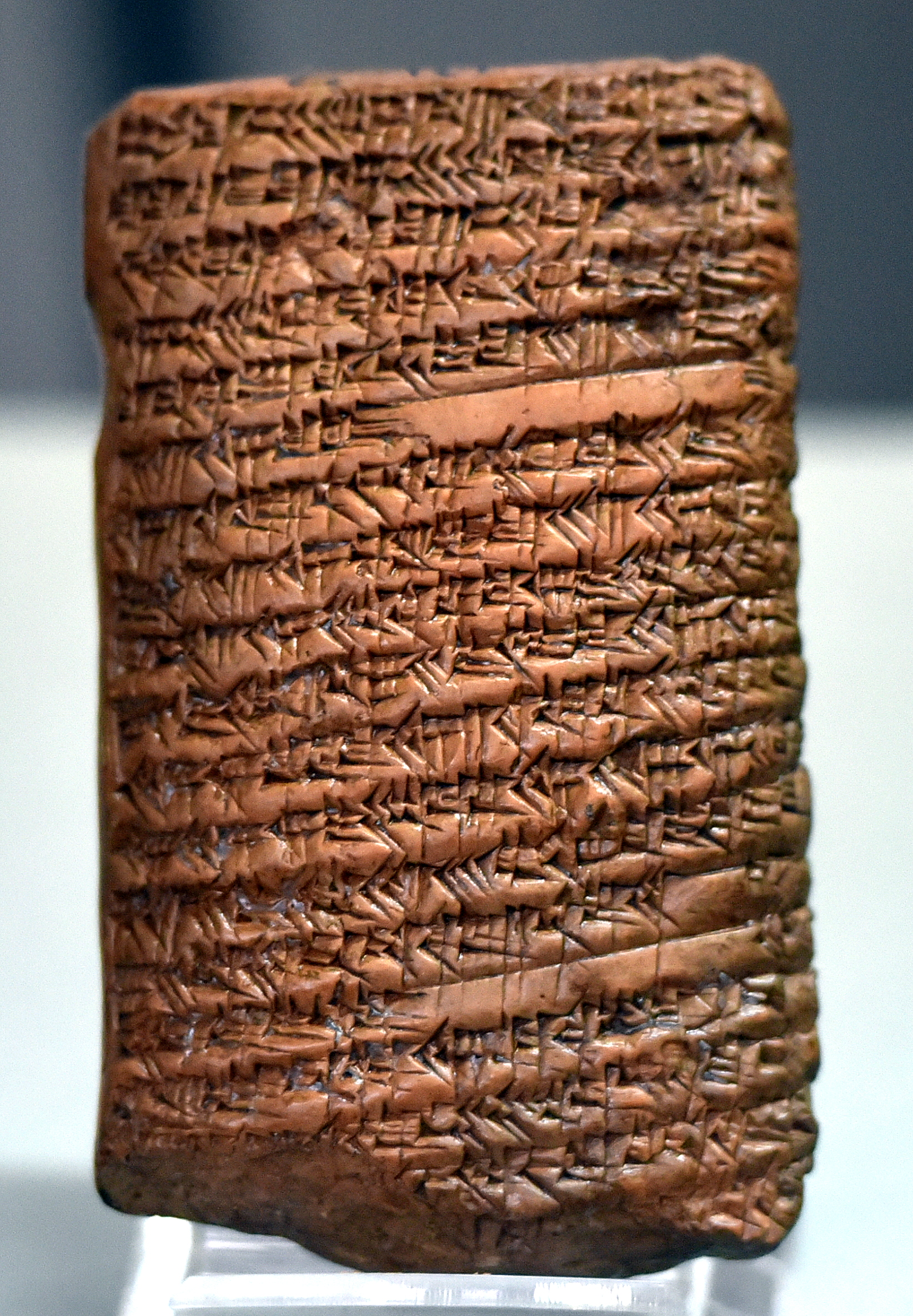
Clay tablet, mathematical, geometric-algebraic, similar to the Pythagorean theorem. From Tell al-Dhabba'i, Iraq. 2003–1595 BC. Iraq Museum

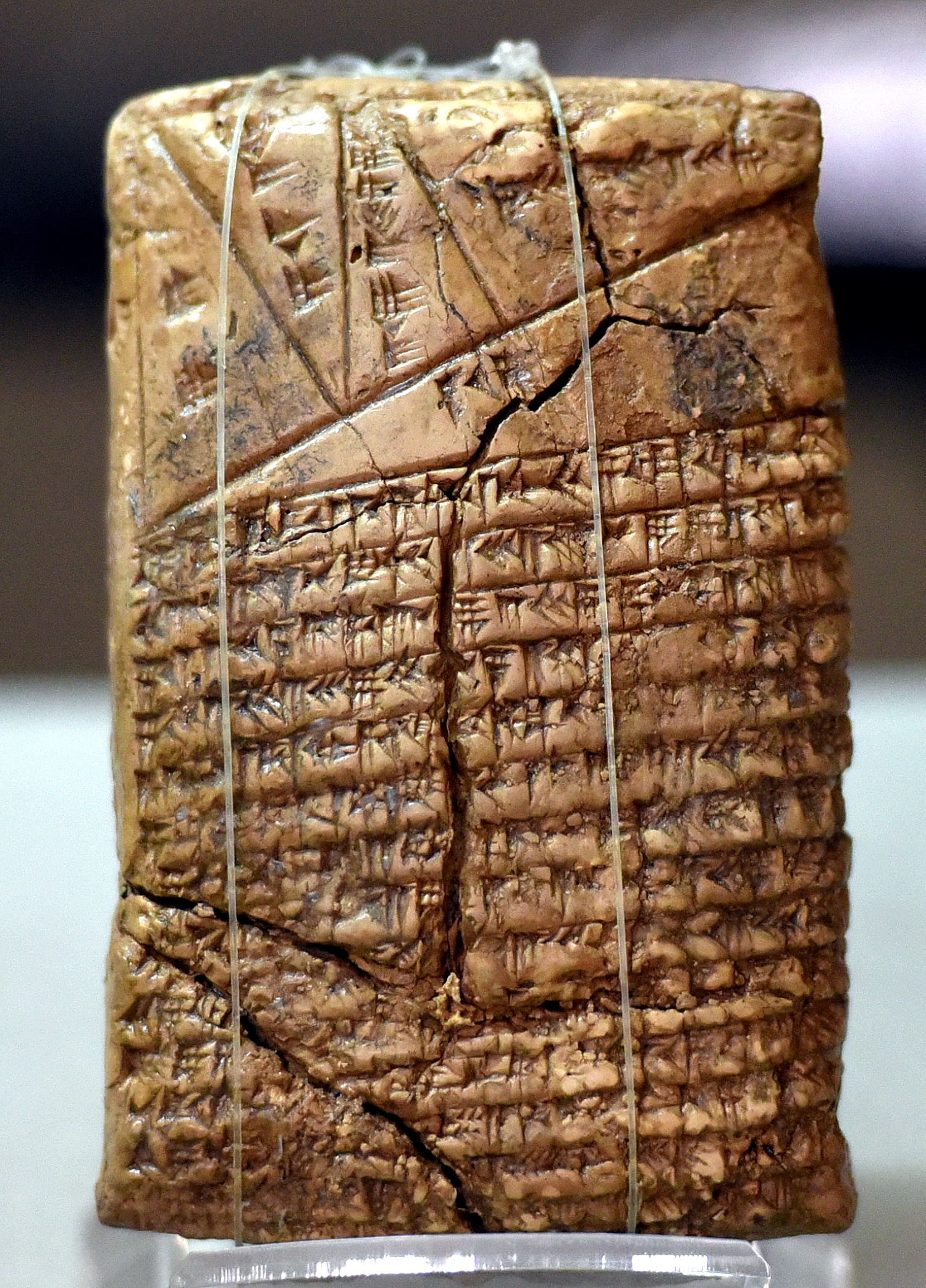
Clay tablet, mathematical, geometric-algebraic, similar to the Euclidean geometry. From Tell Harmal, Iraq. 2003–1595 BC. Iraq Museum

=== Arithmetic ===
The Babylonians used pre-calculated tables to assist with arithmetic, including multiplication tables, tables of reciprocals, and tables of squares (or, by using the same table in the opposite way, tables of square roots). Their multiplication tables were not the $60\times 60$ tables that one might expect by analogy to decimal multiplication tables. Instead, they kept only tables for multiplication by certain "principal numbers" (the regular numbers and 7). To calculate other products, they would split one of the numbers to be multiplied into a sum of principal numbers.

Although many Babylonian tablets record exercises in multi-digit multiplication, these typically jump directly from the numbers being multiplied to their product, without showing intermediate values. Based on this, and on certain patterns of mistakes in some of these tablets, Jens Høyrup has suggested that long multiplication was performed in such a way that each step of the calculation erased the record of previous steps, as would happen using an abacus or counting board and would not happen with written long multiplication. A rare exception, "the only one of its kind known", is the Late Babylonian/Seleucid tablet BM 34601, which has been reconstructed as computing the square of a 13-digit sexagesimal number (the number $5\cdot 3^{25}$) using a "slanting column of partial products" resembling modern long multiplication.

The Babylonians did not have an algorithm for long division. Instead they based their method on the fact that:

$$\frac{a}{b} = a \times \frac{1}{b}$$

together with a table of reciprocals. Numbers whose only prime factors are 2, 3 or 5 (known as 5-smooth or regular numbers) have finite reciprocals in sexagesimal notation, and tables with extensive lists of these reciprocals have been found.

Reciprocals such as 1/7, 1/11, 1/13, etc. do not have finite representations in sexagesimal notation. To compute 1/13 or to divide a number by 13 the Babylonians would use an approximation such as:

$$\frac{1}{13} = \frac{7}{91} = 7 \times \frac {1}{91} \approx 7 \times \frac{1}{90}=7 \times \frac{40}{3600} = \frac{280}{3600} = \frac{4}{60} + \frac{40}{3600}.$$

The Babylonian clay tablet YBC 7289 (c. 1800–1600 BC) gives an approximation of the square root of 2 in four sexagesimal figures, 𒐕 𒌋𒌋𒐼 𒐐𒐕 𒌋 = 1;24,51,10, which is accurate to about six decimal digits, and is the closest possible three-place sexagesimal representation of √2:

$$1 + \frac{24}{60} + \frac{51}{60^2} + \frac{10}{60^3} = \frac{305470}{216000} = 1.41421\overline{296}.$$

=== Algebra ===
As well as arithmetical calculations, Babylonian mathematicians also developed algebraic methods of solving equations. Once again, these were based on pre-calculated tables.

To solve a quadratic equation, the Babylonians essentially used the standard quadratic formula. They considered quadratic equations of the form:

$$\ x^2 + bx = c$$

where b and c were not necessarily integers, but c was always positive. They knew that a solution to this form of equation is:

$$x = - \frac{b}{2} + \sqrt{ \left ( \frac{b}{2} \right )^2 + c}$$

and they found square roots efficiently using division and averaging. Problems of this type included finding the dimensions of a rectangle given its area and the amount by which the length exceeds the width.

Tables of values of n^{3} + n^{2} were used to solve certain cubic equations. For example, consider the equation:

$$\ ax^3 + bx^2 = c.$$

Multiplying the equation by a^{2} and dividing by b^{3} gives:

$$\left ( \frac{ax}{b} \right )^3 + \left ( \frac {ax}{b} \right )^2 = \frac {ca^2}{b^3}.$$

Substituting y = ax/b gives:

$$y^3 + y^2 = \frac {ca^2}{b^3}$$

which could now be solved by looking up the n^{3} + n^{2} table to find the value closest to the right-hand side. The Babylonians accomplished this without algebraic notation, showing a remarkable depth of understanding. However, they did not have a method for solving the general cubic equation.

=== Growth ===
Babylonians modeled exponential growth, constrained growth (via a form of sigmoid functions), and doubling time, the latter in the context of interest on loans.

Clay tablets from c. 2000 BC include the exercise "Given an interest rate of 1/60 per month (no compounding), compute the doubling time." This yields an annual interest rate of 12/60 = 20%, and hence a doubling time of 100% growth/20% growth per year = 5 years.

=== Plimpton 322 ===
The Plimpton 322 tablet contains a list of "Pythagorean triples", i.e., integers $(a,b,c)$ such that $a^2+b^2=c^2$. The triples are too many and too large to have been obtained by brute force.

Much has been written on the subject, including some speculation (perhaps anachronistic) as to whether the tablet could have served as an early trigonometrical table. Care must be exercised to see the tablet in terms of methods familiar or accessible to scribes at the time.

[...] the question "how was the tablet calculated?" does not have to have the same answer as the question "what problems does the tablet set?" The first can be answered most satisfactorily by reciprocal pairs, as first suggested half a century ago, and the second by some sort of right-triangle problems.

=== Geometry ===
Babylonians knew the common rules for measuring volumes and areas. They measured the circumference of a circle as three times the diameter and the area as one-twelfth the square of the circumference, which would be correct if π is estimated as 3. They were aware that this was an approximation, and one Old Babylonian mathematical tablet excavated near Susa in 1936 (dated to between the 19th and 17th centuries BC) gives a better approximation of π as 25/8 = 3.125, about 0.5 percent below the exact value. The volume of a cylinder was taken as the product of the base and the height, however, the volume of the frustum of a cone or a square pyramid was incorrectly taken as the product of the height and half the sum of the bases. The Pythagorean rule was also known to the Babylonians.

The "Babylonian mile" was a measure of distance equal to about 11.3 km (or about seven modern miles). This measurement for distances eventually was converted to a "time-mile" used for measuring the travel of the Sun, therefore, representing time.

The Babylonian astronomers kept detailed records of the rising and setting of stars, the motion of the planets, and the solar and lunar eclipses, all of which required familiarity with angular distances measured on the celestial sphere.

They also used a form of Fourier analysis to compute an ephemeris (table of astronomical positions), which was discovered in the 1950s by Otto Neugebauer. To make calculations of the movements of celestial bodies, the Babylonians used basic arithmetic and a coordinate system based on the ecliptic, the part of the heavens that the sun and planets travel through.

Tablets kept in the British Museum provide evidence that the Babylonians even had a concept of objects in an abstract mathematical space. The tablets date from between 350 and 50 BC, revealing that the Babylonians understood and used geometry even earlier than previously thought. The Babylonians used a method for estimating the area under a curve by drawing a trapezoid underneath, a technique previously believed to have originated in 14th century Europe. This method of estimation allowed them to, for example, find the distance Jupiter had traveled in a certain amount of time.

== See also ==
- Babylonia
- Babylonian astronomy
- History of mathematics
- Islamic mathematics for mathematics in Islamic Iraq/Mesopotamia
