= Otto E. Neugebauer =

Austrian-American mathematician (1899–1990)

- Born: May 26, 1899; Innsbruck, Austria-Hungary
- Died: February 19, 1990 (aged 90); Princeton, New Jersey
- Education: University of Göttingen
- Spouse: Grete Bruck
- Children: Margo Neugebauer, Gerry Neugebauer
- Parent: Rudolph Neugebauer
- Scientific career
- Fields: History of Science, Mathematics
- Workplaces: Brown University
- Thesis: Die Grundlagen der ägyptischen Bruchrechnung (1926)
- Doctoral advisor: Richard Courant; David Hilbert
- Doctoral students: Asger Aaboe; Bernard R. Goldstein; David Pingree; Olaf Henrik Schmidt

Otto Eduard Neugebauer (May 26, 1899 – February 19, 1990) was an Austrian-American mathematician and historian of science who became known for his research on the history of astronomy and the other exact sciences as they were practiced in antiquity and the Middle Ages. By studying clay tablets, he discovered that the ancient Babylonians knew much more about mathematics and astronomy than had been previously realized. The National Academy of Sciences has called Neugebauer "the most original and productive scholar of the history of the exact sciences, perhaps of the history of science, of our age."

== Career ==
Neugebauer was born in Innsbruck, Austria. His father Rudolph Neugebauer was a railroad construction engineer and a collector and scholar of Oriental carpets. His parents died during his early childhood. During World War I, Neugebauer enlisted in the Austrian Army and served as an artillery lieutenant on the Italian front and then in an Italian prisoner-of-war camp alongside fellow countryman Ludwig Wittgenstein. In 1919, he entered the University of Graz in electrical engineering and physics and in 1921 he transferred to the Ludwig-Maximilians-Universität München. From 1922 to 1924, he studied mathematics at the University of Göttingen under Richard Courant, Edmund Landau, and Emmy Noether. During 1924–1925, he was at the University of Copenhagen, where his interests changed to the history of Egyptian mathematics.

He returned to Göttingen and remained there until 1933. His thesis Die Grundlagen der ägyptischen Bruchrechnung ("The Fundamentals of Egyptian Calculation with Fractions") (Springer, 1926) was a mathematical analysis of the table in the Rhind Papyrus. In 1927, he received his venia legendi for the history of mathematics and served as Privatdozent. In 1927, his first paper on Babylonian mathematics was an account of the origin of the sexagesimal system.

In 1929, Neugebauer founded Quellen und Studien zur Geschichte der Mathematik, Astronomie und Physik (QS), a Springer series devoted to the history of the mathematical sciences, in which he published extended papers on Egyptian computational techniques in arithmetic and geometry, including the Moscow Papyrus, the most important text for geometry. Neugebauer had worked on the Moscow Papyrus in Leningrad in 1928.

In 1931, he founded the review journal Zentralblatt für Mathematik und ihre Grenzgebiete (Zbl), his most important contribution to modern mathematics. When Adolf Hitler became chancellor in 1933, Neugebauer was asked to sign an oath of loyalty to the new German government, but he refused and was promptly suspended from employment. In 1934, he joined the University of Copenhagen as a full professor of mathematics. In 1936, he published a paper on the method of dating and analyzing texts using diophantine equations. During 1935–1937, he published a corpus of texts named Mathematische Keilschrift-Texte (MKT). MKT was a colossal work, in size, detail, and depth, and its contents showed that Babylonian mathematics far surpassed anything one could imagine from a knowledge of Egyptian and Greek mathematics. He was an Invited Speaker of the ICM in 1928 in Bologna and a Plenary Speaker of the ICM in 1936 in Oslo.

In 1939, after the Zentralblatt was taken over by the Nazis, he moved to the United States, joined the mathematics department at Brown University, and founded Mathematical Reviews. He became an American citizen and remained at Brown for most of his career, founding the History of Mathematics Department there in 1947 and becoming University Professor. Jointly with the American Assyriologist Abraham Sachs, he published Mathematical Cuneiform Texts in 1945, which has remained a standard English-language work on Babylonian mathematics. In 1967, he was awarded the Henry Norris Russell Lectureship by the American Astronomical Society. In 1977, he was elected to the National Academy of Sciences, and in 1979, he received the Award for Distinguished Service to Mathematics from the Mathematical Association of America. In 1984, he moved to the Institute for Advanced Study in Princeton, where he had been a member since 1950.

Neugebauer was also interested in chronology. He was able to reconstruct the Alexandrian Christian calendar and its origin from the Alexandrian Jewish calendar as of about the 4th century, at least 200 years prior to any other source for either calendar. Thus, the Jewish calendar was derived by combining the 19-year cycle using the Alexandrian year with the seven-day week, and was then slightly modified by the Christians to prevent Easter from ever coinciding with Passover. The ecclesiastical calendar, considered by church historians to be highly scientific and deeply complex, turned out to be quite simple.

In 1988, by studying a scrap of Greek papyrus, Neugebauer discovered the most important single piece of evidence to date for the extensive transmission of Babylonian astronomy to the Greeks and for the continuing use of Babylonian methods for 400 years even after Ptolemy wrote the Almagest. His last paper, "From Assyriology to Renaissance Art", published in 1989, detailed the history of a single astronomical parameter, the mean length of the synodic month, from cuneiform tablets, to the papyrus fragment just mentioned, to the Jewish calendar, to an early 15th-century book of hours.

In 1986, Neugebauer was awarded the Balzan Prize "for his fundamental research into the exact sciences in the ancient world, in particular, on ancient Mesopotamian, Egyptian and Greek astronomy, which has put our understanding of ancient science on a new footing and illuminated its transmission to the classical and medieval worlds. For his outstanding success in promoting interest and further research in the history of science" (Motivation of the Balzan General Prize Committee). Neugebauer donated the prize money of 250,000 Swiss francs to the Institute for Advanced Study.

Neugebauer began his career as a mathematician, then turned to Egyptian and Babylonian mathematics, and then took up the history of mathematical astronomy. In a career which spanned sixty-five years, he largely created modern understanding of mathematical astronomy in Babylon and Egypt, through Greco-Roman antiquity, to India, the Islamic world, and Europe of the Middle Ages and the Renaissance. The noted physicist and astronomer Gerry Neugebauer at Caltech was his son.

== Prizes and honors ==
- John F. Lewis Prize (American Philosophical Society, 1952)
- Heineman Prize for the Exact Sciences, 1953
- American Council of Learned Societies' Award (1961)
- Henry Norris Russell Lectureship (1967)
- Austrian Decoration for Science and Art (1973)
- Pfizer Award (1975 and 1985; History of Science Society)
- Distinguished Service Award, Mathematical Association of America (1979)
- Balzan Prize (1986) for pioneering studies in the field of exact sciences in antiquity, especially Mesopotamian, Egyptian and Greek astronomy
- Benjamin Franklin Medal (American Philosophical Society, 1987)
- Susan Culver Rosenberger Medal of Honor (Brown University, 1987)
- Honorary doctorates from University of St Andrews (1938), Princeton University (1957) and Brown University (1971)
- Member of various scientific academies in Vienna, Paris, Copenhagen and Brussels, the British Academy, the Irish Academy, the National Academy of Sciences, the American Philosophical Society

In 1936, he gave a plenary lecture at the International Congress of Mathematicians in Oslo. This was about pre-Greek mathematics and its position relative to the Greek.

== Select publications ==
=== Articles ===
- 'The Chronology of the Hammurabi Age', in Journal of the American Oriental Society, vol. lxi (New Haven: Yale University Press, 1941).
- "The History of Ancient Astronomy Problems and Methods." Journal of Near Eastern Studies 4 (1945): 1–38.
- "Studies in Ancient Astronomy. VIII. The Water Clock in Babylonian Astronomy." Isis, Vol. 37, No. 1/2, pp. 37–43. (May, 1947). JSTOR link. Reprinted in Neugebauer (1983), pp. 239–245 (*).
- "The Early History of the Astrolabe." Isis 40 (1949): 240–56.
- "The Study of Wretched Subjects." Isis 42 (1951): 111.
- "On the 'Hippopede' of Eudoxus." Scripta Mathematica 19 (1953): 225–29.
- "Apollonius' Planetary Theory." Communications on Pure and Applied Mathematics 8 (1955): 641–48.
- "The Equivalence of Eccentric and Epicyclic Motion According to Apollonius." Scripta Mathematica 24 (1959): 5–21.
- "Thabit Ben Qurra 'On the Solar Year' and 'On the Motion of the Eighth Sphere.'" Proceedings of the American Philosophical Society 106 (1962): 264–98.
- (with Richard A. Parker) "Egyptian Astronomical Texts: III. Decans, Planets, Constellations, and Zodiacs." (Brown University Press, 1969)
- "On the Allegedly Heliocentric Theory of Venus by Heraclides Ponticus." American Journal of Philology 93 (1973): 600–601.
- "Notes on Autolycus." Centaurus 18 (1973): 66–69.

=== Books ===
- (with Abraham Sachs, eds.). Mathematical Cuneiform Texts. American Oriental Series, vol. 29. New Haven: American Oriental Society, 1945.
- The Exact Sciences in Antiquity. Princeton: Princeton University Press, 1952; 2nd edition, Brown University Press, 1957; reprint, New York: Dover publications, 1969. ISBN 978-0-486-22332-2
- Astronomical Cuneiform Texts. 3 volumes. London:1956; 2nd edition, New York: Springer, 1983. (Commonly abbreviated as ACT)
- The Astronomical Tables of al-Khwarizmi. Historiskfilosofiske Skrifter udgivet af Det Kongelige Danske Videnskabernes Selskab, Bind 4, nr. 2. Copenhagen: Ejnar Munksgaard, 1962.
- Ethiopic Astronomy and Computus. Vienna: Verlag der Österreichischen Akademie der Wissenschaften, 1979.
- A History of Ancient Mathematical Astronomy, 3 vols. Berlin: Springer, 1975. (Commonly abbreviated as HAMA.)
- Astronomy and History: Selected Essays. New York: Springer, 1983.
- (with Noel Swerdlow) Mathematical Astronomy in Copernicus' De Revolutionibus. New York: Springer, 1984. ISBN 978-1-4613-8262-1
