= 1750 Eckert =

Mars-crossing asteroid

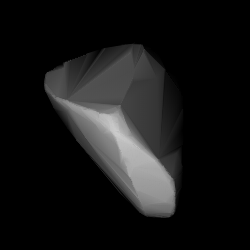
- Shape model of Eckert from its lightcurve

Discovery
- Discovered by: K. Reinmuth
- Discovery site: Heidelberg Obs.
- Discovery date: 15 July 1950

Designations
- Named after: Wallace Eckert (astronomer)
- Alternative designations: 1950 NA_{1} · 1950 OA
- Minor planet category: Mars-crosser · Hungaria

Orbital characteristics
- Epoch 4 September 2017 (JD 2458000.5)
- Uncertainty parameter 0
- Observation arc: 66.89 yr (24,431 days)
- Aphelion: 2.2597 AU
- Perihelion: 1.5932 AU
- Semi-major axis: 1.9265 AU
- Eccentricity: 0.1730
- Orbital period (sidereal): 2.67 yr (977 days)
- Mean anomaly: 346.00°
- Inclination: 19.084°
- Longitude of ascending node: 273.76°
- Argument of perihelion: 109.00°
- Earth MOID: 0.6934 AU

Physical characteristics
- Dimensions: 6.95±0.21 km 6.97 km (calculated)
- Synodic rotation period: 4.49±0.01 h (dated); 375±5 h 377.5±0.5 h
- Geometric albedo: 0.20 (assumed); 0.203±0.013
- Spectral type: B–V = 0.885; U–B = 0.500; Tholen = S · S
- Absolute magnitude (H): 13.15 · 13.67±0.33

1750 Eckert, provisional designation 1950 NA_{1}, is a stony slow rotating Hungaria asteroid and Mars-crosser from the inner regions of the asteroid belt, approximately 7 kilometers in diameter. It was discovered on 15 July 1950, by German astronomer Karl Reinmuth at Heidelberg Observatory in southern Germany. It was named after American astronomer Wallace Eckert.

== Classification and orbit ==
The Mars crossing asteroid is also a member of the Hungaria family, a group that forms the innermost dense concentration of asteroids in the Solar System. It orbits the Sun at a distance of 1.6–2.3 AU once every 2 years and 8 months (977 days). Its orbit has an eccentricity of 0.17 and an inclination of 19° with respect to the ecliptic. As no precoveries were taken, and no prior identifications were made, Eckert's observation arc begins with its official discovery observation.

== Rotation period ==
In October 2009, a rotational lightcurve of Eckert was obtained by American astronomer Brian Warner at his Palmer Divide Observatory (716) in Colorado. It gave an exceptionally long rotation period of 375 hours with a brightness variation of 0.87 magnitude (U=3-). A modeled lightcurve obtained from the Lowell Photometric Database in 2016, gave a similar period of 377.5 hours (U=n.a.). Eckert has the sixth-longest rotation period of all known Mars-crossers.

== Diameter and albedo ==
According to the survey carried out by the Japanese Akari satellite, the asteroid measures 6.95 kilometers in diameter, and its surface has an albedo of 0.203. The Collaborative Asteroid Lightcurve Link agrees with Akarai and assumes a standard albedo for stony asteroids of 0.20 and calculates a diameter of 6.97 kilometers with an absolute magnitude of 13.15.

== Naming ==
The minor planet was named in memory of American astronomer Wallace Eckert (1902–1971), director at the United States Naval Observatory from 1940 to 1945, president of IAU's Commission 7, and pioneer in the use of automatic computing machines. In the late 1940s and early 1950s, he used the then most powerful computing machines ever built, SSEC and NORC, for astronomical calculations. The asteroid 1625 The NORC was named after one of these early super-computers. Eckert also produced the integration of the orbits of the five outer planets in collaboration with Brouwer and Clemence, after whom the minor planets 1746 Brouwer and 1919 Clemence were named. By use of sophisticated computing techniques, Eckert was able to check and extend Brown's lunar theory (also see 1643 Brown). The official naming citation was published by the Minor Planet Center on 20 February 1976 (M.P.C. 3934).
