= Seleucus of Seleucia =

Hellenistic astronomer and philosopher

- Σέλευκος ὁ Σελεύκειος
- Born: c. 190 BC; Seleucia, Seleucid Empire
- Died: c. 150 BC unknown
- Scientific career
- Fields: Astronomy; Philosophy

Seleucus of Seleucia (Greek: Σέλευκος Seleukos; born c. 190 BC; fl. c. 150 BC) was a Hellenistic astronomer and philosopher. Coming from Seleucia on the Tigris, Mesopotamia, the capital of the Seleucid Empire, or, alternatively, Seleukia on the Erythraean Sea, he is best known as a proponent of heliocentrism and for his theory of the causes of tides.

== Heliocentric theory ==
Seleucus is known to have supported the heliocentric theory of Aristarchus of Samos, which stated that the Earth rotated around its own axis which in turn revolved around the Sun. According to Plutarch, Seleucus was the first to demonstrate the heliocentric system through reasoning, but it is not known what arguments he used. According to Bartel Leendert van der Waerden, Seleucus may have constructed his heliocentric theory by determining the constants of a geometric model and by developing methods to compute planetary positions using this model, as Nicolaus Copernicus later did in the 16th century. He may have used trigonometric methods that were available in his time, as he was a contemporary of Hipparchus.

Since the time of Heraclides Ponticus (387 BC–312 BC), the inferior planets Mercury and Venus have been at times named solar planets, as their positions diverge from the Sun by only a small angle.

According to the Greek geographer Strabo, Seleucus was also the first to assume the universe to be infinite. None of his original writings have survived, though a fragment of his work has survived only in Arabic translation, which was later referred to by the Persian philosopher Muhammad ibn Zakariya al-Razi (865–925).

== Tides ==
According to Lucio Russo, Seleucus' arguments for a heliocentric theory were probably related to the phenomenon of tides. The annual cycle of tides (which was studied by Seleucus) can indeed hardly be explained in a geocentric system. Seleucus correctly theorized that tides were caused by the Moon, explaining that the interaction was mediated by the pneuma. He noted that the tides varied in time and strength in different parts of the world. According to Russo, Seleucus ascribed tides both to the Moon and to a whirling motion of the Earth, which could be interpreted as the motion of the Earth around the Earth-Moon center of mass.

According to Strabo (3.5.9), Seleucus was the first to state that the tides are due to the attraction of the Moon, and that the height of the tides depends on the Moon's position relative to the Sun.

== Seleucus in Strabo ==
Seleucus is known from the writings of Plutarch, Aetius, and Strabo, all of whom were Greeks, and the Persian Muhammad ibn Zakariya al-Razi. Strabo lists Seleucus as one of the four most influential "Chaldean" astronomers:

In Chapter XVI of his Geographia, Strabo mentions several "Chaldaen" astronomers. At the end he adds: "Seleukios of Seleukia was a Chaldaean too." ... Babylonian astrologers and astronomers were often called "Chaldaeans." Strabo calls them "the so-called Chaldaeans". Their writings were translated into Greek and used by later authors like Geminos. The "Chaldaean" astronomers mentioned by Strabo are Kidenas, Naburianos, Sudines, and Seleukos. The first two are also known from astronomical cuneiform texts under their Akkadian names Nabu-Rimannu and Kidinnu.

== See also ==
- Babylonian astronomy
- Greek astronomy
- Discourse on the Tides

== Sources ==
- Neugebauer, O. (1945), "The History of Ancient Astronomy. Problems and Methods", Journal of Near Eastern Studies, 4 (1): 1–38, doi:10.1086/370729
- Russo, Lucio (2003), Flussi e riflussi, Milano: Feltrinelli, ISBN 88-07-10349-4
- Sarton, George (1955), "Chaldaean Astronomy of the Last Three Centuries B. C.", Journal of the American Oriental Society, 75 (3): 166–173, doi:10.2307/595168, JSTOR 595168
- Van der Waerden, B. L. (1987), "The Heliocentric System in Greek, Persian and Hindu Astronomy", Annals of the New York Academy of Sciences, 500 (1): 525–545, Bibcode:1987NYASA.500..525V, doi:10.1111/j.1749-6632.1987.tb37224.x
