= Hermann Hunger =

Austrian Assyriologist (born 1942)

- Born: 30 June 1942 (age 84); Bautzen
- Occupations: scholar and professor

Academic background
- Education: University of Vienna; University of Heidelberg; University of Münster
- Doctoral advisor: Wolfram von Soden

Academic work
- Discipline: Assyriology
- Institutions: University of Vienna; University of Chicago Oriental Institute
- Main interests: Babylonian astronomy
- Notable works: Chicago Assyrian Dictionary

Hermann Hunger (born 30 June 1942 in Bautzen) is an Austrian Assyriologist, professor emeritus of Assyriology at the University of Vienna, from which he retired in 2007. He has been recognized for his work on Babylonian astronomy and celestial omens.

== Biography ==
Hermann Hunger is son of the Byzantinist Herbert Hunger.

=== Education ===
Hunger studied oriental studies at the University of Vienna after graduating in 1960. In 1963/64 he studied Assyriology and Arabic at the University of Heidelberg and from 1964 to 1966 at the University of Münster, where he received his doctorate in Assyriology and Semitic philology (Babylonian and Assyrian colophones) in 1966 under the tutelage of Wolfram von Soden.

=== Academic work ===
From 1967 to 1970 he was an epigraphist member at the German Archaeological Institute in Baghdad. From 1970 to 1973 he was Research Associate at the University of Chicago and then until 1976 assistant at the Institute for Oriental Studies at the University of Vienna, where he completed his habilitation. From 1976 to 1978 he was associate professor at the University of Chicago Oriental Institute and from 1978 he was Associate Professor of Assyriology at the University of Vienna, where he retired in 2007.

He is considered one of the leading authorities on Babylonian astronomy history, where he worked early with Otto Neugebauer and Abraham Sachs, and later with David Pingree. He was collaborator in the Chicago Assyrian Dictionary.

Hunger is a member of the American Philosophical Society and the Austrian Academy of Sciences, of which he is chairman of the Commission for the History of Natural Sciences, Mathematics and Medicine and the Mycenaean Commission. In 2010 he became an honorary member of the American Oriental Society. Hunger is co-editor of the Archiv für Orientforschung.

==== Halley's Comet ====
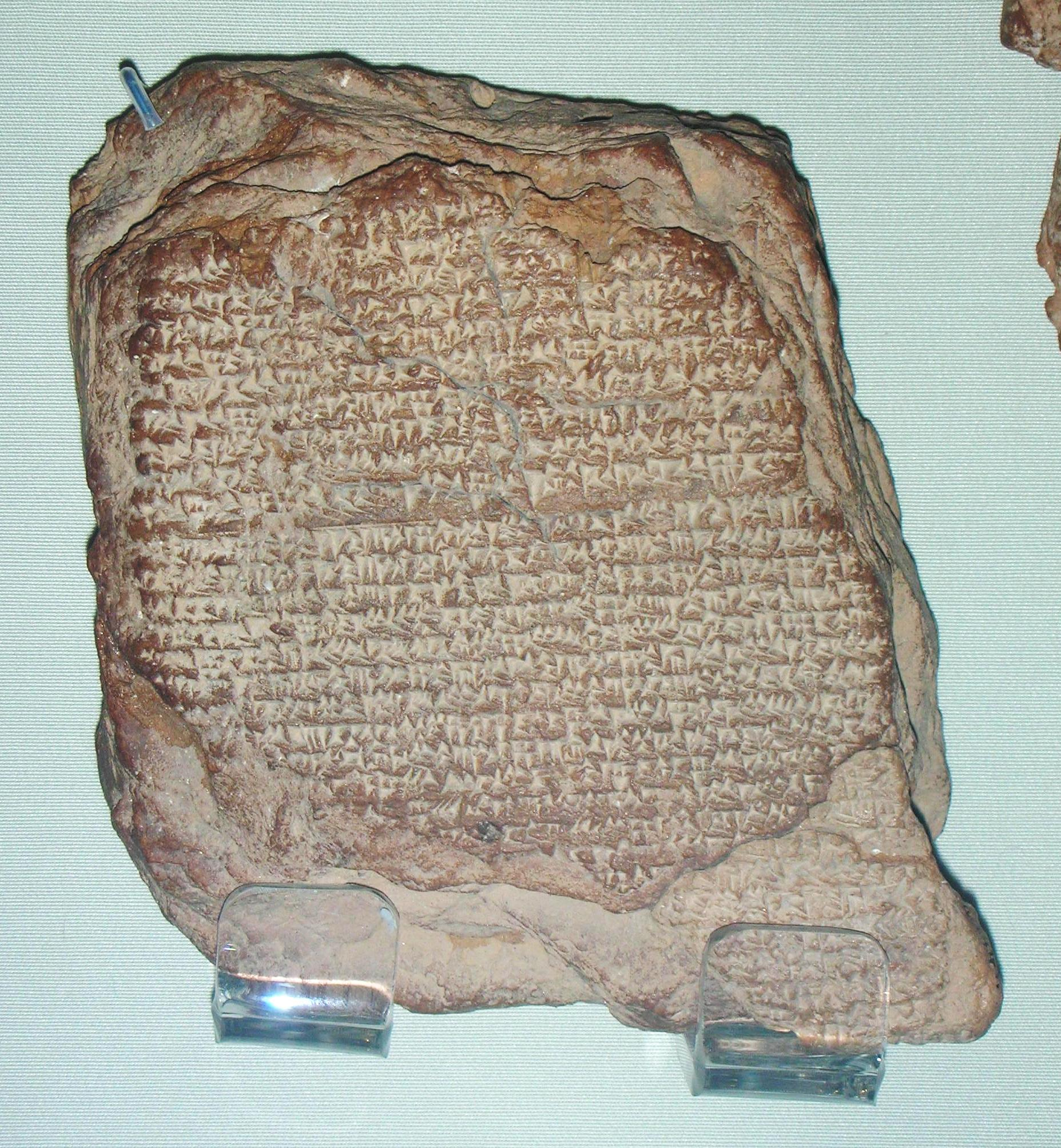
Observation of Halley's Comet, recorded in cuneiform on a clay tablet between 22 and 28 September 164 BCE, Babylon, Iraq. British Museum.

Hunger translated a cuneiform tablet from the Babylonian astronomical diaries that describes the appearance of Halley's Comet in 163 BCE.

== Published works ==
- Hunger, Hermann; Stephenson, F. Richard; Walker, C. B. F.; British Museum (1985). Halley's comet in history. London: Published for the Trustees of the British Museum by British Museum Publications. OCLC 15426334.
- ———————; Sachs, Abraham (1988). Astronomical diaries and related texts from Babylonia Vol. 1 Diaries from 652 B.C. to 262 B.C. [Texts]. Österreichische Akademie der Wissenschaften; Philosophisch-Historische Klasse; Denkschriften. Wien Verl. der Österr. Akad. der Wiss. OCLC 832954401.
- ———————; Pingree, David Edwin (1999). Astral sciences in Mesopotamia. Handbook of Oriental Studies / 1, Sect. 1, Der Nahe und der Mittlere Osten. Vol. 44. Leiden, Boston, Köln: Brill. ISBN 90-04-10127-6. OCLC 260090632.
- ———————; Sachs, Abraham (2014). Astronomical diaries and related texts from Babylonia. Denkschriften (Österreichische Akademie der Wissenschaften. Philosophisch-Historische Klasse), 195., 210., 247., 299., 346., 466. Bd. Wien: Verlag der Österreichischen Akademie der Wissenschaften. OCLC 37770918.
- ———————; Steele, John (2018). The Babylonian Astronomical Compendium MUL.APIN. Scientific Writings from the Ancient and Medieval World. Routledge. p. 2. ISBN 9781351686815.

== Book reviews ==
- De Meis, Salvo (2007). "An Astronomical Analysis of the Occultations Published by Hermann Hunger". Wiener Zeitschrift für die Kunde des Morgenlandes. Festschrift für Hermann Hunger zum 65. Geburtstag gewidmet von seinen Freunden, Kollegen und Schülern (2007). 97. Department of Oriental Studies, University of Vienna: 121–136. JSTOR 23861411.
