= Franz Kugler =

Franz Kugler is the name of:

- Franz Theodor Kugler (1808–1858), German art historian and poet
- Franz Xaver Kugler (1862–1929), professor of mathematics, chemist, assyriologist, and Jesuit priest
- Franz Xaver Kugler (Radler) from Munich who invented a beer shandy drink called Radler
