= 1625 The NORC =

Large main-belt asteroid

Discovery
- Discovered by: S. Arend
- Discovery site: Uccle Obs.
- Discovery date: 1 September 1953

Designations
- Named after: The IBM NORC (Naval Ordnance Research Calculator)
- Alternative designations: 1953 RB · 1929 CA; 1935 EN · 1936 QS; 1942 RK · 1947 NG; 1953 QK · 1954 UL_{1} A914 SA
- Minor planet category: main-belt · (outer)

Orbital characteristics
- Epoch 4 September 2017 (JD 2458000.5)
- Uncertainty parameter 0
- Observation arc: 102.34 yr (37,380 days)
- Aphelion: 3.9236 AU
- Perihelion: 2.4606 AU
- Semi-major axis: 3.1921 AU
- Eccentricity: 0.2292
- Orbital period (sidereal): 5.70 yr (2,083 days)
- Mean anomaly: 147.86°
- Mean motion: 0° 10^{m} 22.08^{s} / day
- Inclination: 15.552°
- Longitude of ascending node: 320.78°
- Argument of perihelion: 286.20°

Physical characteristics
- Dimensions: 44.66±2.09 km 47.60 km (calculated); 53.317±0.176 km 55.863±1.536 km 61.76±17.49 km 75.11±0.80 km
- Synodic rotation period: 12.94±0.01 h 13.8113±0.0071 h 13.959±0.004 h 18.820±0.770 h
- Geometric albedo: 0.023±0.004; 0.03±0.02; 0.0414±0.0077; 0.057 (assumed); 0.065±0.006
- Spectral type: Tholen = C · C B–V = 0.732; U–B = 0.311
- Absolute magnitude (H): 10.043±0.001 (R) · 10.070±0.080 (R) · 10.34

1625 The NORC (provisional designation 1953 RB) is a carbonaceous asteroid from the outer region of the asteroid belt, approximately 55 kilometers in diameter. It was discovered on 1 September 1953, by Belgian astronomer Sylvain Arend at the Royal Observatory of Belgium in Uccle, Belgium. It was named after the IBM Naval Ordnance Research Calculator (NORC).

== Orbit and classification ==
The NORC orbits the Sun in the outer main-belt at a distance of 2.5–3.9 AU once every 5 years and 8 months (2,083 days). Its orbit has an eccentricity of 0.23 and an inclination of 16° with respect to the ecliptic. The asteroid was first identified as A914 SA at Heidelberg Observatory in 1914. Its observation arc begins 24 years prior to its official discovery observation, when it was identified as 1929 CA at Uccle.

== Physical characteristics ==
In the Tholen classification, The NORC is a common carbonaceous C-type asteroid.

=== Lightcurves ===
Between 2009 and 2014, five rotational light-curve were obtained of The NORC from photometric observations taken by René Roy, David Higgins and the Palomar Transient Factory. The light-curves gave a rotation period between 12.94 and 18.820 hours with a change in brightness of 0.06 to 0.33 in magnitude (U=+1/2/3-). The best rated result with a period of 13.959 hours (Δmag 0.16) was obtained by Australian amateur astronomer David Higgins.

=== Diameter and albedo ===
According to the surveys carried out by Japanese Akari satellite and NASA's Wide-field Infrared Survey Explorer with its subsequent NEOWISE mission, The NORC measures between 44.66 and 75.11 kilometers in diameter, and its surface has an albedo of 0.023 and 0.065. The Collaborative Asteroid Lightcurve Link assumes a standard albedo for carbonaceous asteroids of 0.057 and calculates a diameter of 47.60 kilometers using an absolute magnitude of 10.34.

== Naming ==
This minor planet was named after the IBM Naval Ordnance Research Calculator (NORC), IBM's first-generation vacuum tube computer built in the 1950s (also see List of vacuum tube computers and § External links). NORC was the fastest, most powerful electronic computer of its time. Under the direction of Wallace J. Eckert, after whom the asteroid 1750 Eckert is named, NORC performed a vast amount of orbital calculations for minor planet. The official naming citation was published by the Minor Planet Center in May 1957 (M.P.C. 1591).
