= Lunar theory =

Theoretical description of motion of Earth's moon

Lunar theory attempts to account for the motions of the Moon. There are many small variations (or perturbations) in the Moon's motion, and many attempts have been made to account for them. After centuries of being problematic, lunar motion can now be modeled to a very high degree of accuracy (see section Modern developments).

Lunar theory includes:

- the background of general theory; including mathematical techniques used to analyze the Moon's motion and to generate formulae and algorithms for predicting its movements; and also
- quantitative formulae, algorithms, and geometrical diagrams that may be used to compute the Moon's position for a given time; often by the help of tables based on the algorithms.

Lunar theory has a history of over 2000 years of investigation. Its more modern developments have been used over the last three centuries for fundamental scientific and technological purposes, and are still being used in that way.

== Applications ==
Applications of lunar theory have included the following:

- In the eighteenth century, comparison between lunar theory and observation was used to test Newton's law of universal gravitation by the motion of the lunar apogee.
- In the eighteenth and nineteenth centuries, navigational tables based on lunar theory, initially in the Nautical Almanac, were much used for the determination of longitude at sea by the method of lunar distances.
- In the very early twentieth century, comparison between lunar theory and observation was used in another test of gravitational theory, to test (and rule out) Simon Newcomb's suggestion that a well-known discrepancy in the motion of the perihelion of Mercury might be explained by a fractional adjustment of the power -2 in Newton's inverse square law of gravitation (the discrepancy was later successfully explained by the general theory of relativity).
- In the mid-twentieth century, before the development of atomic clocks, lunar theory and observation were used in combination to implement an astronomical time scale (ephemeris time) free of the irregularities of mean solar time.
- In the late twentieth and early twenty-first centuries, modern developments of lunar theory are being used in the Jet Propulsion Laboratory Development Ephemeris series of models of the Solar System, in conjunction with high-precision observations, to test the exactness of physical relationships associated with the general theory of relativity, including the strong equivalence principle, relativistic gravitation, geodetic precession, and the constancy of the gravitational constant.

== History ==
The Moon has been observed for millennia. Over these ages, various levels of care and precision have been possible, according to the techniques of observation available at any time. There is a correspondingly long history of lunar theories: it stretches from the times of the Babylonian and Greek astronomers, down to modern lunar laser ranging.

The history can be considered to fall into three parts: from ancient times to Newton; the period of classical (Newtonian) physics; and modern developments.

=== Babylon ===
Of Babylonian astronomy, practically nothing was known to historians of science before the 1880s. Surviving ancient writings of Pliny had made bare mention of three astronomical schools in Mesopotamia – at Babylon, Uruk, and 'Hipparenum' (possibly 'Sippar'). But definite modern knowledge of any details only began when Joseph Epping deciphered cuneiform texts on clay tablets from a Babylonian archive: In these texts he identified an ephemeris of positions of the Moon. Since then, knowledge of the subject, still fragmentary, has had to be built up by painstaking analysis of deciphered texts, mainly in numerical form, on tablets from Babylon and Uruk (no trace has yet been found of anything from the third school mentioned by Pliny).

To the Babylonian astronomer Kidinnu (in Greek or Latin, Kidenas or Cidenas) has been attributed the invention (5th or 4th century BC) of what is now called "System B" for predicting the position of the moon, taking account that the moon continually changes its speed along its path relative to the background of fixed stars. This system involved calculating daily stepwise changes of lunar speed, up or down, with a minimum and a maximum approximately each month. The basis of these systems appears to have been arithmetical rather than geometrical, but they did approximately account for the main lunar inequality now known as the equation of the center.

The Babylonians kept very accurate records for hundreds of years of new moons and eclipses. Some time between the years 500 BC and 400 BC they identified and began to use the 19 year cyclic relation between lunar months and solar years now known as the Metonic cycle.

This helped them build a numerical theory of the main irregularities in the Moon's motion, reaching remarkably good estimates for the (different) periods of the three most prominent features of the Moon's motion:

- The synodic month, i.e. the mean period for the phases of the Moon. Now called "System B", it reckons the synodic month as 29 days and (sexagesimally) 3,11;0,50 "time degrees", where each time degree is one degree of the apparent motion of the stars, or 4 minutes of time, and the sexagesimal values after the semicolon are fractions of a time degree. This converts to 29.530594 days = 29^{d} 12^{h} 44^{m} 3.33^{s}, to compare with a modern value (as at 1900 Jan 0) of 29.530589 days, or 29^{d} 12^{h} 44^{m} 2.9^{s}. This same value was used by Hipparchos and Ptolemy, was used throughout the Middle Ages, and still forms the basis of the Hebrew calendar.
- The mean lunar velocity relative to the stars they estimated at 13° 10′ 35″ per day, giving a corresponding month of 27.321598 days, to compare with modern values of 13° 10′ 35.0275″ and 27.321582 days.
- The anomalistic month, i.e. the mean period for the Moon's approximately monthly accelerations and decelerations in its rate of movement against the stars, had a Babylonian estimate of 27.5545833 days, to compare with a modern value 27.554551 days.
- The draconitic month, i.e. the mean period with which the path of the Moon against the stars deviates first north and then south in ecliptic latitude by comparison with the ecliptic path of the Sun, was indicated by a number of different parameters leading to various estimates, e.g. of 27.212204 days, to compare with a modern value of 27.212221, but the Babylonians also had a numerical relationship that 5458 synodic months were equal to 5923 draconitic months, which when compared with their accurate value for the synodic month leads to practically exactly the modern figure for the draconitic month.

The Babylonian estimate for the synodic month was adopted for the greater part of two millennia by Hipparchus, Ptolemy, and medieval writers (and it is still in use as part of the basis for the calculated Hebrew (Jewish) calendar).

=== Greece and Hellenistic Egypt ===
Thereafter, from Hipparchus and Ptolemy in the Bithynian and Ptolemaic epochs down to the time of Newton's work in the seventeenth century, lunar theories were composed mainly with the help of geometrical ideas, inspired more or less directly by long series of positional observations of the moon. Prominent in these geometrical lunar theories were combinations of circular motions – applications of the theory of epicycles.

==== Hipparchus ====
Hipparchus, whose works are mostly lost and known mainly from quotations by other authors, assumed that the Moon moved in a circle inclined at 5° to the ecliptic, rotating in a retrograde direction (i.e. opposite to the direction of annual and monthly apparent movements of the Sun and Moon relative to the fixed stars) once in 18 2/3 years. The circle acted as a deferent, carrying an epicycle along which the Moon was assumed to move in a retrograde direction. The center of the epicycle moved at a rate corresponding to the mean change in Moon's longitude, while the period of the Moon around the epicycle was an anomalistic month. This epicycle approximately provided for what was later recognized as the elliptical inequality, the equation of the center, and its size approximated to an equation of the center of about 5° 1'. This figure is much smaller than the modern value: but it is close to the difference between the modern coefficients of the equation of the center (1st term) and that of the evection: the difference is accounted for by the fact that the ancient measurements were taken at times of eclipses, and the effect of the evection (which subtracts under those conditions from the equation of the center) was at that time unknown and overlooked. For further information see also separate article Evection.

==== Ptolemy ====
Ptolemy's work the Almagest had wide and long-lasting acceptance and influence for over a millennium. He gave a geometrical lunar theory that improved on that of Hipparchus by providing for a second inequality of the Moon's motion, using a device that made the apparent apogee oscillate a little – prosneusis of the epicycle. This second inequality or second anomaly accounted rather approximately, not only for the equation of the center, but also for what became known (much later) as the evection. But this theory, applied to its logical conclusion, would make the distance (and apparent diameter) of the Moon appear to vary by a factor of about 2, which is clearly not seen in reality. (The apparent angular diameter of the Moon does vary monthly, but only over a much narrower range of about 0.49°–0.55°.) This defect of the Ptolemaic theory led to proposed replacements by Ibn al-Shatir in the 14th century and by Copernicus in the 16th century.

=== Ibn al-Shatir and Copernicus ===
Significant advances in lunar theory were made by the Arab astronomer, Ibn al-Shatir (1304–1375). Drawing on the observation that the distance to the Moon did not change as drastically as required by Ptolemy's lunar model, he produced a new lunar model that replaced Ptolemy's crank mechanism with a double epicycle model that reduced the computed range of distances of the Moon from the Earth. A similar lunar theory, developed some 150 years later by the Renaissance astronomer Nicolaus Copernicus, had the same advantage concerning the lunar distances.

=== Tycho Brahe, Johannes Kepler, and Jeremiah Horrocks ===
Tycho Brahe and Johannes Kepler refined the Ptolemaic lunar theory, but did not overcome its central defect of giving a poor account of the (mainly monthly) variations in the Moon's distance, apparent diameter and parallax. Their work added to the lunar theory three substantial further discoveries.

1. The nodes and the inclination of the lunar orbital plane both appear to librate, with a monthly (according to Tycho) or semi-annual period (according to Kepler).
2. The lunar longitude has a twice-monthly Variation, by which the Moon moves faster than expected at new and full moon, and slower than expected at the quarters.
3. There is also an annual effect, by which the lunar motion slows down a little in January and speeds up a little in July: the annual equation.

The refinements of Brahe and Kepler were recognized by their immediate successors as improvements, but their seventeenth-century successors tried numerous alternative geometrical configurations for the lunar motions to improve matters further. A notable success was achieved by Jeremiah Horrocks, who proposed a scheme involving an approximate 6 monthly libration in the position of the lunar apogee and also in the size of the elliptical eccentricity. This scheme had the great merit of giving a more realistic description of the changes in distance, diameter and parallax of the Moon.

=== Newton ===
A first gravitational period for lunar theory started with the work of Newton. He was the first to define the problem of the perturbed motion of the Moon in recognisably modern terms. His groundbreaking work is shown for example in the Principia in all versions including the first edition published in 1687.

Newton's biographer, David Brewster, reported that the complexity of Lunar Theory impacted Newton's health: "[H]e was deprived of his appetite and sleep" during his work on the problem in 1692–3, and told the astronomer John Machin that "his head never ached but when he was studying the subject". According to Brewster, Edmund Halley also told John Conduitt that when pressed to complete his analysis Newton "always replied that it made his head ache, and kept him awake so often, that he would think of it no more" [Emphasis in original].

==== Solar perturbation of lunar motion ====
Newton identified how to evaluate the perturbing effect on the relative motion of the Earth and Moon, arising from their gravity towards the Sun, in Book 1, Proposition 66, and in Book 3, Proposition 25. The starting-point for this approach is Corollary VI to the laws of motion. This shows that if the external accelerative forces from some massive body happens to act equally and in parallel on some different other bodies considered, then those bodies would be affected equally, and in that case their motions (relative to each other) would continue as if there were no such external accelerative forces at all. It is only in the case that the external forces (e.g. in Book 1, Prop. 66, and Book 3, Prop. 25, the gravitational attractions towards the Sun) are different in size or in direction in their accelerative effects on the different bodies considered (e.g. on the Earth and Moon), that consequent effects are appreciable on the relative motions of the latter bodies. (Newton referred to accelerative forces or accelerative gravity due to some external massive attractor such as the Sun. The measure he used was the acceleration that the force tends to produce (in modern terms, force per unit mass), rather than what we would now call the force itself.)

Thus Newton concluded that it is only the difference between the Sun's accelerative attraction on the Moon and the Sun's attraction on the Earth that perturbs the motion of the Moon relative to the Earth.

Newton then in effect used vector decomposition of forces, to carry out this analysis. In Book 1, Proposition 66 and in Book 3, Proposition 25, he showed by a geometrical construction, starting from the total gravitational attraction of the Sun on the Earth, and of the Sun on the Moon, the difference that represents the perturbing effect on the motion of the Moon relative to the Earth. In summary, line LS in Newton's diagram as shown below represents the size and direction of the perturbing acceleration acting on the Moon in the Moon's current position P (line LS does not pass through point P, but the text shows that this is not intended to be significant, it is a result of the scale factors and the way the diagram has been built up).

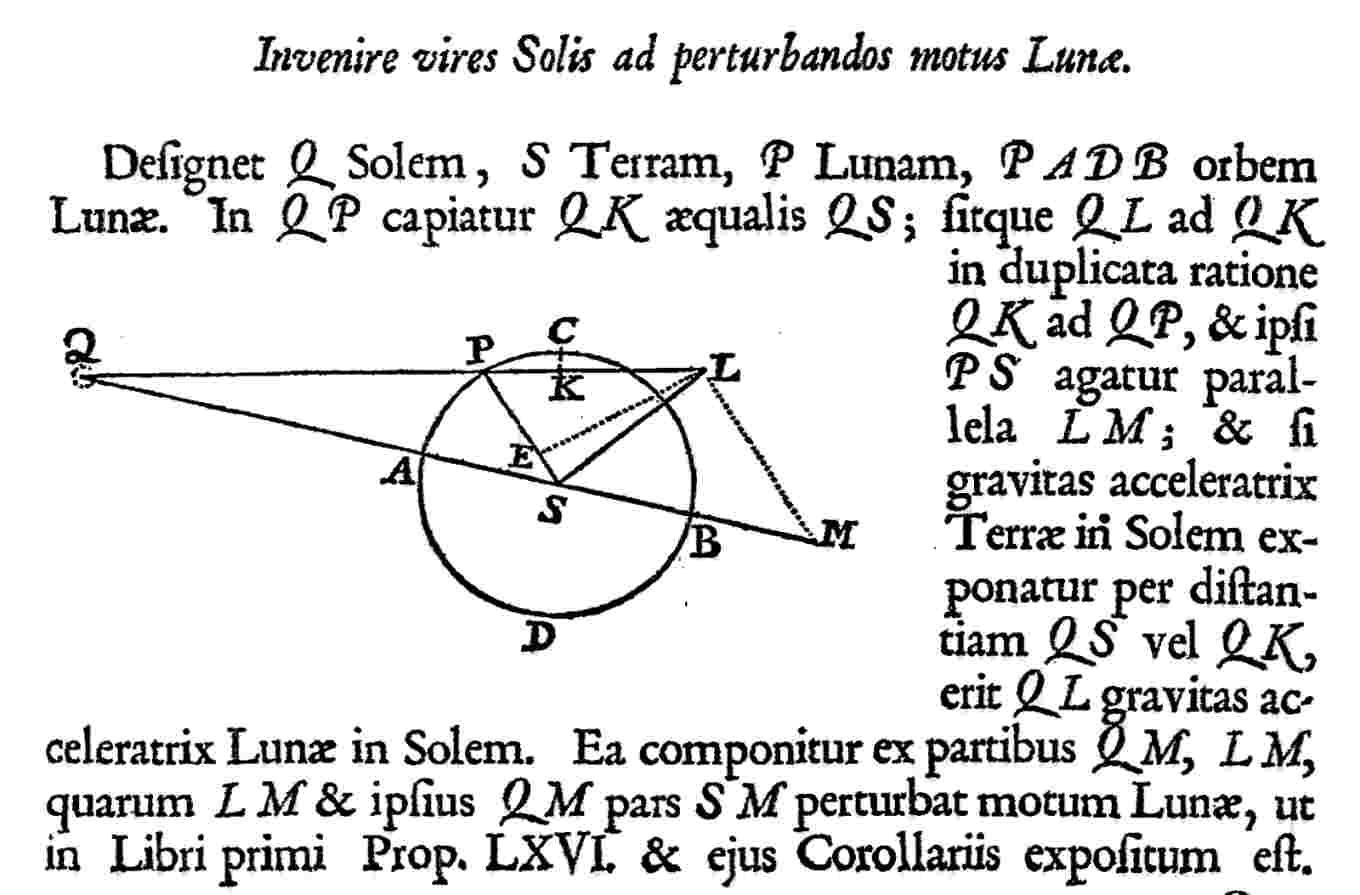
Newton's diagram 'to find the force of the Sun to perturb the Moon' accompanying Book 3, Proposition 25 of the Principia

Shown here is Newton's diagram from the first (1687) Latin edition of the Principia (Book 3, Proposition 25, p. 434). Here he introduced his analysis of perturbing accelerations on the Moon in the Sun-Earth-Moon system. Q represents the Sun, S the Earth, and P the Moon.

Parts of this diagram represent distances, other parts gravitational accelerations (attractive forces per unit mass). In a dual significance, SQ represents the Earth-Sun distance, and then it also represents the size and direction of the Earth-Sun gravitational acceleration. Other distances in the diagram are then in proportion to distance SQ. Other attractions are in proportion to attraction SQ.

The Sun's attractions are SQ (on the Earth) and LQ (on the Moon). The size of LQ is drawn so that the ratio of attractions LQ:SQ is the inverse square of the ratio of distances PQ:SQ. (Newton constructs KQ=SQ, giving an easier view of the proportions.) The Earth's attraction on the Moon acts along direction PS. (But line PS signifies only distance and direction so far, nothing has been defined about the scale factor between solar and terrestrial attractions).

After showing solar attractions LQ on the Moon and SQ on the Earth, on the same scale, Newton then makes a vector decomposition of LQ into components LM and MQ. Then he identifies the perturbing acceleration on the Moon as the difference of this from SQ. SQ and MQ are parallel to each other, so SQ can be directly subtracted from MQ, leaving MS. The resulting difference, after subtracting SQ from LQ, is therefore the vector sum of LM and MS: these add up to a perturbing acceleration LS.

Later Newton identified another resolution of the perturbing acceleration LM+MS = LS, into orthogonal components: a transverse component parallel to LE, and a radial component, effectively ES.

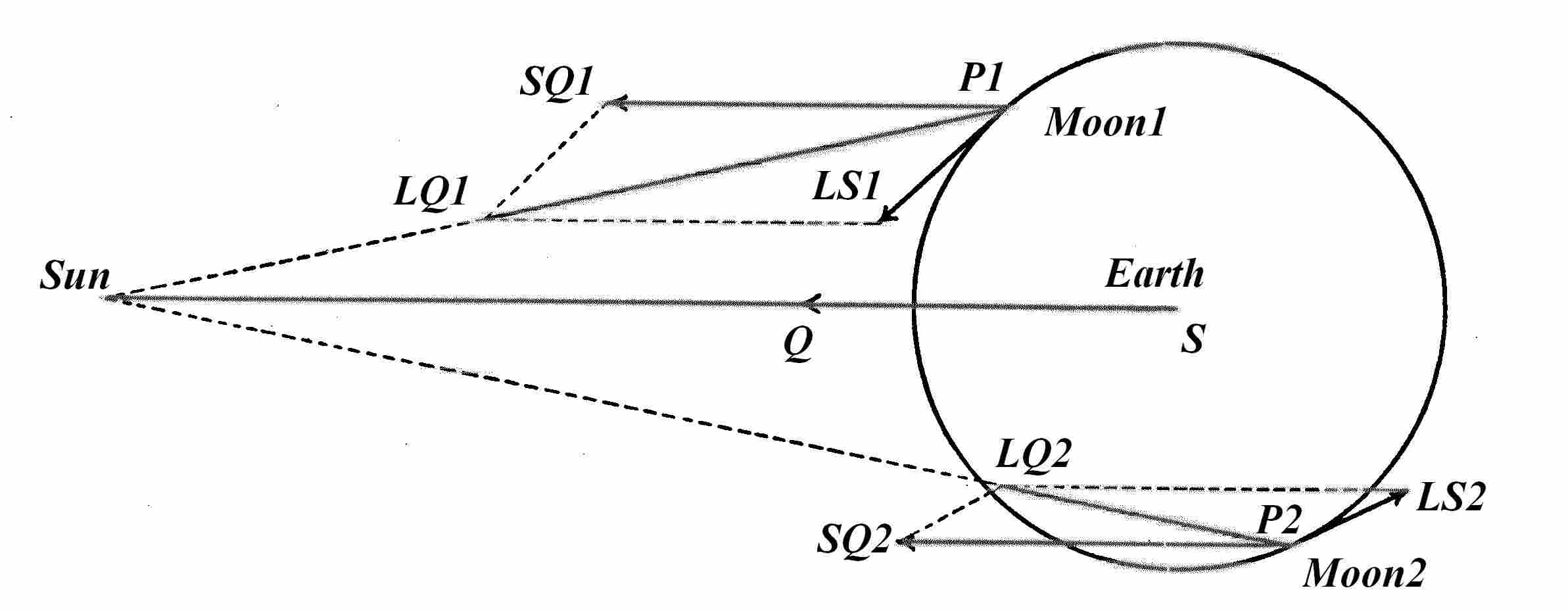
Alternative depiction of solar perturbations, vectors LS1 and LS2, like LS in Newton's diagram above, for 2 positions of the Moon P in its orbit around the Earth S

Newton's diagrammatic scheme, since his time, has been represented in other and perhaps visually clearer ways. Shown here is a vector presentation indicating, for two different positions, P1 and P2, of the Moon in its orbit around the Earth, the respective vectors LS1 and LS2 for the perturbing acceleration due to the Sun. The Moon's position at P1 is fairly close to what it was at P in Newton's diagram; corresponding perturbation LS1 is like Newton's LS in size and direction. At another position P2, the Moon is farther away from the Sun than the Earth is, the Sun's attraction LQ2 on the Moon is weaker than the Sun's attraction SQ=SQ2 on the Earth, and then the resulting perturbation LS2 points obliquely away from the Sun.

Solar perturbation vectors (arrows) analogous to LS at many positions of the Moon in its orbit around the Earth

Constructions like those in Newton's diagram can be repeated for many different positions of the Moon in its orbit. For each position, the result is a perturbation vector like LS1 or LS2 in the second diagram. Shown here is an often-presented form of the diagram that summarises sizes and directions of the perturbation vectors for many different positions of the Moon in its orbit. Each small arrow is a perturbation vector like LS, applicable to the Moon in the particular position around the orbit from which the arrow begins. The perturbations on the Moon when it is nearly in line along the Earth-Sun axis, i.e. near new or full moon, point outwards, away from the Earth. When the Moon-Earth line is 90° from the Earth-Sun axis they point inwards, towards the Earth, with a size that is only half the maximum size of the axial (outwards) perturbations. (Newton gave a rather good quantitative estimate for the size of the solar perturbing force: at quadrature where it adds to the Earth's attraction he put it at 1/178.725 of the mean terrestrial attraction, and twice as much as that at the new and full moons where it opposes and diminishes the Earth's attraction.)

Newton also showed that the same pattern of perturbation applies, not only to the Moon, in its relation to the Earth as disturbed by the Sun, but also to other particles more generally in their relation to the solid Earth as disturbed by the Sun (or by the Moon); for example different portions of the tidal waters at the Earth's surface. (Note: The overall tide-generating force on the Earth's tidal waters results from the superposition of two of these similar patterns, one of them due to the Sun, the other due to the Moon as external perturbing body. The superposition varies in its overall effect depending on the angular relation of Sun and Moon at the considered time.) The study of the common pattern of these perturbing accelerations grew out of Newton's initial study of the perturbations of the Moon, which he also applied to the forces moving tidal waters. Nowadays this common pattern itself has become often known as a tidal force whether it is being applied to the disturbances of the motions of the Moon, or of the Earth's tidal waters – or of the motions of any other object that suffers perturbations of analogous pattern.

After introducing his diagram 'to find the force of the Sun to perturb the Moon' in Book 3, Proposition 25, Newton developed a first approximation to the solar perturbing force, showing in further detail how its components vary as the Moon follows its monthly path around the Earth. He also took the first steps in investigating how the perturbing force shows its effects by producing irregularities in the lunar motions. (Note: In this part of the enterprise, Newton's success was more limited: it is relatively uncomplicated to define the perturbing forces, but heavy complexities soon arise in the problem of working out the resulting motions, and these were to challenge mathematical astronomers for two centuries after Newton's initial definition of the problem and indication of the directions to take in solving it.)

For a selected few of the lunar inequalities, Newton showed in some quantitative detail how they arise from the solar perturbing force.

Much of this lunar work of Newton's was done in the 1680s, and the extent and accuracy of his first steps in the gravitational analysis was limited by several factors, including his own choice to develop and present the work in what was, on the whole, a difficult geometrical way, and by the limited accuracy and uncertainty of many astronomical measurements in his time.

== Classical gravitational period after Newton ==
The main aim of Newton's successors, from Leonhard Euler, Alexis Clairaut and Jean d'Alembert in the mid-eighteenth century, down to Ernest William Brown in the late nineteenth and early twentieth century, was to account completely and much more precisely for the moon's motions on the basis of Newton's laws, i.e. the laws of motion and of universal gravitation by attractions inversely proportional to the squares of the distances between the attracting bodies. They also wished to put the inverse-square law of gravitation to the test, and for a time in the 1740s it was seriously doubted, on account of what was then thought to be a large discrepancy between the Newton-theoretical and the observed rates in the motion of the lunar apogee. However Clairaut showed shortly afterwards (1749–50) that at least the major cause of the discrepancy lay not in the lunar theory based on Newton's laws, but in excessive approximations that he and others had relied on to evaluate it.

Most of the improvements in theory after Newton were made in algebraic form: they involved voluminous and highly laborious amounts of infinitesimal calculus and trigonometry. It also remained necessary, for completing the theories of this period, to refer to observational measurements.

=== Results of the theories ===
The lunar theorists used (and invented) many different mathematical approaches to analyse the gravitational problem. Not surprisingly, their results tended to converge. From the time of the earliest gravitational analysts among Newton's successors, Euler, Clairaut and d'Alembert, it was recognized that nearly all of the main lunar perturbations could be expressed in terms of just a few angular arguments and coefficients. These can be represented by:

- the mean motions or positions of the Moon and the Sun, together with three coefficients and three angular positions, which together define the shape and location of their apparent orbits:
- the two eccentricities ($e$, about 0.0549, and $e'$, about 0.01675) of the ellipses that approximate to the apparent orbits of the Moon and the Sun;
- the angular direction of the perigees ($\Gamma$ and $\Gamma'$) (or their opposite points the apogees) of the two orbits; and
- the angle of inclination ($i$, mean value about 18523") between the planes of the two orbits, together with the direction ($\Omega$) of the line of nodes in which those two planes intersect. The ascending node ($\Omega$) is the node passed by the Moon when it is tending northwards relative to the ecliptic.

From these basic parameters, just four basic differential angular arguments are enough to express, in their different combinations, nearly all of the most significant perturbations of the lunar motions. They are given here with their conventional symbols due to Delaunay; they are sometimes known as the Delaunay arguments:

- $l$ the Moon's mean anomaly (angular distance of the mean longitude of the Moon from the mean longitude of its perigee $\Gamma$);
- $l'$ the Sun's mean anomaly (angular distance of the mean longitude of the Sun from the mean longitude of its perigee $\Gamma'$);
- $F$ the Moon's mean argument of latitude (angular distance of the mean longitude of the Moon from the mean longitude of its ascending (northward-bound) node $\Omega$);
- $D$ the Moon's mean (solar) elongation (angular distance of the mean longitude of the Moon from the mean longitude of the Sun).

This work culminated into Brown's lunar theory (1897–1908) and Tables of the Motion of the Moon (1919). These were used in the American Ephemeris and Nautical Almanac until 1968, and in a modified form until 1984.

=== Largest or named lunar inequalities ===
Several of the largest lunar perturbations in longitude (contributions to the difference in its true ecliptic longitude relative to its mean longitude) have been named. In terms of the differential arguments, they can be expressed in the following way, with coefficients rounded to the nearest second of arc ("):

==== Equation of the center ====
- The Moon's equation of the center, or elliptic inequality, was known at least in approximation, to the ancients from the Babylonians and Hipparchus onwards. Knowledge of more recent date is that it corresponds to the approximate application of Kepler's law of equal areas in an elliptical orbit, and represents the speeding-up of the Moon as its distance from the Earth decreases while it moves towards its perigee, and then its slowing down as its distance from the Earth increases while it moves towards its apogee. The effect on the Moon's longitude can be approximated by a series of terms, of which the first three are $+22639''\sin(l) +769''\sin(2l) +36''\sin(3l)$.

==== Evection ====
- The evection (or its approximation) was known to Ptolemy, but its name and knowledge of its cause dates from the 17th century. Its effect on the Moon's longitude has an odd-appearing period of about 31.8 days. This can be represented in a number of ways, for example as the result of an approximate 6-monthly libration in the position of perigee, with an accompanying 6-monthly pulsation in the size of the Moon's orbital eccentricity. Its principal term is $+4586''\sin(2D-l)$.

==== Variation ====
- The Variation, discovered by Tycho Brahe, is a speeding-up of the Moon as it approaches new-moon and full-moon, and a slowing-down as it approaches first and last quarter. Its gravitational explanation with a quantitative estimate was first given by Newton. Its principal term is $+2370''\sin(2D)$.

==== Annual equation ====
- The annual equation, also discovered by Brahe, was qualitatively explained by Newton in terms that the Moon's orbit becomes slightly expanded in size, and longer in period, when the Earth is at perihelion closest to the Sun at the beginning of January, and the Sun's perturbing effect is strongest, and then slightly contracted in size and shorter in period when the Sun is most distant in early July, so that its perturbing effect is weaker: the modern value for the principal term due to this effect is $-668''\sin(l')$.

==== Parallactic inequality ====
- The parallactic inequality, first found by Newton, makes Brahe's Variation a little asymmetric as a result of the finite distance and non-zero parallax of the Sun. Its effect is that the Moon is a little behind at first quarter, and a little ahead at last quarter. Its principal term is $-125''\sin(D)$.

==== Reduction to the ecliptic ====
- The reduction to the ecliptic represents the geometric effect of expressing the Moon's motion in terms of a longitude in the plane of the ecliptic, although its motion is really taking place in a plane that is inclined by about 5 degrees. Its principal term is $-412''\sin(2F)$.

The analysts of the mid-18th century expressed the perturbations of the Moon's position in longitude using about 25-30 trigonometrical terms. However, work in the nineteenth and twentieth century led to very different formulations of the theory so these terms are no longer current. The number of terms needed to express the Moon's position with the accuracy sought at the beginning of the twentieth century was over 1400; and the number of terms needed to emulate the accuracy of modern numerical integrations based on laser-ranging observations is in the tens of thousands: there is no limit to the increase in number of terms needed as requirements of accuracy increase.

== Modern developments ==
=== Digital computers and lunar laser ranging ===
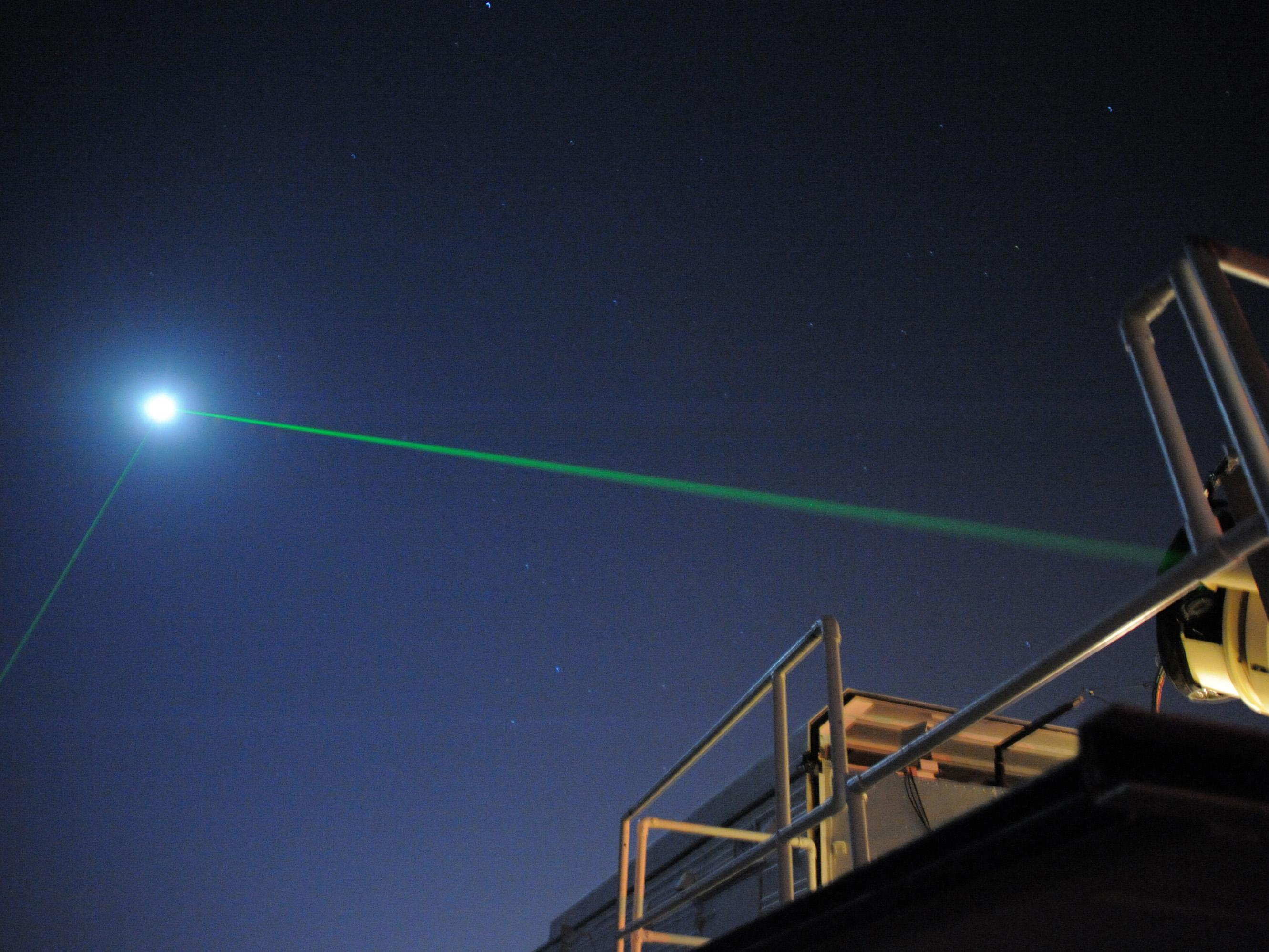
The Laser Ranging Facility at Goddard Spaceflight Center

Since the Second World War and especially since the 1960s, lunar theory has been further developed in a somewhat different way. This has been stimulated in two ways: on the one hand, by the use of automatic digital computation, and on the other hand, by modern observational data-types, with greatly increased accuracy and precision.

Wallace John Eckert, a student of Ernest William Brown and employee at IBM, used the experimental digital computers developed there after the Second World War for computation of astronomical ephemerides. One of the projects was to put Brown's lunar theory into the machine and evaluate the expressions directly. Another project was something entirely new: a numerical integration of the equations of motion for the Sun and the four major planets. This became feasible only after electronic digital computers became available. Eventually this led to the Jet Propulsion Laboratory Development Ephemeris series.

In the meantime, Brown's theory was improved with better constants and the introduction of Ephemeris Time and the removal of some empirical corrections associated with this. This led to the Improved Lunar Ephemeris (ILE), which, with some minor successive improvements, was used in the astronomical almanacs from 1960 through 1983 (Note: ILE j=0 from 1960 to 1967, ILE j=1 from 1968 to 1971, ILE j=2 from 1972 to 1983.) and enabled lunar landing missions.

The most significant improvement of position observations of the Moon have been the Lunar Laser Ranging measurements, obtained using Earth-bound lasers and special retroreflectors placed on the surface of the Moon. The time-of-flight of a pulse of laser light to one of the retroreflectors and back gives a measure of the Moon's distance at that time. The first of five retroreflectors that are operational today was taken to the Moon in the Apollo 11 spacecraft in July 1969 and placed in a suitable position on the Moon's surface by Buzz Aldrin. Range precision has been extended further by the Apache Point Observatory Lunar Laser-ranging Operation, established in 2005.

=== Numerical integrations, relativity, tides, librations ===
The lunar theory, as developed numerically to fine precision using these modern measures, is based on a larger range of considerations than the classical theories: It takes account not only of gravitational forces (with relativistic corrections) but also of many tidal and geophysical effects and a greatly extended theory of lunar libration. Like many other scientific fields this one has now developed so as to be based on the work of large teams and institutions. An institution notably taking one of the leading parts in these developments has been the Jet Propulsion Laboratory (JPL) at California Institute of Technology; and names particularly associated with the transition, from the early 1970s onwards, from classical lunar theories and ephemerides towards the modern state of the science include those of J. Derral Mulholland and J.G. Williams, and for the linked development of solar system (planetary) ephemerides E. Myles Standish.

Since the 1970s, JPL has produced a series of numerically integrated Development Ephemerides (numbered DExxx), incorporating Lunar Ephemerides (LExxx). Planetary and lunar ephemerides DE200/LE200 were used in the official Astronomical Almanac ephemerides for 1984–2002, and ephemerides DE405/LE405, of further improved accuracy and precision, have been in use as from the issue for 2003. The current ephemeris is DE440.

=== Analytical developments ===
In parallel with these developments, a new class of analytical lunar theory has also been developed in recent years, notably the Ephemeride Lunaire Parisienne by Jean Chapront and Michelle Chapront-Touzé from the Bureau des Longitudes. Using computer-assisted algebra, the analytical developments have been taken further than previously could be done by the classical analysts working manually. Also, some of these new analytical theories (like ELP) have been fitted to the numerical ephemerides previously developed at JPL as mentioned above. The main aims of these recent analytical theories, in contrast to the aims of the classical theories of past centuries, have not been to generate improved positional data for current dates; rather, their aims have included the study of further aspects of the motion, such as long-term properties, which may not so easily be apparent from the modern numerical theories themselves.

== Notable astronomers ==
Among notable astronomers and mathematicians down the ages, whose names are associated with lunar theories, are:

Babylonian/Chaldean

- Naburimannu
- Kidinnu
- Soudines

Ancient Greeks/Hellenistic

- Hipparchus
- Ptolemy

Medieval Islamic world

- Ibn al-Shatir

European Middle Ages

- Sandivogius of Czechel
- Albert Brudzewski
- Nicolaus Copernicus

European, 16th to early 20th centuries

- Tycho Brahe
- Johannes Kepler
- Jeremiah Horrocks
- Ismaël Bullialdus
- John Flamsteed
- Isaac Newton
- Edmond Halley
- Leonhard Euler
- Alexis Clairaut
- Jean d'Alembert
- Tobias Mayer
- Johann Tobias Bürg
- Pierre-Simon Laplace
- Philippe le Doulcet
- Johann Karl Burckhardt
- Peter Andreas Hansen
- Charles-Eugène Delaunay
- John Couch Adams

North American, 19th to early 20th centuries

- Simon Newcomb
- George William Hill
- Ernest William Brown
- Wallace John Eckert

Other notable mathematicians and mathematical astronomers also made significant contributions.

== Bibliography ==
- 'AE 1871': "Nautical Almanac & Astronomical Ephemeris" for 1871, (London, 1867).
- E W Brown (1896). An Introductory Treatise on the Lunar Theory, Cambridge University Press.
- E W Brown. "Theory of the Motion of the Moon", Memoirs of the Royal Astronomical Society, 53 (1897), 39–116.
- E W Brown. "Theory of the Motion of the Moon", Memoirs of the Royal Astronomical Society, 53 (1899), 163–202.
- E W Brown. "Theory of the Motion of the Moon", Memoirs of the Royal Astronomical Society, 54 (1900), 1–63.
- E W Brown. "On the verification of the Newtonian law", Monthly Notes of the Royal Astronomical Society 63 (1903), 396–397.
- E W Brown. "Theory of the Motion of the Moon", Memoirs of the Royal Astronomical Society, 57 (1905), 51–145.
- E W Brown. "Theory of the Motion of the Moon", Memoirs of the Royal Astronomical Society, 59 (1908), 1–103.
- E W Brown (1919). Tables of the Motion of the Moon, New Haven.
- M Chapront-Touzé & J Chapront. "The lunar ephemeris ELP-2000", Astronomy & Astrophysics 124 (1983), 50–62.
- M Chapront-Touzé & J Chapront: "ELP2000-85: a semi-analytical lunar ephemeris adequate for historical times", Astronomy & Astrophysics 190 (1988), 342–352.
- M Chapront-Touzé & J Chapront, Analytical Ephemerides of the Moon in the 20th Century (Observatoire de Paris, 2002).
- J Chapront; M Chapront-Touzé; G Francou. "A new determination of lunar orbital parameters, precession constant and tidal acceleration from LLR measurements", Astronomy & Astrophysics 387 (2002), 700–709.
- J Chapront & G Francou. "The lunar theory ELP revisited. Introduction of new planetary perturbations", Astronomy & Astrophysics 404 (2003), 735–742.
- I B Cohen and Anne Whitman (1999). Isaac Newton: 'The Principia', a new translation, University of California Press. (For bibliographic details but no text, see external link.)
- J O Dickey; P L Bender; J E Faller; and others. "Lunar Laser Ranging: A Continuing Legacy of the Apollo Program", Science 265 (1994), pp. 482–490.
- J L E Dreyer (1906). A History of Astronomy from Thales to Kepler, Cambridge University Press, (later republished under the modified title "History of the Planetary Systems from Thales to Kepler").
- W J Eckert et al. Improved Lunar Ephemeris 1952–1959: A Joint Supplement to the American Ephemeris and the (British) Nautical Almanac, (US Government Printing Office, 1954).
- J Epping & J N Strassmaier. "Zur Entzifferung der astronomischen Tafeln der Chaldaer" ("On the Deciphering of the Astronomical Tables of the Chaldaeans"), Stimmen aus Maria Laach, vol. 21 (1881), pp. 277–292.
- 'ESAE 1961': Explanatory Supplement to the Astronomical Ephemeris and the American Ephemeris and Nautical Almanac ('prepared jointly by the Nautical Almanac Offices of the United Kingdom and the United States of America'), London (HMSO), 1961.
- K Garthwaite; D B Holdridge & J D Mulholland. "A preliminary special perturbation theory for the lunar motion", Astronomical Journal 75 (1970), 1133.
- H Godfray (1885). Elementary Treatise on the Lunar Theory, London, (4th ed.).
- Andrew Motte (1729a) (translator). "The Mathematical Principles of Natural Philosophy, by Sir Isaac Newton, translated into English", Volume I, containing Book 1.
- Andrew Motte (1729b) (translator). "The Mathematical Principles of Natural Philosophy, by Sir Isaac Newton, translated into English", Volume II, containing Books 2 and 3 (with Index, Appendix containing additional (Newtonian) proofs, and "The Laws of the Moon's Motion according to Gravity", by John Machin).
- J D Mulholland & P J Shelus. "Improvement of the numerical lunar ephemeris with laser ranging data", Moon 8 (1973), 532.
- O Neugebauer (1975). A History of Ancient Mathematical Astronomy, (in 3 volumes), New York (Springer).
- X X Newhall; E M Standish; J G Williams. "DE102: A numerically integrated ephemeris of the Moon and planets spanning forty-four centuries", Astronomy and Astrophysics 125 (1983), 150.
- U S Naval Observatory (2009). "History of the Astronomical Almanac".
- J G Williams et al. "Making solutions from lunar laser ranging data", Bulletin of the American Astronomical Society (1972), 4Q, 267.
- J.G. Williams; S.G. Turyshev; & D.H. Boggs. "Progress in Lunar Laser Ranging Tests of Relativistic Gravity", Physical Review Letters, 93 (2004), 261101.
