= Kidinnu =

4th century BC Chaldean astronomer and mathematician

Kidinnu (also Kidunnu; possibly fl. 4th century BC; possibly died 14 August 330 BC) was a Chaldean astronomer and mathematician. Strabo of Amaseia called him Kidenas, Pliny the Elder called him Cidenas, and Vettius Valens called him Kidynas.

Some cuneiform and classical Greek and Latin texts mention an astronomer with this name, but it is not clear if they all refer to the same individual:

- The Greek geographer Strabo of Amaseia, in Geography 16.1.6, writes: "In Babylon a settlement is set apart for the local philosophers, the Chaldeans, as they are called, who are concerned mostly with astronomy; but some of these, who are not approved of by the others, profess to be writers of horoscopes. (There is also a tribe of the Chaldeans, and a territory inhabited by them, in the neighborhood of the Arabs and of the Persian Gulf, as it is called.) There are also several tribes of the Chaldean astronomers. For example, some are called Orcheni [those from Uruk], others Borsippeni [those from Borsippa], and several others by different names, as though divided into different sects which hold to various dogmas about the same subjects. And the mathematicians make mention of some of these men; as, for example, Kidenas, Nabourianos and Soudines".
- The Roman encyclopedist Pliny the Elder, in Natural History II.vi.39, writes that the planet Mercury can be viewed "sometimes before sunrise and sometimes after sunset, but according to Cidenas and Sosigenes never more than 22 degrees away from the sun".
- The Roman astrologer Vettius Valens, in Anthology, says that he used Hipparchus for the Sun, Sudines and Kidynas and Apollonius for the Moon, and again Apollonius for both types (of eclipses, i.e. solar and lunar).
- The Hellenistic astronomer Ptolemy, in Almagest IV 2, discusses the duration and ratios of several periods related to the Moon, as known to "ancient astronomers" and "the Chaldeans" and improved by Hipparchus. He mentions (at H272) the equality of 251 (synodic) months to 269 returns in anomaly. In a preserved classical manuscript of the excerpt known as Handy Tables, an anonymous reader in the third century wrote the comment (a scholium) that Kidenas discovered this relation.
- The colophon of two Babylonian System B lunar ephemerides from Babylon (see ACT 122 for 104–101 BC, and ACT 123a for an unknown year) say that they are the "tersitu" (see below) of Kidinnu.
- A damaged cuneiform astronomical diary tablet from Babylon (Babylonian Chronicle 8: the Alexander Chronicle, BM 36304) mentions that "ki-di-nu was killed by the sword" on day 15 of probably the 5th month of that year, which has been dated as 14 August 330 BC, less than a year after Alexander the Great conquered Babylon.

The following information is an excerpt of the overview of a century of scholarship in the sources referenced below.

The meaning of tersitu is not known definitively. Already Franz Xaver Kugler proposed that the word can be interpreted here as "table"; in another context it seems to mean something like "tool", but in yet another it refers to a blue enamel paste. P. Schnabel, in a series of papers (1923–1927), interpreted the phrase as an assignment of authorship. He argued that Naburimannu developed the Babylonian System A of calculating Solar System ephemerides, and that later Kidinnu developed the Babylonian System B. A Greco-Roman tradition, mentioned above, attributes to Kidinnu the discovery that 251 synodic months equals 269 anomalistic months. This relationship is implicit in System B, and is therefore another reason to believe that Kidinnu was involved in developing the lunar theory of System B. However, the conclusion that Kidinnu is the main creator of System B is uncertain. Babylonian astronomers before Kidinnu's time apparently already knew the Saros cycle (old eclipse observations were collected in tables organised according to the Saros cycle since the late 5th century BC) and the Metonic cycle (the dates of the lunar calendar in the Saros tables follow a regular 19-year pattern of embolismic months at least since 498 BC); both cycles are also used in System B. Schnabel computed specific years (first 314 BC and later 379 BC) for the origin of the System B lunar theory, but Franz Xaver Kugler and Otto E. Neugebauer later disproved Schnabel's calculations. Schnabel also asserted that Kidinnu discovered precession when distinguishing between sidereal and tropical years; Neugebauer contested this and current scholarship considers this conclusion to be unfounded.

The lunation length used in System B has also been attributed to Kidinnu. It is 29 days + 191 time degrees + 1/72 of a time degree ("barley corn") = 29^{d} 31:50:8:20 (sexagesimal) = 29^{d} + 12^{h} + 793/1080^{h} (Hebrew helek) = 29.53059414...^{d}. Being a rounded value in the archaic unit of "barley corns" it may be even more ancient. In any case, it is very accurate, within about ⅓ of a second per month. Hipparchus confirmed this value for the lunation length. Ptolemy accepted and used it, as mentioned above. Hillel II first used it in the Hebrew calendar, and it has been used for that purpose ever since.

The existing evidence makes it difficult to put Kidinnu at a time and place. Schnabel placed Kidinnu in Sippar, but Otto E. Neugebauer showed that Schnabel based this conclusion on a misreading of the cuneiform tablet. Classical sources like Strabo mention different "schools" and "doctrines" followed in different places (Babylon, Borsippa, Sippar, Uruk). System A and B have been used contemporaneously, and tablets for both systems have been found in both Babylon and Uruk. Tablets based on System B, associated with Kidinnu, have been found mostly in Uruk, but the earlier tablets came predominantly from Babylon. The oldest preserved tablet using System B comes from Babylon and dates from 258 to 257 BC. This is in the Seleucid era, but it is plausible that the traditional Chaldean astronomical systems had been developed before the Hellenistic period. The Alexander chronicle mentioned above suggests that the famous astronomer Kidinnu died in Babylon in 330 BC, if it refers to the same Kidinnu who was mentioned on the ephemeris tablets centuries later.

== Legacy ==
- The crater Kidinnu on the Moon is named after him.
