= IBM Electromatic Table Printing Machine =

Typesetting-quality printer for computer output

The IBM Electromatic Table Printing Machine was a typesetting-quality printer, consisting of a modified IBM Electromatic Proportional Spacing Typewriter connected to a modified IBM 016 keypunch. A plugboard control panel was used for programming and formatting of the printout.

A deck of punched cards containing the table (calculated and punched by other unit record equipment) to be printed was put into the IBM 016, which read them and then controlled the typing of the typewriter through a box containing solenoids that depressed the keys. Printed output could then be photographically reproduced on a printing plate, which would be used in a printing press to make as many copies as needed.

== Development ==
Columbia University Astronomy Professor Wallace Eckert was examining the process used by the Navy to produce Air Almanacs. Deciding that the manual computation techniques used were too slow and error prone, he recommended automating the process with existing punched card based unit record equipment. One of the hardest problems was getting a high-quality printout of the tables. Initially IBM 405 accounting machines with special modifications were used, but he wanted something better. In 1941 Eckert developed a specification for a card-driven composing typewriter and asked IBM to design and build it.

The first Electromatic Table Printing Machine was delivered to him in 1945. It produced its first Air Almanac in 1946.
