= Babylonian astronomy =

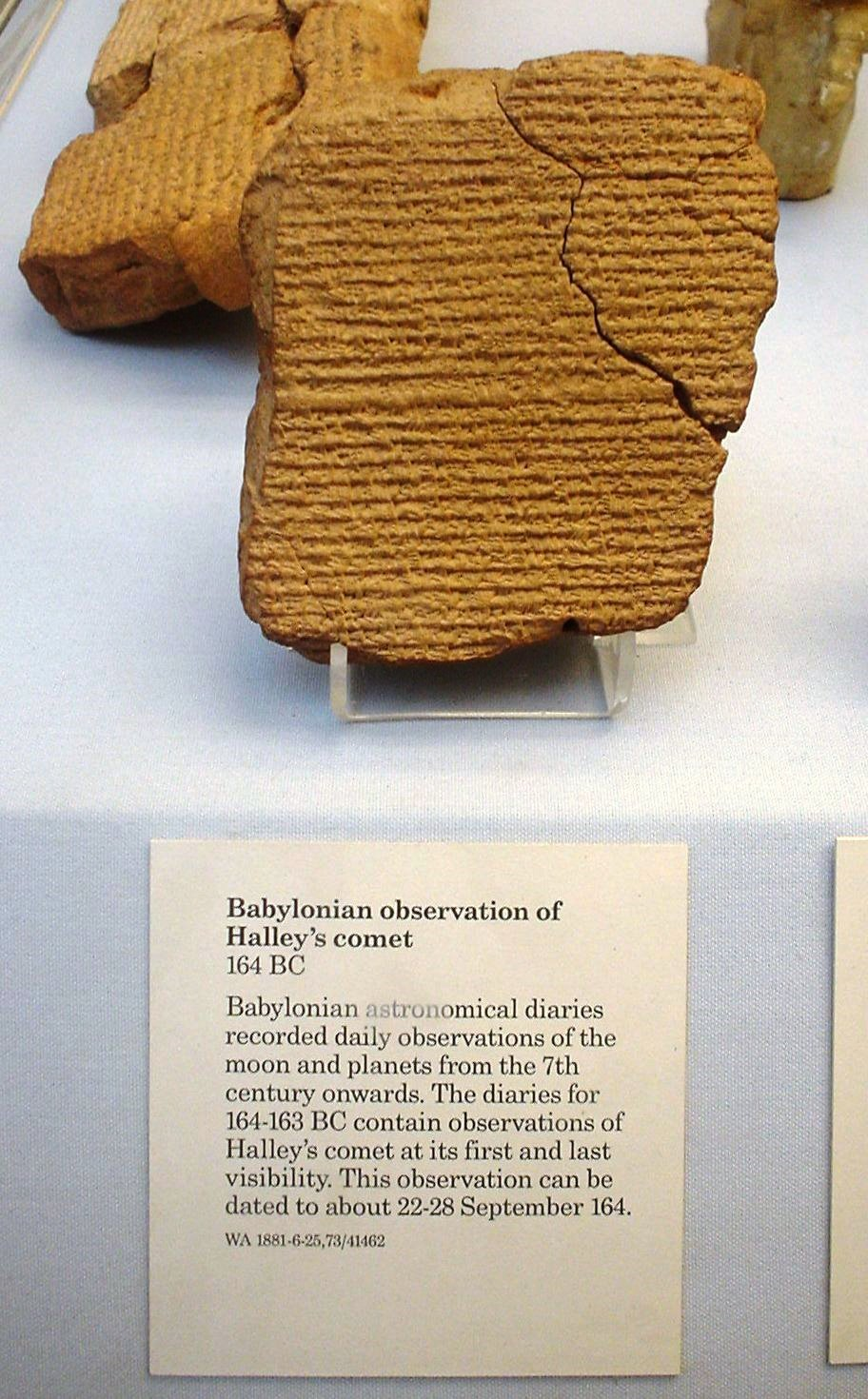
A Babylonian tablet recording Halley's Comet in 164 BC

Babylonian astronomy was the study or recording of celestial objects during the early history of Mesopotamia. The numeral system used, sexagesimal, was based on 60, as opposed to ten in the modern decimal system. This system simplified the calculating and recording of unusually great and small numbers.

During the 8th and 7th centuries BC, Babylonian astronomers developed a new empirical approach to astronomy. They began studying and recording their belief system and philosophies dealing with an ideal nature of the universe and began employing an internal logic within their predictive planetary systems. This was an important contribution to astronomy and the philosophy of science, and some modern scholars have thus referred to this approach as a scientific revolution. This approach to astronomy was adopted and further developed in Greek and Hellenistic astrology. Classical Greek and Latin sources frequently use the term Chaldeans for the philosophers, who were considered as priest-scribes specializing in astronomical and other forms of divination. Babylonian astronomy paved the way for modern astrology and is responsible for its spread across the Graeco-Roman empire during the 2nd-century Hellenistic Period. The Babylonians used the sexagesimal system to trace the planets' transits, by dividing the 360 degree sky into 30 degrees, they assigned 12 zodiacal signs to the stars along the ecliptic.

Only fragments of Babylonian astronomy have survived, consisting largely of contemporary clay tablets containing astronomical diaries, ephemerides and procedure texts, hence current knowledge of Babylonian planetary theory is in a fragmentary state. Nevertheless, the surviving fragments show that Babylonian astronomy was the first "successful attempt at giving a refined mathematical description of astronomical phenomena" and that "all subsequent varieties of scientific astronomy, in the Hellenistic world, in India, in Islam, and in the West ... depend upon Babylonian astronomy in decisive and fundamental ways".

== Old Babylonian astronomy ==
An object labelled the ivory prism was recovered from the ruins of Nineveh. First presumed to be describing rules to a game, its use was later deciphered to be a unit converter for calculating the movement of celestial bodies and constellations.

Babylonian astronomers developed zodiacal signs. They are made up of the division of the sky into three sets of thirty degrees and the constellations that inhabit each sector.

The MUL.APIN contains catalogues of stars and constellations as well as schemes for predicting heliacal risings and settings of the planets, and lengths of daylight as measured by a water clock, gnomon, shadows, and intercalations. The Babylonian GU text arranges stars in 'strings' that lie along declination circles and thus measure right-ascensions or time intervals, and also employs the stars of the zenith, which are also separated by given right-ascensional differences.

=== Planetary theory ===
The Babylonians were the first civilization known to possess a functional theory of the planets. The oldest surviving planetary astronomical text is the Babylonian Venus tablet of Ammisaduqa, a 7th-century BC copy of a list of observations of the motions of the planet Venus that probably dates as early as the second millennium BC. The Babylonian astrologers also laid the foundations of what would eventually become Western astrology. The Enuma anu enlil, written during the Neo-Assyrian period in the 7th century BC, comprises a list of omens and their relationships with various celestial phenomena including the motions of the planets.

=== Cosmology ===
In contrast to the world view presented in Mesopotamian and Assyro-Babylonian literature, particularly in Mesopotamian and Babylonian mythology, very little is known about the cosmology and world view of the ancient Babylonian astrologers and astronomers. This is largely due to the current fragmentary state of Babylonian planetary theory, and also due to Babylonian astronomy and cosmology largely being separate endeavors. Nevertheless, traces of cosmology can be found in Babylonian literature and mythology.

=== Omens ===
It was a common Mesopotamian belief that gods could and did indicate future events to mankind through omens; sometimes through animal entrails, but most often they believed omens could be read through astronomy and astrology. Since omens via the planets were produced without any human action, they were seen as more powerful. But they believed the events these omens foretold were also avoidable. The relationship Mesopotamians had with omens can be seen in the Omen Compendia, a Babylonian text composed starting from the beginning of the second millennium on-wards. It is the primary source text that tells us that ancient Mesopotamians saw omens as preventable. The text also contains information on Sumerian rites to avert evil, or “nam-bur-bi”, a term later adopted by the Akkadians as “namburbu”, meaning roughly, “[the evil] loosening”. The god Ea was the one believed to send the omens. Concerning the severity of omens, eclipses were seen as the most dangerous.

The Enuma Anu Enlil is a series of cuneiform tablets that gives insight on different sky omens Babylonian astronomers observed. Celestial bodies such as the Sun and Moon were given significant power as omens. Reports from Nineveh and Babylon, circa 2500-670 B.C., show lunar omens observed by the Mesopotamians. "When the moon disappears, evil will befall the land. When the moon disappears out of its reckoning, an eclipse will take place".

=== Astrolabes ===
The astrolabes (not to be mistaken for the later astronomical measurement device of the same name) are one of the earliest documented cuneiform tablets that discuss astronomy and date back to the Old Babylonian Kingdom. They are a list of thirty-six stars connected with the months in a year, generally considered to be written between 1800 and 1100 B.C. No complete texts have been found, but there is a modern compilation by Theophilus Pinches, assembled from texts housed in the British Museum that is considered excellent by other historians who specialize in Babylonian astronomy. Two other texts concerning the astrolabes that should be mentioned are the Brussels and Berlin compilations. They offer similar information to the Pinches anthology, but do contain some differing information from each other.

The thirty-six stars that make up the astrolabes are believed to be derived from the astronomical traditions from three Mesopotamian city-states, Elam, Akkad, and Amurru. The stars followed and possibly charted by these city-states are identical stars to the ones in the astrolabes. Each region had a set of twelve stars it followed, which combined equals the thirty-six stars in the astrolabes. The twelve stars of each region also correspond to the months of the year. The two cuneiform texts that provide the information for this claim are the large star list “K 250” and “K 8067”. Both of these tablets were translated and transcribed by Weidner. During the reign of Hammurabi these three separate traditions were combined. This combining also ushered in a more scientific approach to astronomy as connections to the original three traditions weakened. The increased use of science in astronomy is evidenced by the traditions from these three regions being arranged in accordance to the paths of the stars of Ea, Anu, and Enlil, an astronomical system contained and discussed in the MUL.APIN.

=== MUL.APIN ===
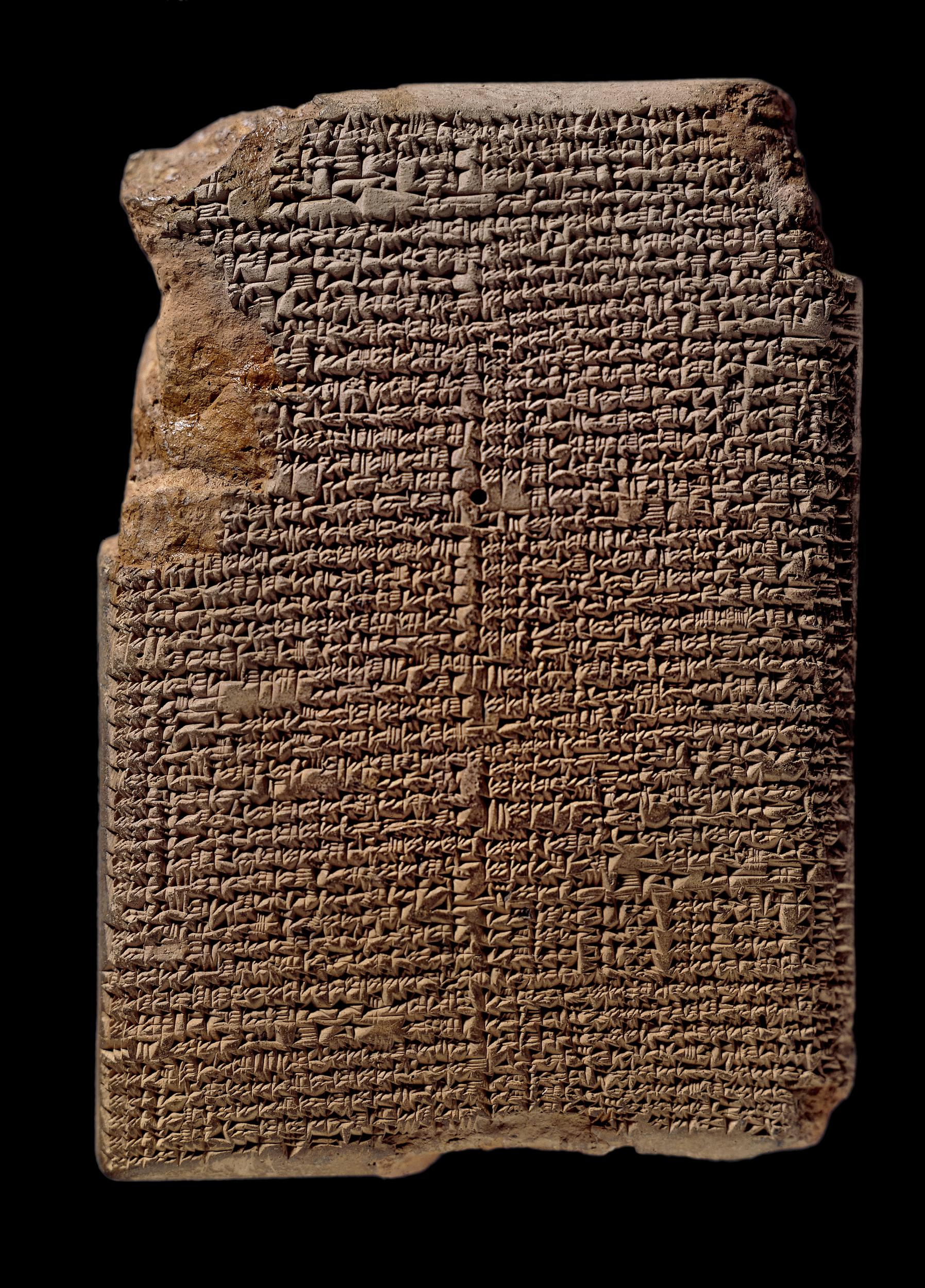
Mul.apin cuneiform tablet

MUL.APIN is a collection of two cuneiform tablets (Tablet 1 and Tablet 2) that document aspects of Babylonian astronomy such as the movement of celestial bodies and records of solstices and eclipses. Each tablet is also split into smaller sections called Lists. It was comprised in the general time frame of the astrolabes and Enuma Anu Enlil, evidenced by similar themes, mathematical principles, and occurrences.

Tablet 1 houses information that closely parallels information contained in astrolabe B. The similarities between Tablet 1 and astrolabe B show that the authors were inspired by the same source for at least some of the information. There are six lists of stars on this tablet that relate to sixty constellations in charted paths of the three groups of Babylonian star paths, Ea, Anu, and Enlil. There are also additions to the paths of both Anu and Enlil that are not found in astrolabe B.

=== Relationship of calendar, mathematics and astronomy ===
The exploration of the Sun, Moon, and other celestial bodies affected the development of Mesopotamian culture. The study of the sky led to the development of a calendar and advanced mathematics in these societies. The Babylonians were not the first complex society to develop a calendar globally and nearby in North Africa, the Egyptians developed a calendar of their own. The Egyptian calendar was solar based, while the Babylonian calendar was lunar based. A potential blend between the two that has been noted by some historians is the adoption of a crude leap year by the Babylonians after the Egyptians developed one. The Babylonian leap year shares no similarities with the leap year practiced today. It involved the addition of a thirteenth month as a means to re-calibrate the calendar to better match the growing season.

Babylonian priests were the ones responsible for developing new forms of mathematics and did so to better calculate the movements of celestial bodies. One such priest, Naburimannu, is the first documented Babylonian astronomer. He was a priest for the moon god and is credited with writing lunar and eclipse computation tables as well as other elaborate mathematical calculations. The computation tables are organized in seventeen or eighteen tables that document the orbiting speeds of planets and the Moon. His work was later recounted by astronomers during the Seleucid dynasty.

=== Aurorae ===
A team of scientists at the University of Tsukuba studied Assyrian cuneiform tablets, reporting unusual red skies which might be aurorae incidents, caused by geomagnetic storms between 680 and 650 BC.

== Neo-Babylonian astronomy ==
Neo-Babylonian astronomy refers to the astronomy developed by Chaldean astronomers during the Neo-Babylonian, Achaemenid, Seleucid, and Parthian periods of Mesopotamian history. The systematic records in Babylonian astronomical diaries allowed for the observation of a repeating 18-year Saros cycle of lunar eclipses.

=== Arithmetical and geometrical methods ===
Though there is a lack of surviving material on Babylonian planetary theory, it appears most of the Chaldean astronomers were concerned mainly with ephemerides and not with theory. It had been thought that most of the predictive Babylonian planetary models that have survived were usually strictly empirical and arithmetical, and usually did not involve geometry, cosmology, or speculative philosophy like that of the later Hellenistic models, though the Babylonian astronomers were concerned with the philosophy dealing with the ideal nature of the early universe. Babylonian procedure texts describe, and ephemerides employ, arithmetical procedures to compute the time and place of significant astronomical events. More recent analysis of previously unpublished cuneiform tablets in the British Museum, dated between 350 and 50 BC, demonstrates that Babylonian astronomers sometimes used geometrical methods, prefiguring the methods of the Oxford Calculators, to describe the motion of Jupiter over time in an abstract mathematical space.

Aside from occasional interactions between the two, Babylonian astronomy was largely independent from Babylonian cosmology. Whereas Greek astronomers expressed "prejudice in favor of circles or spheres rotating with uniform motion", such a preference did not exist for Babylonian astronomers.

Contributions made by the Chaldean astronomers during this period include the discovery of eclipse cycles and saros cycles, and many accurate astronomical observations. For example, they observed that the Sun's motion along the ecliptic was not uniform, though they were unaware of why this was; it is today known that this is due to the Earth moving in an elliptic orbit around the Sun, with the Earth moving swifter when it is nearer to the Sun at perihelion and moving slower when it is farther away at aphelion.

=== Heliocentric astronomy ===
The only surviving planetary model from among the Chaldean astronomers is that of the Hellenistic Seleucus of Seleucia (b. 190 BC), who supported the Greek Aristarchus of Samos' heliocentric model. Seleucus is known from the writings of Plutarch, Aetius, Strabo, and Muhammad ibn Zakariya al-Razi. The Greek geographer Strabo lists Seleucus as one of the four most influential astronomers, who came from Hellenistic Seleuceia on the Tigris, alongside Kidenas (Kidinnu), Naburianos (Naburimannu), and Sudines. Their works were originally written in the Akkadian language and later translated into Greek. Seleucus, however, was unique among them in that he was the only one known to have supported the heliocentric theory of planetary motion proposed by Aristarchus, where the Earth rotated around its own axis which in turn revolved around the Sun. According to Plutarch, Seleucus even proved the heliocentric system through reasoning, though it is not known what arguments he used.

According to Lucio Russo, his arguments were probably related to the phenomenon of tides. Seleucus correctly theorized that tides were caused by the Moon, although he believed that the interaction was mediated by the Earth's atmosphere. He noted that the tides varied in time and strength in different parts of the world. According to Strabo (1.1.9), Seleucus was the first to state that the tides are due to the attraction of the Moon, and that the height of the tides depends on the Moon's position relative to the Sun.

According to Bartel Leendert van der Waerden, Seleucus may have proved the heliocentric theory by determining the constants of a geometric model for the heliocentric theory and by developing methods to compute planetary positions using this model. He may have used trigonometric methods that were available in his time, as he was a contemporary of Hipparchus.

None of his original writings or Greek translations have survived, though a fragment of his work has survived only in Arabic translation, which was later referred to by the Persian philosopher Muhammad ibn Zakariya al-Razi (865-925).

== Babylonian influence on Hellenistic astronomy ==
Many of the works of ancient Greek and Hellenistic writers (including mathematicians, astronomers, and geographers) have been preserved up to the present time, or some aspects of their work and thought are still known through later references. However, achievements in these fields by earlier ancient Near Eastern civilizations, notably those in Babylonia, were forgotten for a long time. Since the discovery of key archaeological sites in the 19th century, many cuneiform writings on clay tablets have been found, some of them related to astronomy. Most known astronomical tablets have been described by Abraham Sachs and later published by Otto Neugebauer in the Astronomical Cuneiform Texts (ACT). Herodotus writes that the Greeks learned such aspects of astronomy as the gnomon and the idea of the day being split into two halves of twelve from the Babylonians. Other sources point to Greek pardegms, a stone with 365-366 holes carved into it to represent the days in a year, from the Babylonians as well.

=== Influence on Hipparchus and Ptolemy ===
In 1900, Franz Xaver Kugler demonstrated that Ptolemy had stated in his Almagest IV.2 that Hipparchus improved the values for the Moon's periods known to him from "even more ancient astronomers" by comparing eclipse observations made earlier by "the Chaldeans", and by himself. However Kugler found that the periods that Ptolemy attributes to Hipparchus had already been used in Babylonian ephemerides, specifically the collection of texts nowadays called "System B" (sometimes attributed to Kidinnu). Apparently Hipparchus only confirmed the validity of the periods he learned from the Chaldeans by his newer observations. Later Greek knowledge of this specific Babylonian theory is confirmed by 2nd-century papyrus, which contains 32 lines of a single column of calculations for the Moon using this same "System B", but written in Greek on papyrus rather than in cuneiform on clay tablets.

=== Means of transmission ===
Historians have found evidence that Athens during the late 5th century may have been aware of Babylonian astronomy, astronomers, or astronomical concepts and practices through the documentation by Xenophon of Socrates telling his students to study astronomy to the extent of being able to tell the time of night from the stars. This skill is referenced in the poem of Aratus, which discusses telling the time of night from the zodiacal signs.

== See also ==
- Babylonian astrology
- Babylonian calendar
- Babylonian mathematics
- Babylonian star catalogues
- Egyptian astronomy
- History of astronomy (Section on Mesopotamia).
- Mayan astronomy
- MUL.APIN
- Pleiades
- Venus tablet of Ammisaduqa
