= IBM Naval Ordnance Research Calculator =

1950s computer

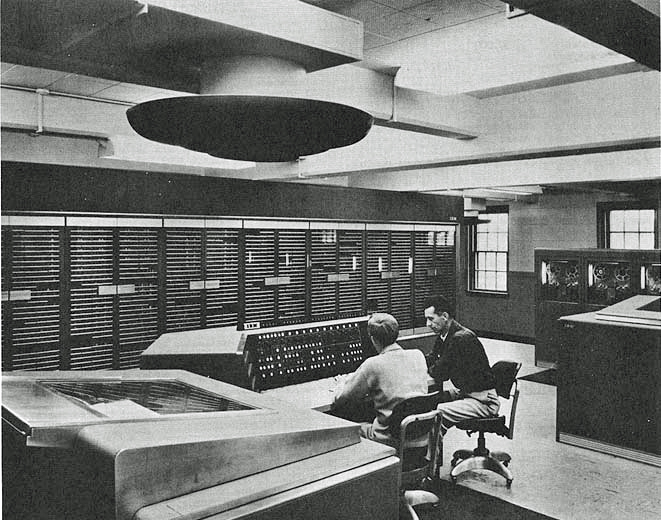
NORC

The IBM Naval Ordnance Research Calculator (NORC) was a one-of-a-kind first-generation (vacuum tube) computer built by IBM for the United States Navy's Bureau of Ordnance. It went into service in December 1954 and was likely the most powerful computer at the time. The Naval Ordnance Research Calculator (NORC), was designed and built at the Watson Scientific Computing Laboratory under the direction of Wallace Eckert.

The computer was presented to the US Navy on December 2, 1954. At the presentation ceremony, it calculated pi to 3,089 digits, which was a record at the time. The calculation took only 13 minutes. In 1955, NORC was moved to the Naval Proving Ground at Dahlgren, Virginia. It was their main computer until 1958, when more modern computers were acquired. It continued to be used until 1963. Its design influenced the IBM 701 and subsequent machines in the IBM 700 series of computers.

== Technology ==
The machine originally used Williams–Kilburn tubes for memory which stored 2,000 words electrostatically, with an access time of 8 microseconds. Each word consisted of 16 decimal digits, using four bits to represent each digit, plus two modulo-4 error-checking bits. A word could store a 13-digit number with sign and 2-digit index, or one instruction. NORC used four sets of 66 electrostatic tubes in parallel for memory. Each of the tubes in a set of 66 stored one bit of each of 500 words, so each of the four sets of 66 tubes stored 2,000 words. An upgrade to the addressing circuitry for the Williams tubes allowed memory per tube to be expanded from 500 bits to 900 bits, expanding the total memory to 3,600 words without needing to add any more Williams tubes.

At some point the Williams tube memory was replaced with 20,000 words of magnetic-core memory, with an access time of 8 microseconds.

The speed of the NORC was 15,000 operations per second. An addition took 15 microseconds, a multiplication took 31 microseconds, and a division took 227 microseconds, not counting memory access time and checking. It had the capacity to do double precision arithmetic, which was used occasionally.

The main hardware consisted of 1,982 pluggable units, each of which typically had several vacuum tubes plus supporting electronics. There were 62 types of pluggable units, but half of the circuitry used only six of the types and 80% of the circuitry used only 18 of the types. With 1,300 vacuum tubes in the three systems of the computer, the NORC had a total of 9,800 vacuum tubes and 10,000 crystal diodes were used.

35mm film output created by the NORC, from the collection of Mary Louise McKee Hagemeyer, a mathematician who programmed the NORC at Dahlgren from 1955-1960

The NORC had eight magnetic tape units which were similar to the tape drives on the IBM 701 system. The reels were 8 inches in diameter and somewhat similar in appearance to a metal 16 mm film reel. Unlike the 701 series tape drives, there was no operator control panel on the face of the machine, instead there were buttons placed on the top front of the machines that were used to initiate tape loading, rewinding, unloading, etc. The drives could read or write 71,500 characters per second. It had two printers that could print 150 lines per minute, although only one printer could be used at a time. It also had a card reader which could read 100 cards per minute, with four words stored per card. It also had a display unit which consisted of a CRT tube and a 35 mm film camera which photographed the face of the tube and then sent the film through a develop and fix process before it was projected on a rear projection screen approximately 12 frames after the initial exposure. High-volume data could also be recorded as text on the film, and employees of the Naval Weapons Laboratory would often work overtime in a darkened room scanning the films for obvious recording failures in critical data.

== Awards and honors ==
The main-belt asteroid 1625 The NORC was named by Paul Herget in honor of the electronic calculator which significantly facilitated the elaborate orbital calculations of minor planets at the time (M.P.C. 1591).

Records
Preceded by MIT Whirlwind I	World's most powerful computer 1955–1957	Succeeded by AN/FSQ-7
