= Naburimannu =

Ancient astronomer and mathematician

Nabu-ri-man-nu (also spelled Nabu-rimanni; Greek sources called him Ναβουριανός, Nabourianos, Latin Naburianus) (fl. c. 6th – 3rd century BC) was a Chaldean astronomer and mathematician.

Classical and ancient cuneiform sources mention an astronomer with this name:

- The Greek geographer Strabo of Amaseia, in Geography 16.1–.6, writes: "In Babylon a settlement is set apart for the local philosophers, the Chaldaeans, as they are called, who are concerned mostly with astronomy; but some of these, who are not approved of by the others, profess to be writers of horoscopes. (There is also a tribe of the Chaldaeans, and a territory inhabited by them, in the neighborhood of the Arabs and of the Persian Gulf, as it is called.) There are also several tribes of the Chaldaean astronomers. For example, some are called Orcheni [those from Uruk], others Borsippeni [those from Borsippa], and several others by different names, as though divided into different sects which hold to various dogmas about the same subjects. And the mathematicians make mention of some of these men; as, for example, Kidenas, Nabourianos and Soudines".
- The damaged colophon of a cuneiform clay tablet (VAT 209; see ACT 18) with a Babylonian System A lunar ephemeris for the years 49–48 BC states that it is the [tersit]u of Nabu-[ri]-man-nu. This is similar to the colophons of two System B clay tablets that say that they are the tersitu of Kidinnu.

The following is an excerpt of a century of scholarship discussed in the sources referenced below. The meaning of tersitu is not known definitively. Already Franz Xaver Kugler proposed that tersitu can be interpreted as "table" here; in another context it seems to mean something like "tool", but in yet another the word refers to a blue enamel paste. P. Schnabel, in a series of papers (1923–1927), interpreted the phrase as an assignment of authorship. Based on this, he argued that Naburimannu developed the Babylonian System A of calculating Solar System ephemerides, and that Kidinnu later developed Babylonian System B. Otto E. Neugebauer has remained reserved to this conclusion and disputed Schnabel's further inferences about Naburimannu's life and work. The mathematician B.L. van der Waerden later (1963, 1968, 1974) concluded that System A was developed during the reign of Darius I (521–485 BC). System A, which uses step functions, appears to be somewhat more primitive than System B, which uses zigzag linear functions, although System A is more consistent than System B. While it thus appears that System A preceded System B, both systems remained in use at least until the 1st century BC.

The earliest preserved System A clay tablets (BM 36651, 36719, 37032, 37053) calculate an ephemeris for the planet Mercury from 424 to 401 BC. The oldest preserved lunar tablets date from 306 BC in the Hellenistic period. If Naburimannu was the originator of System A, then we can on that basis place him in Babylonia sometime between the Persian and Macedonian conquests.
