= Eckert (crater) =

Lunar impact crater

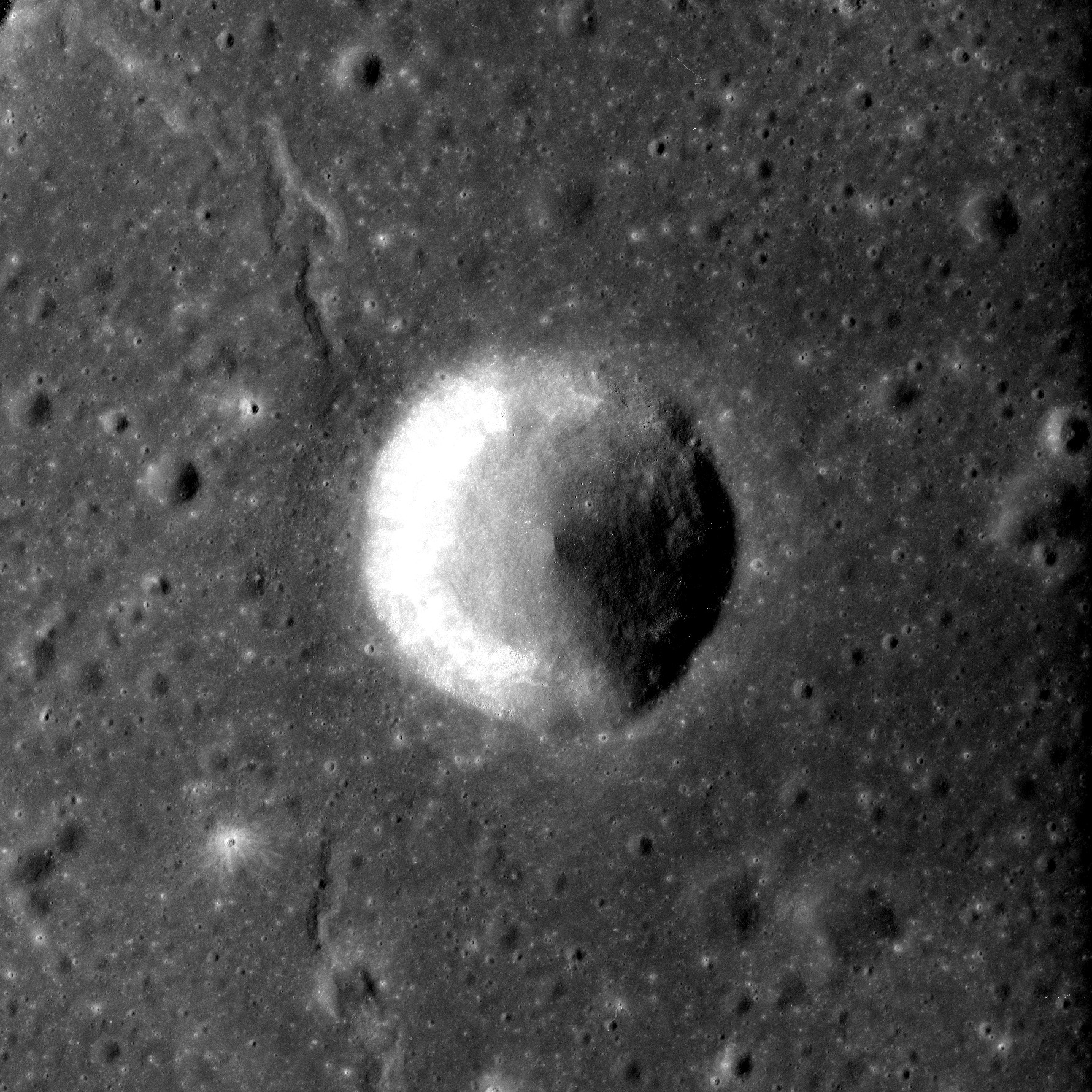
- Apollo 17 image
- Coordinates: 17.28°N 58.38°E
- Diameter: 2.62 km (1.63 mi)
- Depth: 0.35 km (0.22 mi)
- Colongitude: 302° at sunrise
- Eponym: Wallace J. Eckert

Eckert is a tiny, isolated lunar impact crater in the northern part of the Mare Crisium (a circular region of relatively dark, flat material on the surface of the Moon). This crater forms a circular pit in the dark surface of the surrounding lunar mare. Just to the west is a wrinkle ridge in the mare surface, a feature that is prominent only under oblique lighting from the Sun. The nearest craters of note are Peirce to the west-northwest, and Picard to the southwest. Both of these craters lie in the Mare Crisium basin.

The crater is named for American astronomer Wallace John Eckert (1902-1971). Its designation was adopted by the International Astronomical Union in 1973.
