= Babylonian astronomical diaries =

Babylonian cuneiform texts

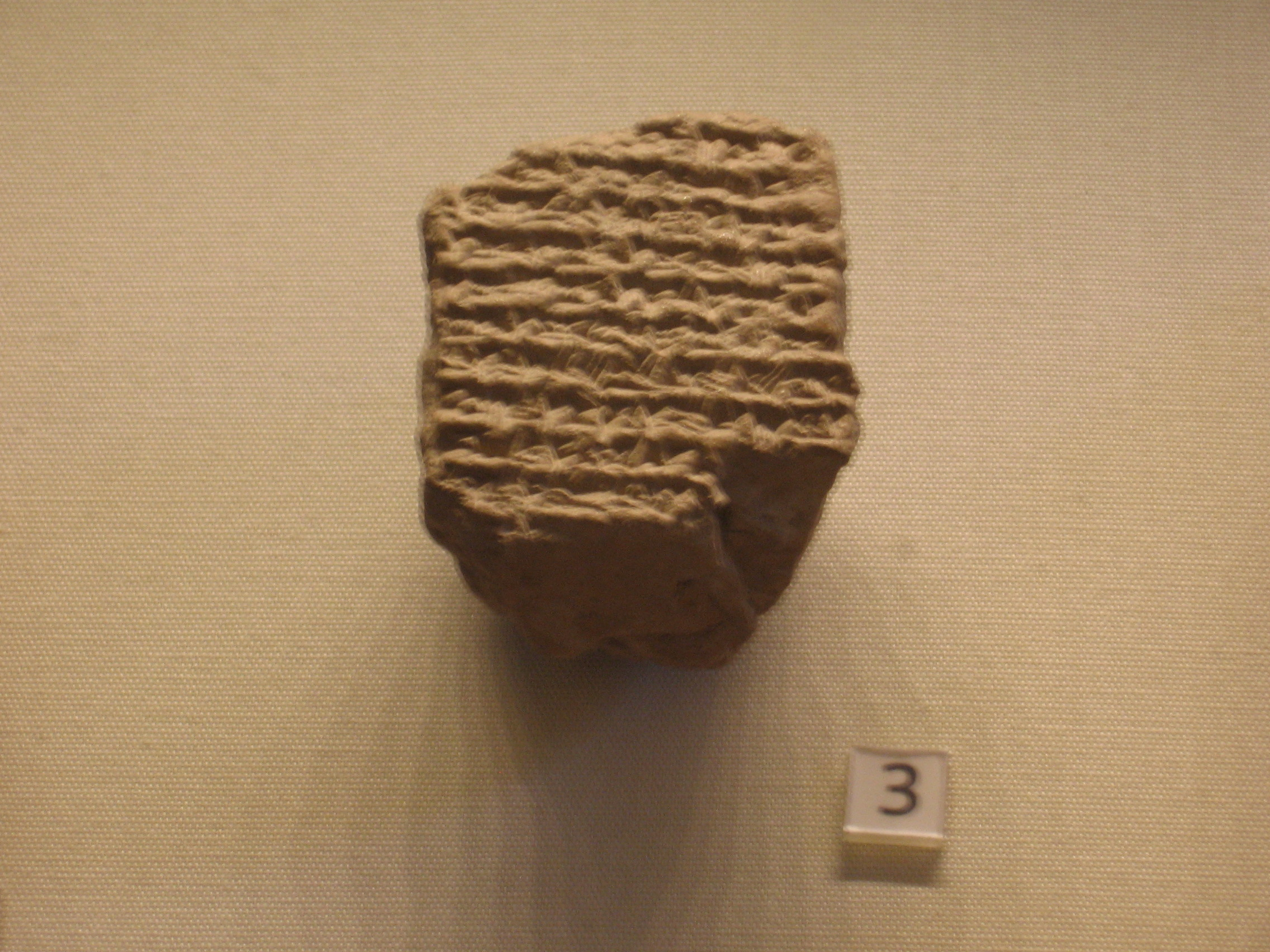
An astronomical diary recording the death of Alexander the Great (British Museum)

The Babylonian astronomical diaries are a collection of Babylonian cuneiform texts written in Akkadian language that contain systematic records of astronomical observations and political events, predictions based on astronomical observations, weather reports, and commodity prices, kept for about 700 years, from around 747 BC to 61 BC.

The commodity prices are included for six items (barley, dates, mustard (cuscuta), cress (cardamom), sesame, and wool) for particular dates.

Currently, most of the surviving several hundred clay tablets are stored in the British Museum.

These are classified as the third category of Babylonian astronomical texts, alongside the Astronomical Cuneiform Texts published by Otto Neugebauer and Abraham Sachs and GADEx, sometimes called “non-ACT” by Neugebauer.

It is suggested that the diaries were used as sources for the Babylonian Chronicles.

== History ==
The Babylonians were the first to recognise that astronomical phenomena are periodic and to apply mathematics to their predictions. The oldest known significant astronomical text is Tablet 63 of the Enûma Anu Enlil collection, the Venus tablet of Ammisaduqa, which lists the first and the last visible risings of Venus over a period of about 21 years. It is the earliest evidence that planetary phenomena were recognised as periodic.

The systematic records of ominous phenomena in astronomical diaries began during the reign of Nabonassar (747–734 BC), when a significant increase in the quality and frequency of astronomical observations occurred. That allowed, for example, the discovery of a repeating 18-year Saros cycle of lunar eclipses.

== Structure ==
Very few of the tablets are complete, and some are in an extremely fragmentary state. Where no date formula survives, it is often possible to date them based on the astronomical observations recorded. The surviving tablets range in date from the mid-7th to the 1st century BC, but the vast majority date between 400 and 60 BC.

Diaries usually cover periods of four to six months, divided into monthly sections. Daily astronomical observations form the bulk of each section. At the end of each month, the Diaries report the river level of the Euphrates; the market exchange values of several commodities in Babylon, and sometimes selected historical events such as warfare, disease outbreaks, visits from kings or officials, and cultic activities.

The Diaries contain no explicit indications of purpose, but since they exhibit significant parallelism with prognostic material, it is likely that they were connected to some extent with divination. There are also parallels in content and phrasing between the Diaries and the Late Babylonian Chronicles.

In addition to the evidence they offer about Babylonian astronomy, the Diaries are the main contemporary source for the political history of Late Achaemenid and Hellenistic Babylonia, while their records of commodity values provide exceptionally detailed and extensive economic data.

== Notable entries ==
- Antiochus, son of Seleucus IV was murdered by Antiochus IV in 170 BC.
- "The king of the world, Alexander" sent his scouts with a message to the people of Babylon before entering the city: "I shall not enter your houses"
- A description of the appearance of Halley's Comet in 163 BC. translated by Hermann Hunger.

== Translation ==
Translations of the Diaries are published in multivolume Astronomical Diaries and Related Texts from Babylonia, edited by Abraham Sachs and Hermann Hunger.

- Volume I – Diaries from 652 B.C. to 262 B.C. (ISBN 3-7001-1227-0, 1988).
- Volume II – Diaries from 261 B.C. to 165 B.C. (ISBN 3-7001-1705-1, 1989).
- Volume III – Diaries from 164 B.C. to 61 B.C. (ISBN 3-7001-2578-X, 1996).
- Volume IV – Undated Diaries and Addenda (ISBN 978-3-7001-9032-5, 2022).
- Volume V – Lunar and Planetary Texts (ISBN 3-7001-3028-7, 2001), contains lunar and planetary data from the 8th century BC to the 1st century BC.
- Volume VI – Goal Year Texts (ISBN 978-3-7001-3727-6, 2006), contains lunar and planetary data, from the 3rd century BC to the 1st century BC.
- Volume VII – Almanacs and Normal Star Almanacs (ISBN 978-3-7001-7627-5, 2014), contains astronomical almanacs, from the 3rd century BC to the 1st century AD.
