= Lucio Russo =

Italian physicist, mathematician and historian of science (1944–2025)

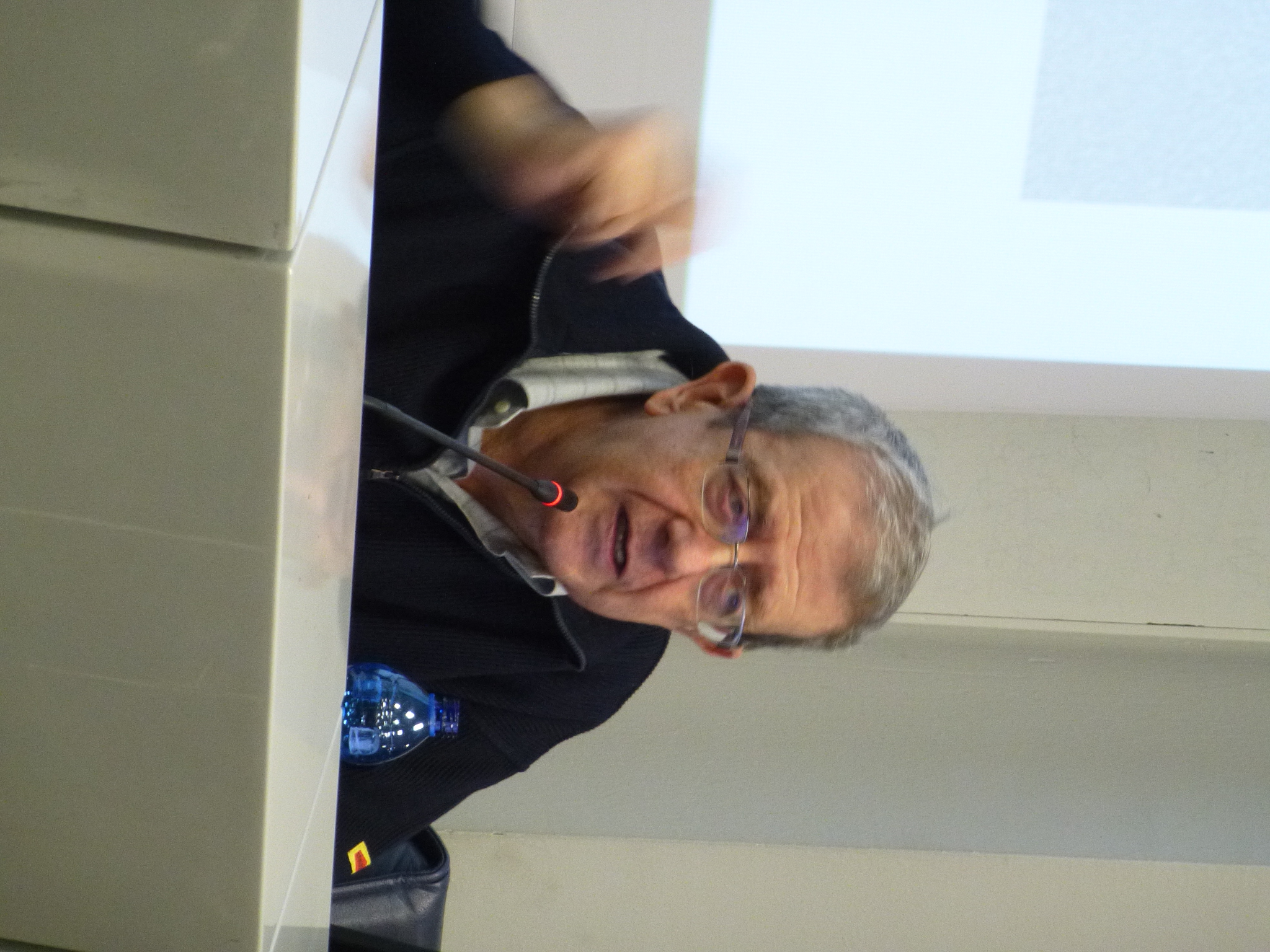
- Russo in 2014
- Born: 22 November 1944; Venice, Italy
- Died: 12 July 2025 (aged 80); Bologna, Italy
- Scientific career
- Fields: Physics; Mathematics; History of science
- Workplaces: University of Rome Tor Vergata

Lucio Russo (22 November 1944 – 12 July 2025) was an Italian physicist, mathematician and historian of science. Born in Venice, he taught at the Mathematics Department of the University of Rome Tor Vergata. He died in Bologna on 12 July 2025, at the age of 80.

Among his main areas of interest were Gibbs measure of the Ising model, percolation theory, and finite Bernoulli schemes, within which he proved an approximate version of the classical Kolmogorov's zero–one law.

In the history of science, he reconstructed some contributions of the Hellenistic astronomer Hipparchus, through the analysis of his surviving works, and the proof of heliocentrism attributed by Plutarch to Seleucus of Seleucia and studied the history of theories of tides, from the Hellenistic to modern age.

== Books ==
=== The Forgotten Revolution ===
In The Forgotten Revolution: How Science Was Born in 300 BC and Why It Had to Be Reborn (Italian: La rivoluzione dimenticata), Russo promotes the belief that Hellenistic science in the period 320–144 BC reached heights not achieved by Classical age science, and proposes that it went further than ordinarily thought, in multiple fields not normally associated with ancient science.

According to Russo, Hellenistic scientists were not simply forerunners, but actually achieved scientific results of high importance in the fields of "mathematics, solid and fluid mechanics, optics, astronomy, anatomy, physiology, scientific medicine", even psychoanalysis. They may have even discovered the inverse square law of gravitation (Russo's argument on this point hinges on well-established, but seldom discussed, evidence). Hellenistic scientists, among them Euclid, Archimedes and Eratosthenes, developed an axiomatic and deductive way of argumentation. When this way of argumentation was dropped, the ability to understand the results was lost as well. Thus, Russo conjectures that the definitions of elementary geometric objects were introduced in Euclid's Elements by Heron of Alexandria, 400 years after the work was completed. More concretely, Russo shows how the theory of tides must have been well developed in Antiquity, because several pre-Newtonian sources relay various complementary parts of the theory without grasping their import or justification (getting the empirical facts wrong but the theory right).

Hellenistic science was focused on the city of Alexandria. The emerging scientific revolution in Alexandria ended when Ptolemy VIII Physcon came to power. He engaged in mass purges and expulsions of all intellectuals. Other centres of Hellenistic science mentioned in Russo's book were Antioch, Pergamon, Cyzicus, Rhodes, Syracuse and Massilia.

He also concludes that the 17th-century scientific revolution in Europe was due in large part to the recovery of Hellenistic science. The Forgotten Revolution has received mixed reviews, praising Russo's enthusiasm but noting that his conclusions outrun his sources.

=== L'America dimenticata ===
In L'America dimenticata, Russo suggests that the Americas were known to some European civilizations in ancient times, probably discovered by the Phoenicians or the Carthaginians, but that the knowledge was lost under Roman expansion in the second century BC.

Russo notes paintings dating to the Roman period that, he claims, represent American fruits (Ananas), and small Mesoamerican toys representing wheeled trucks, when the wheel had not been invented nor used in pre-Columbian times.

With the collapse of the Hellenistic world under the attacks of the Romans around the middle of the 2nd century BC (specifically, the destruction of Corinth and Carthage in 146 BC and the expulsion of the scientific elite from Alexandria in 145 BC), he claims these geographic notions were lost. According to his theories, Ptolemy's later identification of the Blessed Islands with the Canaries was incorrect. Instead, he claims that the Blessed Islands were known to be antipodal to the eastern part of China, and that Ptolemy made ends meet by erroneously enlarging the longitude of all known places and shrinking the width of a degree of longitude (500 instead of 700 stadia).

Based on this correction, Lucio Russo claims to pinpoint the position of the mythical Thule, reached in the 4th century BC by explorer Pytheas, on the coast of Greenland. He interprets, in light of this claim, an obscure sentence of Pliny according to which Hipparchus would have enlarged the ecumene (the known world) by 26,000 stadia.

== See also ==
- Antikythera mechanism, a Hellenistic astronomical computer, which, according to Russo, is proof of the high level of knowledge in science and technology reached during Hellenism
