= Sudines =

Chaldean mathematician, astronomer and astrologer

Sudines (or Soudines) (Greek: Σουδίνες) (fl. c. 240 BC) was a Babylonian sage. He is mentioned as one of the famous Chaldean mathematicians and astronomer-astrologers by later Roman writers like Strabo (Geographia 16:1–6).

== Biography ==
Like his predecessor Berossos, Sudines moved from Babylonia and established himself among the Greeks; he was an advisor to King Attalus I (Attalos Soter) of Pergamon. He is said (e.g., by Roman astronomer/astrologer Vettius Valens) to have published tables to compute the motion of the Moon; said to have been used by the Greeks, until superseded by the work of Hipparchus and later by Ptolemy (Claudius Ptolemaios). Sudines may have been important in transmitting the astronomical knowledge of the Babylonians to the Greeks, but little is known about his work and nothing about his life. He is also said to have been one of the first to assign astrological meaning to gemstones.

== Identity ==
While other Chaldean astronomers have been tentatively identified in the cuneiform record, no Akkadian texts have yet been unearthed that reference Sudines. Stevens suggest that his name, however, looks Akkadian, with attestations of similar names like Šum(a)-iddin "He gave the name" or Šum(a)-iddina "He gave me a name" in the cuneiform record from the Neo-Assyrian and Hellenistic periods.

The 2nd century CE Greek author Polyaenus mentions an extispicer named Sudines, a job that this Sudines supposedly performed for King Attalus I of Pergamon, lending credence to the association between the astronomer Sudines and the attested diviner. However, while practitioners of astronomical science in Babylonia frequently also worked with astrological methods of celestial divination, the combination of astronomer and liver omen reader is rare, suggesting that Polyaenus' and King Attalus' Sudines is potentially different from the astronomer Sudines. Given the wide array of knowledge assigned to and associated with people named Sudines, it is unclear whether they all refer to the same person. The lack of biographical information about Sudines only adds to this difficulty.

== Astronomy ==
Sudines is associated with computations for predicting lunar eclipses, with authors such as Vettius Valens claiming that he used Sudines to compute lunar eclipses. The "use" of Sudines in Valens' Anthologies suggests that he was perhaps the author of a table of data relating to lunar eclipses, recording the dates, times, or circumstances of previous ones that later authors could use to inform their theories. Such tables are attested in the cuneiform record, where observations of lunar eclipses were recorded for the greater part of the first millennium BCE and tables made of both observed and predicted eclipses. While no table authored by Sudines has been found or is mentioned in other sources, the abundance of Babylonian tables that have survived suggests that they were an integral component of astronomical practice in this Mesopotamian culture. As a Babylonian, it is not unlikely that Sudines collaborated in the construction of astronomical tables. Moreover, other astronomers listed alongside Sudines have astronomical tables attributed to them that are not extant. Hipparchus, a foundational figure in Greek astronomy whose work became the basis for Ptolemy's Almagest, is credited as authoring a solar table that has not survived and has been the topic of much speculation.

Sudines is also credited with a particular value for the length of the solar year. Neugebauer lists Sudines' solar year length as 365 1/4 γ' ε', which Rochberg interprets as 365 + 1/4 + 1/3 + 1/5, a value that she describes as making no astronomical sense. Valens references Sudines as a table author immediately after describing various values of year lengths, including two attributed separately to the Chaldeans and the Babylonians (Anthologies 9.12). Neither the Chaldean year length of 365 1/4 1/207 nor the Babylonian year length of 365 1/4 1/144 agrees with Sudines' value.

In a 3rd century CE papyrus fragment containing a summary of a commentary on Plato's Timaeus, the Stoic philosopher Posidonius is listed as crediting Sudines with describing the planet Venus as the destroyer of women. Identifying planets as "destroyers" fits in to a larger discussion of the influences and Aristotelian qualities of the five planets, the sun, and the moon. Sudines' alleged participation in astrological as well as astronomical work fits in with Babylonian standards that did not explicitly differentiate between the two fields.

== References in classical sources ==
Sudines is referenced in Greek and Latin texts as an expert on three topics: astrological knowledge, liver divination (hepatoscopy), and properties of stones and gems. Often he is listed alongside other known Babylonian astronomers. In addition to Sudines, Vettius Valens lists Kidenas, a Babylonian astronomer known from other references in Greek sources as well as the colophons of some Babylonian ephemerides. Valens also references Greek astronomers Hipparchus and Apollinarius who are both known to have iterated over Babylonian arithmetic methods and to have used Babylonian parameters and observations as integral parts of their astronomical theories.

In addition to the sources listed below, Stevens points to a reference to Σωδίνων from a list of canonographers from a Vatican Aratea manuscript (Vat gr. 381).

=== Vettius Valens ===
Ἔδοξεν οῦν μοι χρῆσθαι Ἱππάρχῳ μέν πρός τόν Ἥλιον, Σουδίνῃ δέ καὶ Ἀπολλωνίῳ πρός τήν Σελήνην, ἔτι δέ καὶ Ἀπολλιναρίῳ πρός ἀμφότερα τά ἔιδη

"I thought it best to use Hipparchus for the sun, Sudines, Kidenas, and Apollonius for the moon, in addition to Apollinarius for both bodies."

— Vettius Valens, Anthologies 9.12

=== Strabo ===
ἔστι δὲ καὶ τῶν Χαλδαίων τῶν ἀστρονομικῶν γένη πλείω: καὶ γὰρ Ὀρχηνοί τινες προσαγορεύονται καὶ Βορσιππηνοὶ καὶ ἄλλοι πλείους ὡς ἂν κατὰ αἱρέσεις ἄλλα καὶ ἄλλα νέμοντες περὶ τῶν αὐτῶν δόγματα. μέμνηνται δὲ καὶ τῶν ἀνδρῶν ἐνίων οἱ μαθηματικοί, καθάπερ Κιδήνα τε καὶ Ναβουριανοῦ καὶ Σουδίνου: καὶ Σέλευκος δ᾽ ὁ ἀπὸ τῆς Σελευκείας Χαλδαῖός ἐστι καὶ ἄλλοι πλείους ἀξιόλογοι ἄνδρες.

"There are many kinds of Chaldaean astronomers: Some are called Orcheni and Borsippeni and many others, as if divided into sects, who dispense different opinions on the same subjects. The mathematicians make mention of some of these men, such as Kidenas and Nabourianos and Sudines. And Seleucus from Seleuceia is a Chaldaean, and more remarkable men."

— Strabo, Geographia 16.1.6

=== Pliny the Elder ===
Nec in Acarnania ante laudati reperiuntur, enormes et fere coloris marmorei. meliores circa Actium, sed et hi parvi, et in Mauretaniae maritimis. Alexander polyhistor et Sudines senescere eos putant coloremque expirare.

"And there are not found in Acarnania the formerly celebrated pearls of an exceptional size and almost a marble colour. Better ones are found round Actium, but these too are small, and in sea-board Mauretania. Alexander the Encyclopaedist and Sudines think that they grow old and let their colour evaporate."

— Pliny the Elder, Historia Naturalis IX.56

Onychem in Arabiae tantum montibus nec usquam aliubi nasci putavere nostri veteres, Sudines in Carmania.

"Onyx marble was supposed by our old authorities to occur in the mountains of Arabia and nowhere else. Sudines, however, thought that it occurred in Carmania."

— Pliny the Elder, Historia Naturalis XXXVI.12

hoc mirum quod Xenocrates Ephesius tradit, aratro in Asia et Cypro excitari; non enim reperiri in terreno nec nisi inter cautes creditum fuerat. similius veri est, quod idem Xenocrates tradit, et torrentibus saepe deportari. Sudines negat nisi ad meridiem spectantibus locis nasci.

"The surprising remark is made by Xenocrates of Ephesus that in Asia Minor and Cyprus rock-crystal is turned up by the plough, for previously it was not thought to occur in soil, but only amidst rocks. A more plausible statement is made by the same Xenocrates is that it is also often carried down by torrents. Sudines maintains that it occurs only in places that face south."

— Pliny the Elder, Historia Naturalis XXXVII.9

Demostratus lyncurium vocat et fieri ex urina lyncum bestiarum, e maribus fulvum et igneum, e feminis languidius atque candidum; alios id dicere langurium et esse in Italia bestias languros. Zenothemis langas vocat easdem et circa Padum iis vitam adsignat, Sudines arborem, quae gignat in Liguria, vocari lynca. in eadem sententia et Metrodorus fuit

"Demonstratus calls amber 'lyncurium,' or 'lynx-urine,' and alleges that it is formed of the urine of the wild beasts known as lynxes, the males producing the kind that is tawny and fiery in colour, and the females, that which is fainter and light in colour. According to him, others call it 'langurium' and state that the beasts, which live in Italy, are 'languri.' Zenothemis calls the same beasts 'langes' and assigns them a habitat on the banks of the Po, while Sudines writes that a tree which produces amber in Liguria is called 'lynx.'"

— Pliny the Elder, Historia Naturalis XXXVII.34-35

Sudines dicit in gemma esse candorem unguis humani similitudine, item chrysolithi colorem et sardae et iaspidis, Zenothemis Indicam onychem plures habere varietates, igneam, nigram, corneam, cingentibus candidis venis oculi modo, intervenientibus quarundam et obliquis venis.

"Sudines states that in onyx one finds a white band resembling a human fingernail, as well as the colour of the 'chrysolith,' the sard and the iaspis, while Zenothemis mentions that the Indian onyx has several different colours, fiery red, black and that of horn, surrounded by a white layer as in an eye, and in some cases traversed by a slanting layer."

— Pliny the Elder, Historia Naturalis XXXVII.24

India et has generat et nilion, fulgore ab ea distantem brevi et, cum intueare, fallaci. Sudines dicit et in Sibero Atticae flumine nasci.

"India produces not only these stones, but also the 'nilios,' which differs from the 'chrysoprasus' in showing a weak lustre and one that is elusive when it is looked at closely. Sudines states that it is found also in the Siberus, a river in Attica."

— Pliny the Elder, Historia Naturalis XXXVII.35

Astolon Sudines dicit oculis piscium similem esse, radiare fulgore candido ut solem.

"The 'astolos' according to Sudines, resembles the eye of a fish and sheds brilliant white beams like the sun."

— Pliny the Elder, Historia Naturalis XXXVII.50
