= Abraham Sachs =

American Assyriologist (1914–1983)

Abraham (Abe) Sachs (1915 – April 22, 1983) was an American Assyriologist. He earned his PhD in Assyriology in 1939 at Johns Hopkins University.

Of note is his collaboration with Otto Neugebauer, whom he met in 1941 when the latter visited the Oriental Institute in Chicago. Neugebauer and Sachs worked jointly on the publication of Babylonian astronomical texts.

In 1948, Sachs was offered (and declined) the Chair in Assyriology at Johns Hopkins University in succession to William Albright.

In 1949, he worked at the Pontificio Instituto Biblico. In 1952, he received a Rockefeller Foundation travel grant to study Babylonian astronomical diaries in the British Museum, where he had access to the texts stocked by the pioneer British assyriologist Theophilus Pinches between 1895 and 1900.

Sachs died due to cancer, leaving the task to Austrian assyriologist Hermann Hunger.

Attention has been drawn to Sach's well-informed and humorous rebuttal of Immanuel Velikovsky's use of ancient astronomical texts during a debate at Brown University in 1965, which Velikovsky failed to contest ever afterwards.
