= Wallace John Eckert =

American astronomer (1902–1971)

- Born: June 19, 1902; Pittsburgh, Pennsylvania, US
- Died: August 24, 1971 (aged 69)
- Known for: Scientific computing
- Awards: James Craig Watson Medal (1966)
- Scientific career
- Fields: Astronomy
- Institutions: Columbia University; United States Naval Observatory
- Doctoral advisor: Ernest William Brown

Wallace John Eckert (June 19, 1902 – August 24, 1971) was an American astronomer, who directed the Thomas J. Watson Astronomical Computing Bureau at Columbia University which evolved into the research division of IBM.

== Life ==
Eckert was born in Pittsburgh on June 19, 1902. Shortly thereafter, his parents John and Anna Margaret (née Heil) Eckert moved to Erie County, Pennsylvania, where they raised their four sons on a farm in Albion, PA. Wallace graduated from Albion High School in a class of six boys and eight girls. He graduated from Oberlin College in 1925, and earned an MA from Amherst College in 1926.

He started teaching at Columbia University in 1926, and earned his PhD from Yale in 1931 in astronomy under Professor Ernest William Brown (1866–1938).

He married Dorothy Woodworth Applegate in 1932. They raised three children, Alice, John and Penelope.

He was not related to another computer pioneer of the time, J. Presper Eckert (1919–1995).

He attended the launch of Apollo 14 just before his death August 24, 1971, in New Jersey.

A lunar crater, located within Mare Crisium, is named in his honor.

== Solution of differential equations for astronomy ==
Around 1933, Eckert proposed interconnecting punched card tabulating machines from IBM located in Columbia's Rutherford Laboratory to perform more than simple statistical calculations. Eckert arranged with IBM president Thomas J. Watson for a donation of newly developed IBM 601 calculating punch, which could multiply instead of just adding and subtracting. In 1937, the facility was named the Thomas J. Watson Astronomical Computing Bureau. IBM support included customer service and hardware circuit modifications needed to tabulate numbers, create mathematical tables, add, subtract, multiply, reproduce, verify, create tables of differences, create tables of logarithms and perform Lagrangian interpolation, all to solve differential equations for astronomical applications. In January 1940, Eckert published Punched Card Methods in Scientific Computation, which solved the problem of predicting the orbits of the planets, using the IBM electric tabulating machines, based on the punched card. This slim book is only 136 pages, including the index.

== Naval service ==
In 1940, Eckert became director of the United States Naval Observatory in Washington, D.C. World War II had been raging in Europe for many months. The US had not yet officially joined the effort to defeat Hitler. Nonetheless, the demand for navigation tables had risen. This demand helped inspire Eckert to automate the process of creating these tables, using punched card equipment. The 1941 almanac was the first to be produced using automated equipment, down to the final typesetting. Martin Schwarzschild became director of the Columbia laboratory while Eckert was at USNO.

== Manhattan Project ==
Columbia Physics professor Dana P. Mitchell served in the Manhattan Project (developing the first nuclear weapons) at Los Alamos National Laboratory. By 1943, the laborious simulation calculations used electromechanical calculators of that time operated by human "computers," mostly wives of the scientists. Mitchell suggested using IBM machines like his colleague Eckert. Nicholas Metropolis and Richard Feynman organized a punched-card solution, proving its effectiveness for physics research. John von Neumann and others were aware of this "computing by punched cards". That helped them develop wholly electronic solutions which helped pave the way for modern computers.

== Watson laboratory ==
After the war Eckert moved back to Columbia. Watson had just had a falling out with Harvard University over a project IBM had funded. IBM would instead focus their funding on Columbia, and Eckert's laboratory was named Watson Scientific Computing Laboratory. Eckert understood the significance of his laboratory, keenly aware of the advantage of scientific calculations performed without human interventions for long stretches of computation. A massive machine built to Eckert's specifications was built and installed behind glass at IBM's headquarters on Madison Avenue in January 1948. Known as the Selective Sequence Electronic Calculator, it was used as a calculating device with some success, but served even better as a recruiting tool. Eckert published a description of the SSEC in November 1948.

As an employee of IBM, Eckert directed one of the first industrial research laboratories in the country. In 1945, he hired Herb Grosch and Llewellyn Thomas as the next two IBM research scientists, who both made significant contributions. When Cuthbert Hurd became the next PhD to be hired by IBM in 1949, he was offered a position with Eckert, but instead founded the Applied Science Department, and later directed the development of IBM's first commercial stored program computer (the IBM 701) based on the demand demonstrated by applications such as those of Eckert.

In this period he continued his innovative contributions to computational astronomy by implementing Brown's Lunar theory in his computer; developing the Improved Lunar Ephemeris; and performing the first numerical integration to compute an ephemeris for the outer planets.

In 1957, the Watson lab moved to Yorktown Heights, New York (with a new building completed in 1961) where it is known as the Thomas J. Watson Research Center. Eckert won the James Craig Watson Medal in 1966 from the US National Academy of Sciences.

== Author ==
Faster, Faster - A Simple Description of a Giant Electronic Calculator, and the Problems it Solves. Written with Rebecca Jones, Watson Scientific Computing Laboratory, Columbia University, International Business Machines. McGraw-Hill, 1955- An account for the layman. Says multiplying 1,000 pairs of ten digit numbers would take a week by hand, and could be done by an "electronic supercalculator" (of the day!) in one second.

== See also ==
- Leslie Comrie
- IBM Electromatic Table Printing Machine
- List of IBM products
- History of IBM
