= Franz Xaver Kugler =

German academic (1862–1929)

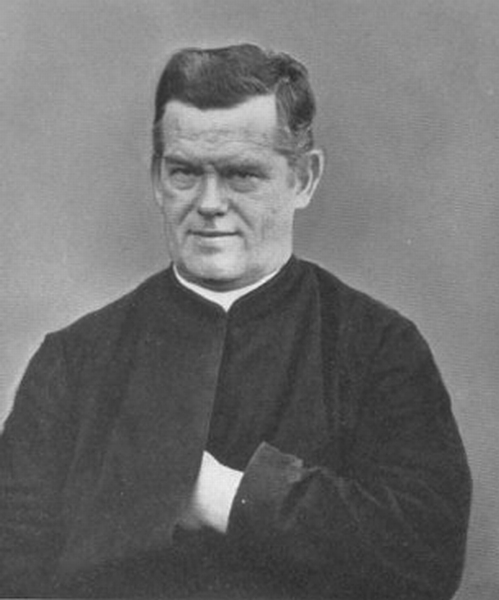
F. X. Kugler

Franz Xaver Kugler (27 November 1862 – 25 January 1929) was a German chemist, mathematician, Assyriologist, and Jesuit priest.

Kugler was born in Königsbach, Palatinate, then part of the Kingdom of Bavaria. He earned a Ph.D. in chemistry in 1885, and the following year he entered the Jesuits. By 1893 he had been ordained as a priest. Four years later at the age of 35, he became a professor of mathematics at Ignatius-College in Valkenburg in the Netherlands.

He is most noted for his studies of cuneiform tablets and Babylonian astronomy. He worked out the Babylonian theories on the Moon and planets, which were published in 1907. However his full work on Babylonian astronomy was never completed, with only three volumes out of a planned five published.

He died in Lucerne, Switzerland.

== Bibliography ==
- Die Babylonische Mondrechnung, Freiburg im Breisgau: Herder, (1900).
- Die Sternenfahrt des Gilgamesch: Kosmologische Würdigung des babylonischen Nationalepos. (1904).
- Sternkunde und Sterndienst in Babel. Münster in Westfalien: Aschendorffsche Verlagsbuchandlung, (1907). 2 Vols.
  - Volume 1
  - Volume 2 part 1
  - Volume 2, part 2.1
  - Volume 2, part 2.2
  - Supplement 1
  - Supplement 2 pt. 1-8
  - Supplement 2 pt. 9-14
- Darlegungen und Thesen über altbabylonische Chronologie, Zeitschrift für Assyriologie und verwandte Gebiete, 22 (1909), pp. 63–78 (*).
- GUR, masihu sa sattuk, KA, Zeitschrift für Assyriologie und verwandte Gebiete, 23 (1909), pp. 267–273
- Im Bannkreis Babels: panbabylonistische Konstruktionen und religionsgeschichtliche Tatsachen. Münster: Aschendorff (1910).
- Zwei Kassitenkönige der Liste A, Zeitschrift für Assyriologie und verwandte Gebiete, 24 (1910), 173–178.
- Chronologisches und Soziales aus der Zeit Lugalanda’s und Urukagina’s, Zeitschrift für Assyriologie und verwandte Gebiete, 25 (1911), 275–280.
- Contribution à la météorologie babylonienne, Revue d’assyriologie et d’archéologie orientale, 8 (1911), 107–130.
- Bemerkungen zur neuesten Königsliste, Zeitschrift für Assyriologie und verwandte Gebiete, 27 (1912), 242–245.
- Von Moses bis Paulus: Forschungen zur Geschichte Israels. Münster: Aschendorff, (1922).
- Sibyllinischer Sternkampf und Phaëthon in naturgeschichtlicher Beleuchtung Münster in Westfalen : Aschendorff (1927).

== Honors ==
- The crater Kugler on the Moon is named after him.

== See also ==
- Venus tablet of Ammisaduqa
- List of Jesuit scientists
- List of Roman Catholic scientist-clerics
