= List of astrological traditions, types, and systems =

Most human civilizations – India, Greece, Egypt, Mesopotamia, Rome, and Persia, among others – based their culture on complex systems of astrology, now considered a pseudoscience, which provided a link between the cosmos with the conditions and events on earth.

Astrological tradition contributed to the development of astronomy as the study of the skies provided invaluable insights about celestial bodies. For instance, the Ptolemaic astrological tradition has already listed some of the planets in the Solar System and their movements.

Astrology encompasses various approaches. Sidereal and tropical astrology represent different ways of mapping the zodiac against the backdrop of the stars from a geocentric perspective. Heliocentric astrology focuses on the Sun as the central point of reference, while psychological astrology delves into the intricate connections between celestial movements and the human psyche.

Across different cultures, astrology has taken on unique forms and interpretations. Chinese, Hindu, Islamic, Jewish, Tibetan, and Western astrology each offer distinct insights into the connection between the cosmos and human affairs.

The following is an incomplete list of the different traditions, types, systems, methods, applications, and branches of astrology.

== By type ==
- Horoscopic astrology – Astrology defined by the ascendant
- Natal astrology – Form of astrology based on time of birth
- Sun sign astrology – Astrology focused on the Sun sign

== By period and place ==
- Babylonian astrology (c. 1800 BCE – c. 1200 BCE)
- Persian astrology (1st century CE – present)
- Chinese astrology (c. 1050 BCE – present)
- Hellenistic astrology (2nd century BCE – 7th century CE)
- Hindu astrology (2nd century CE – present)
- Western astrology (2nd century CE – present)
- Jewish astrology (c. 350 CE – present)
- Early Irish astrology (7th – 11th centuries CE)
- Islamic astrology (7th century CE – ?)
- Heliocentric astrology (c. 1640 – present)
- Christian Astrology — a book written in 1647 by the English astrologer William Lilly
- Psychological astrology — rooted in the work of psychologist-astrologer Carl Jung, beginning c. 1920

== By function ==
- Electional astrology – Form of astrology used for planning events
  - Agricultural astrology – Electional astrology for horticulture
  - Katarchic astrology – Historical form of electional astrology
- Horary astrology – Form of astrology for answering questions posed
- Judicial astrology – Form of astrology for forecasting events
- Locational astrology – Astrology that factors in locations on Earth
- Medical astrology – Astrology of the human physiology
- Meteorological astrology – Belief that astrology can be used for weather prediction
- Mundane astrology – Branch of astrology dealing with politics, government, and law

== Recent Western developments ==
Traditions which have arisen relatively recently in the West:

- Astrocartography
- Cosmobiology
- Esoteric astrology
- Evolutionary astrology (Steven Forrest)
- Financial astrology
- Hamburg School of Astrology
- Human Design
- Synoptical astrology

== Relationships with other disciplines and systems of belief ==
- Archaeoastronomy
- Alchemy and astrology
- Astrology and astronomy
- Astrology and the classical elements
- Astrology and numerology
- Astrology and herbs
- Astrology and Tarot
- Astrology and science
- Astrotheology
- Christian views on astrology
- History of astrology
- Islam and astrology
- Jewish views on astrology

== See also ==
- Burmese zodiac
- Celtic calendar
- Dreamspell
- List of astrologers
- Mesoamerican calendars
- Qimen Dunjia
- Tai Yi Shen Shu
- Vietnamese zodiac
