= Zadanfarrukh Andarzgar =

Persian astrologer associated with the Sasanian tradition

- زادان‌فرخ اندرزگر
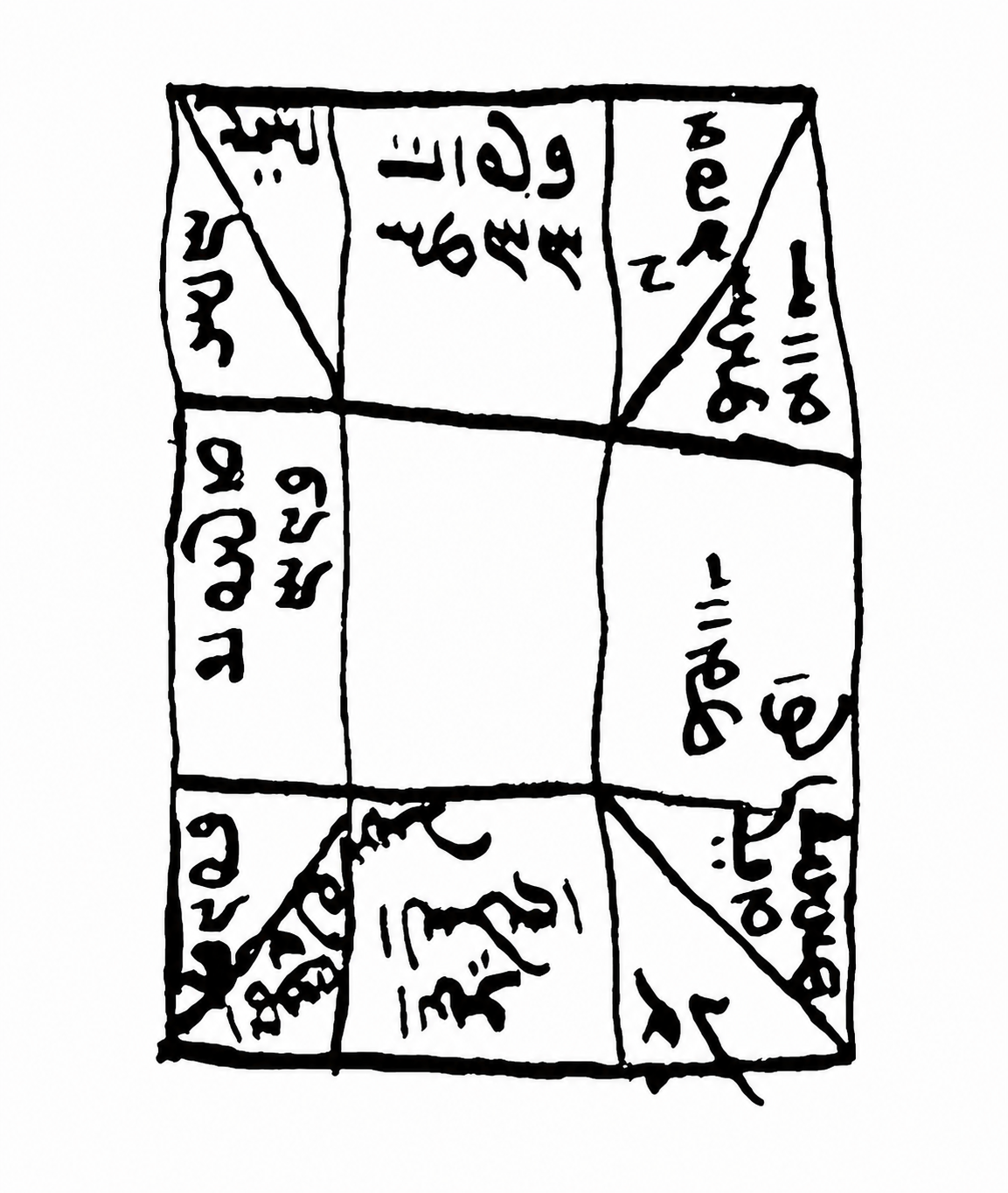
- Occupation: Astrologer
- Era: Sasanian Persian Empire
- Known for: Natal astrology and anniversary horoscopes

Zādānfarrukh Andarzgar (in Persian: زادان‌فرخ اندرزگر) was a Persian astrologer associated with the Sasanian astrological tradition. His writings in Middle Persian have not survived in their original form, but material attributed to him is preserved in Arabic quotations and adaptations.

The surviving material concerns natal astrology, annual or anniversary horoscopes, and the allocation of periods of life to planetary rulers. It provides evidence for the transmission of Sasanian astrological doctrines into Islamic astrology and, subsequently, medieval Latin astrology.

== Name ==
The name appears in several forms in the manuscript and scholarly traditions. David Pingree identified Zadanfarrukh as the scholar's personal name and Andarzgar as a title derived from Middle Persian handarzgar, meaning "adviser". The Middle Persian term andarzgar could also mean "counsellor" or "teacher" and was not exclusive to this astrologer. The Persian personal name Zadanfarrukh means "Born auspicious". Zadanfarrukh Andarzgar's name also appears in the Arabicized form Zadanfarrukh al-Andarzaghar.

== Historical background ==
Little is known about Zadanfarrukh Andarzgar's life, and his dates of birth and death are unknown. Pingree placed him within the Sasanian tradition of astrological scholarship.

During the Sasanian period, Greek and Indian astronomical and astrological writings were translated or adapted into Middle Persian. These works, together with Iranian traditions, formed a body of literature that later became an important source for astrologers writing in Arabic. The Middle Persian versions of works by Dorotheus of Sidon and Vettius Valens belonged to this transmission.

According to accounts reported by Ibn al-Qifti and Sa'id al-Andalusi, Zadanfarrukh Andarzgar particularly admired the ten books of Valens's Bizidaj.

== Works and transmission ==
Zadanfarrukh Andarzgar is associated with a work on nativities, cited in Arabic as Kitāb al-mawālīd (Book of Nativities). The title was a generic designation for works interpreting birth horoscopes and was also used by other astrologers. No complete Middle Persian text of his work survives.

An important collection of extracts is preserved in the Majmūʿ aqāwīl al-ḥukamāʾ, an astrological compilation assembled by al-Damaghani in the early twelfth century. Pingree identified parallels between these extracts and Book IV of the Liber Aristotelis, transmitted in the Latin translation of Hugh of Santalla. Other fragments correspond to material in Book III. Quotations also survive in a work on nativities by Sahl ibn Bishr.

Charles Burnett and Ahmed al-Hamdi collected, edited and translated material attributed to Zadanfarrukh Andarzgar in a study of his anniversary horoscopes published in 1991–1992.

== Astrological doctrines ==
=== Natal astrology and anniversary horoscopes ===
The writings attributed to Zadanfarrukh Andarzgar concern the interpretation of a person's birth horoscope and the prediction of subsequent events. Within natal astrology, the positions of the planets, zodiacal signs and houses at birth were interpreted as indications of a person's character and life. Anniversary horoscopes extended this interpretation to individual years.

An anniversary horoscope, also called a solar return or revolution of the years of a nativity, was calculated for the Sun's annual return to its position at birth. It was then considered in relation to the original natal horoscope. The material attributed to Zadanfarrukh Andarzgar combined annual revolutions with other predictive techniques, including profections, directions and planetary periods.

These procedures assigned different roles to planetary rulers. Among them was the lord of the year, a planet selected according to the rules of the relevant technique and treated as particularly significant for the interpretation of that year. Predictions also considered the planets, houses and astrological lots in the annual horoscope.

=== Planetary periods and firdaria ===
The surviving material includes the division of a person's life into periods and subperiods governed by different planets. One such system was firdaria, in which the seven traditional planets and the lunar nodes were assigned periods of rulership. The Sun and Moon were counted among the planets in this astrological classification.

Sections of the recovered text discuss the periods of the Sun, Venus, Mercury, the Moon, Saturn, Jupiter and Mars, as well as those of the dragon's head and tail, the traditional names for the ascending and descending lunar nodes. These periods were interpreted alongside other indications in the natal and anniversary horoscopes.

=== Directions and profections ===
Directions and profections provided additional methods of relating a birth horoscope to the passage of time. In directions, significant points in the horoscope were advanced according to specified astronomical or symbolic rules. In profections, successive years were associated with successive positions in the zodiac, bringing the ruler of the relevant sign into the interpretation.

Zadanfarrukh Andarzgar's material belongs to a tradition in which several methods were used together. The annual horoscope was therefore interpreted in conjunction with longer planetary periods and other techniques of timing.

=== Triplicity rulers ===
Later astrologers also attributed to Zadanfarrukh Andarzgar a method of interpreting the houses through their triplicity rulers. In this method, the three rulers of the triplicity associated with a house were assigned different aspects of that house's significations. An account of the method is preserved in the writings of Al-Qabisi.

== Historical significance ==
Zadanfarrukh Andarzgar's importance for the history of astrology rests primarily on the preservation of his doctrines by later authors. Since much of the Middle Persian astrological literature has been lost, Arabic quotations and translations are essential to reconstructing this tradition.

His writings illustrate the development of systems for interpreting successive years and periods of a person's life. These systems combined doctrines inherited from Greek astrology with developments in the Iranian tradition. Their survival in Arabic compilations and Latin translations makes the material attributed to him a source for studying the movement of astrological knowledge between late antiquity and the medieval Islamic and European worlds.

== See also ==
- Natal astrology
- Hellenistic astrology
- Astrology in the medieval Islamic world
- History of astrology
