= History of astrology =

Astrology is a belief in a relation between celestial observations and terrestrial events. People made conscious attempts to measure, record, and predict seasonal changes by reference to astronomical cycles. Early evidence of such practices appears as markings on bones and cave walls, which show that the lunar cycle was being noted as early as 25,000 years ago; the first step towards recording the Moon's influence upon tides and rivers, and towards organizing a communal calendar. With the Neolithic Revolution new needs were also being met by the increasing knowledge of constellations, whose appearances in the night-time sky change with the seasons, thus allowing the rising of particular star-groups to herald annual floods or seasonal activities. By the 3rd millennium BC, widespread civilisations had developed sophisticated understanding of celestial cycles, and are believed to have consciously oriented their temples to create alignment with the heliacal risings of the stars.

There is scattered evidence to suggest that the oldest known astrological references are copies of texts made during this period, particularly in Mesopotamia. Two, from the Venus tablet of Ammisaduqa (compiled in Babylon round 1700 BC) are reported to have been made during the reign of king Sargon of Akkad (2334–2279 BC). Another, showing an early use of electional astrology, is ascribed to the reign of the Sumerian ruler Gudea of Lagash (c. 2144–2124 BC). However, there is controversy over whether they were genuinely recorded at the time or merely ascribed to ancient rulers by posterity. The oldest undisputed evidence of the use of astrology as an integrated system of knowledge is attributed to records that emerge from the first dynasty of Mesopotamia (1950–1651 BC).

Among West Eurasian peoples, the earliest evidence for astrology dates from the 3rd millennium BC, with roots in calendrical systems used to predict seasonal shifts and to interpret celestial cycles as signs of divine communications. Until the 17th century, astrology was considered a scholarly tradition, and it helped drive the development of astronomy. It was commonly accepted in political and cultural circles, and some of its concepts were used in other traditional studies, such as alchemy, meteorology and medicine. By the end of the 17th century, emerging scientific concepts in astronomy, such as heliocentrism, undermined the theoretical basis of astrology, which subsequently lost its academic standing and became regarded as a pseudoscience. Empirical scientific investigation has shown that predictions based on these systems are not accurate.

In the 20th century, astrology gained broader consumer popularity through the influence of regular mass media products, such as newspaper horoscopes.

== Origins and trans-cultural transmission ==
Important foundations of astral divination and mathematical astronomy were developed in ancient Mesopotamia, particularly in Babylonia, where systematic celestial omens, planetary observations, and eventually horoscopic practices emerged from a long-established cuneiform scholarly tradition. During the Hellenistic period, Babylonian and Egyptian astral traditions interacted with Greek astronomy, mathematics, and philosophy, contributing to the development of the more systematized forms of Hellenistic astrology, including natal astrology.

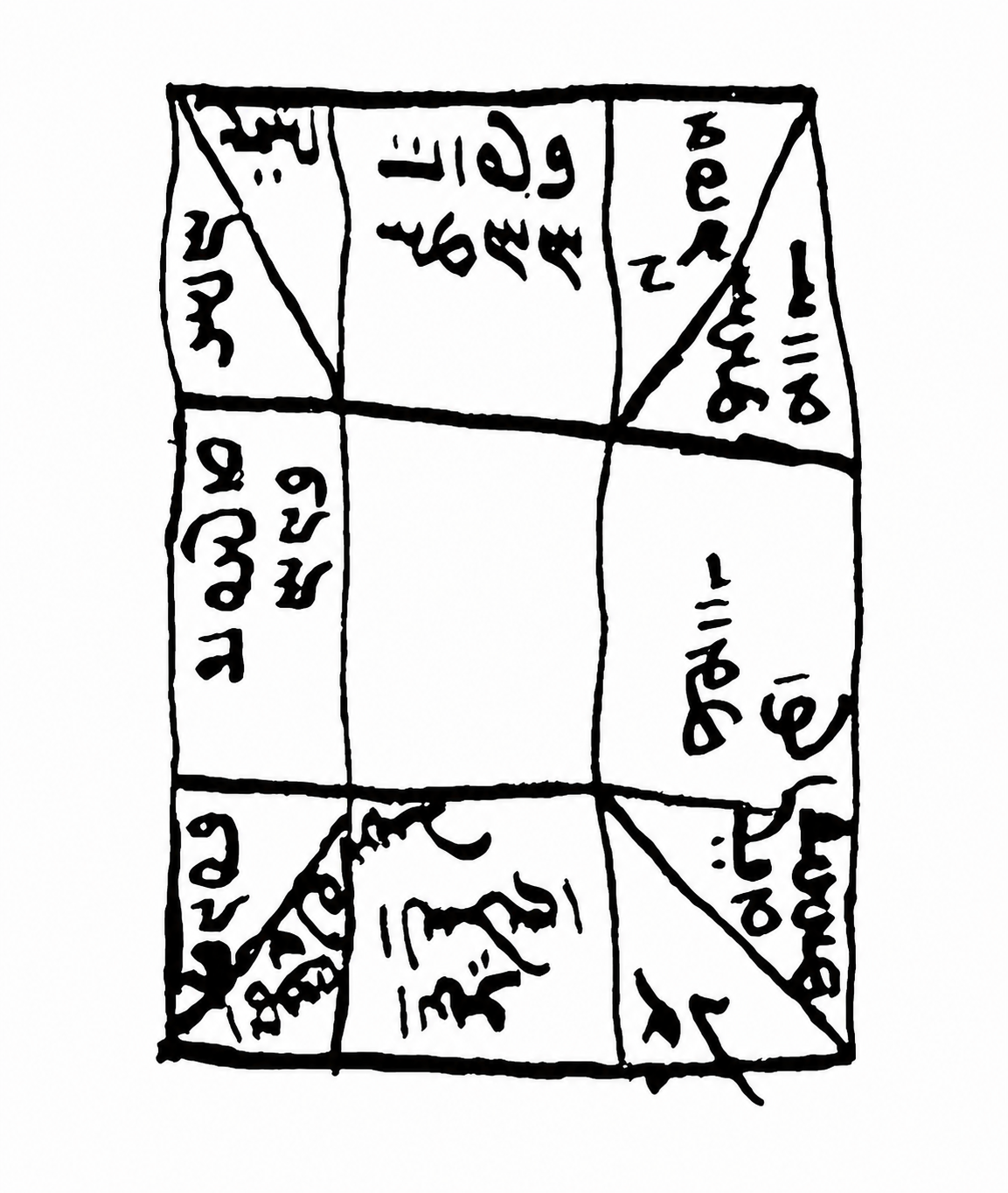
Diagram of the Zāyč ī gēhān (“Horoscope of the World”), based on a manuscript of the Middle Persian Bundahišn. It shows the astrological arrangement associated with the beginning of the material world in Zoroastrian cosmology.

These traditions continued to circulate and develop across the Middle East and South Asia rather than following a single west-to-east trajectory. In Sasanian Iran, Greek astronomical and astrological works were translated into Middle Persian alongside material of Indian origin, while earlier Mesopotamian traditions also remained influential. The resulting scholarly culture combined Greek, Mesopotamian, Iranian, and Indian elements. (See Persian astrology) Under the Abbasid Caliphate, this heterogeneous body of knowledge was translated, reorganized, and further developed in Arabic by scholars of diverse backgrounds, mostly Persian, and including Arab, Syriac Christian, and Jewish authors.

From the twelfth century onward, a substantial part of this Arabic-language astronomical and astrological literature was translated into Latin and became influential in medieval Western Europe. It is therefore more accurate to describe the history of astrology as a series of exchanges among Mesopotamian, Egyptian, Greek, Persian, Indian, and later Islamic scholarly traditions, rather than as a body of knowledge that originated exclusively in Greece, passed temporarily to the Islamic world, and was subsequently “returned” to Europe.

== Babylonian astrology ==
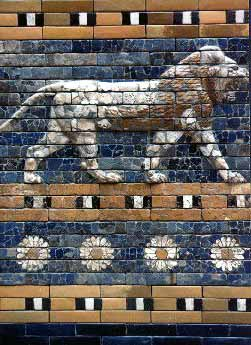
Detail of the Ishtar Gate in Babylon

Babylonian astrology is the earliest recorded organized system of astrology, arising in the 2nd millennium BC. There is speculation that astrology of some form appeared in the Sumerian period in the 3rd millennium BC, but the isolated references to ancient celestial omens dated to this period are not considered sufficient evidence to demonstrate an integrated theory of astrology. The history of scholarly celestial divination is therefore generally reported to begin with late Old Babylonian texts (c. 1800 BC), continuing through the Middle Babylonian and Middle Assyrian periods (c. 1200 BC).

By the 16th century BC, the extensive employment of omen-based astrology can be evidenced in the compilation of a comprehensive reference work known as Enuma Anu Enlil. Its contents consisted of 70 cuneiform tablets comprising 7,000 celestial omens. Texts from this time also refer to an oral tradition – the origin and content of which can only be speculated upon. At this time Babylonian astrology was solely mundane, concerned with the prediction of weather and political matters. Prior to the 7th century BC the practitioners' understanding of astronomy was fairly rudimentary. Astrological symbols likely represented seasonal tasks, and were used as a yearly almanac of listed activities to remind a community to do things appropriate to the season or weather (such as symbols representing times for harvesting, gathering shell-fish, fishing by net or line, sowing crops, collecting or managing water reserves, hunting, and seasonal tasks critical in ensuring the survival of children and young animals for the larger group). By the 4th century, their mathematical methods had progressed enough to calculate future planetary positions with reasonable accuracy, at which point extensive ephemerides began to appear.

Babylonian astrology developed within the context of divination. A collection of 32 tablets with inscribed liver models, dating from about 1875 BC, are the oldest known detailed texts of Babylonian divination, and these demonstrate the same interpretational format as that employed in celestial omen analysis. Blemishes and marks found on the liver of the sacrificial animal were interpreted as symbolic signs which presented messages from the gods to the king.

The gods were also believed to present themselves in the celestial images of the planets or stars with whom they were associated. Evil celestial omens attached to any particular planet were therefore seen as indications of dissatisfaction or disturbance of the god that planet represented. Such indications were met with attempts to appease the god and find manageable ways by which the god's expression could be realised without significant harm to the king and his nation. An astronomical report to the king Esarhaddon concerning a lunar eclipse of January 673 BC shows how the ritualistic use of substitute kings, or substitute events, combined an unquestioning belief in magic and omens with a purely mechanical view that the astrological event must have some kind of correlate within the natural world:

... In the beginning of the year a flood will come and break the dikes. When the Moon has made the eclipse, the king, my lord, should write to me. As a substitute for the king, I will cut through a dike, here in Babylonia, in the middle of the night. No one will know about it.

Ulla Koch-Westenholz, in her 1995 book Mesopotamian Astrology, argues that this ambivalence between a theistic and mechanic worldview defines the Babylonian concept of celestial divination as one which, despite its heavy reliance on magic, remains free of implications of targeted punishment with the purpose of revenge, and so "shares some of the defining traits of modern science: it is objective and value-free, it operates according to known rules, and its data are considered universally valid and can be looked up in written tabulations". Koch-Westenholz also establishes the most important distinction between ancient Babylonian astrology and other divinatory disciplines as being that the former was originally exclusively concerned with mundane astrology, being geographically oriented and specifically applied to countries, cities and nations, and almost wholly concerned with the welfare of the state and the king as the governing head of the nation. Mundane astrology is therefore known to be one of the oldest branches of astrology. It was only with the gradual emergence of horoscopic astrology, from the 6th century BC, that astrology developed the techniques and practice of natal astrology.

== Hellenistic Egypt ==
In 525 BC Egypt was conquered by the Persians so there is likely to have been some Mesopotamian influence on Egyptian astrology. Arguing in favour of this, historian Tamsyn Barton gives an example of what appears to be Mesopotamian influence on the Egyptian zodiac, which shared two signs – the Balance and the Scorpion, as evidenced in the Dendera Zodiac (in the Greek version the Balance was known as the Scorpion's Claws).

After the occupation by Alexander the Great in 332 BC, Egypt came under Hellenistic rule and influence. The city of Alexandria was founded by Alexander after the conquest and during the 3rd and 2nd centuries BC, the Ptolemaic scholars of Alexandria were prolific writers. It was in Ptolemaic Alexandria that Babylonian astrology was mixed with the Egyptian tradition of Decanic astrology to create Horoscopic astrology. This contained the Babylonian zodiac with its system of planetary exaltations, the triplicities of the signs and the importance of eclipses. Along with this it incorporated the Egyptian concept of dividing the zodiac into thirty-six decans of ten degrees each, with an emphasis on the rising decan, the Greek system of planetary Gods, sign rulership and four elements.

The decans were a system of time measurement according to the constellations. They were led by the constellation Sothis or Sirius. The risings of the decans in the night were used to divide the night into 'hours'. The rising of a constellation just before sunrise (its heliacal rising) was considered the last hour of the night. Over the course of the year, each constellation rose just before sunrise for ten days. When they became part of the astrology of the Hellenistic Age, each decan was associated with ten degrees of the zodiac. Texts from the 2nd century BC list predictions relating to the positions of planets in zodiac signs at the time of the rising of certain decans, particularly Sothis. The earliest Zodiac found in Egypt dates to the 1st century BC, the Dendera Zodiac.

Particularly important in the development of horoscopic astrology was the Greco-Roman astrologer and astronomer Ptolemy, who lived in Alexandria during Roman Egypt. Ptolemy's work the Tetrabiblos laid the basis of the Western astrological tradition, and as a source of later reference is said to have "enjoyed almost the authority of a Bible among the astrological writers of a thousand years or more". It was one of the first astrological texts to be circulated in Medieval Europe after being translated from Arabic into Latin by Plato of Tivoli (Tiburtinus) in Spain, 1138.

According to Firmicus Maternus (4th century), the system of horoscopic astrology was given early on to an Egyptian pharaoh named Nechepso and his priest Petosiris. The Hermetic texts were also put together during this period and Clement of Alexandria, writing in the Roman era, demonstrates the degree to which astrologers were expected to have knowledge of the texts in his description of Egyptian sacred rites:

This is principally shown by their sacred ceremonial. For first advances the Singer, bearing some one of the symbols of music. For they say that he must learn two of the books of Hermes, the one of which contains the hymns of the gods, the second the regulations for the king's life. And after the Singer advances the Astrologer, with a horologe in his hand, and a palm, the symbols of astrology. He must have the astrological books of Hermes, which are four in number, always in his mouth.

== Greece and Rome ==
The conquest of Asia by Alexander the Great exposed the Greeks to the cultures and cosmological ideas of Syria, Babylon, Persia and central Asia. Greek overtook cuneiform script as the international language of intellectual communication, and part of this process was the transmission of astrology from cuneiform to Greek. Sometime around 280 BC, Berossus, a priest of Bel from Babylon, moved to the Greek island of Kos in order to teach astrology and Babylonian culture to the Greeks. With this, what historian Nicholas Campion calls, "the innovative energy" in astrology moved west to the Hellenistic world of Greece and Egypt. According to Campion, the astrology that arrived from the Eastern World was marked by its complexity, with different forms of astrology emerging. By the 1st century BC two varieties of astrology were in existence, one that required the reading of horoscopes in order to establish precise details about the past, present and future; the other being theurgic (literally meaning 'god-work'), which emphasised the soul's ascent to the stars. While they were not mutually exclusive, the former sought information about the life, while the latter was concerned with personal transformation, where astrology served as a form of dialogue with the Divine.

As with much else, Greek influence played a crucial role in the transmission of astrological theory to Rome. However, our earliest references to demonstrate its arrival in Rome reveal its initial influence upon the lower orders of society, and display concern about uncritical recourse to the ideas of Babylonian 'star-gazers'. Among the Greeks and Romans, Babylonia (also known as Chaldea) became so identified with astrology that 'Chaldean wisdom' came to be a common synonym for divination using planets and stars.

The first definite reference to astrology comes from the work of the orator Cato, who in 160 BC composed a treatise warning farm overseers against consulting with Chaldeans. The 2nd-century Roman poet Juvenal, in his satirical attack on the habits of Roman women, also complains about the pervasive influence of Chaldeans, despite their lowly social status, saying "Still more trusted are the Chaldaeans; every word uttered by the astrologer they will believe has come from Hammon's fountain, ... nowadays no astrologer has credit unless he has been imprisoned in some distant camp, with chains clanking on either arm".

One of the first astrologers to bring Hermetic astrology to Rome was Thrasyllus, who, in the first century AD, acted as the astrologer for the emperor Tiberius. Tiberius was the first emperor reported to have had a court astrologer, although his predecessor Augustus had also used astrology to help legitimise his Imperial rights. In the second century AD, the astrologer Claudius Ptolemy was so obsessed with getting horoscopes accurate that he began the first attempt to make an accurate world map (maps before this were more relativistic or allegorical) so that he could chart the relationship between the person's birthplace and the heavenly bodies. While doing so, he coined the term "geography".

Even though some use of astrology by the emperors appears to have happened, there was also a prohibition on astrology to a certain extent as well. In the 1st century AD, Publius Anteius Rufus was accused of the crime of funding the banished astrologer Pammenes, and requesting his own horoscope and that of then emperor Nero. For this crime, Nero forced Anteius to commit suicide. At this time, astrology was likely to result in charges of magic and treason.

Cicero's De divinatione (44 BC), which rejects astrology and other allegedly divinatory techniques, is a fruitful historical source for the conception of scientificity in Roman classical Antiquity. The Pyrrhonist philosopher Sextus Empiricus compiled the ancient arguments against astrology in his book Against the Astrologers.

== Islamic world ==
Abū Maʿshar
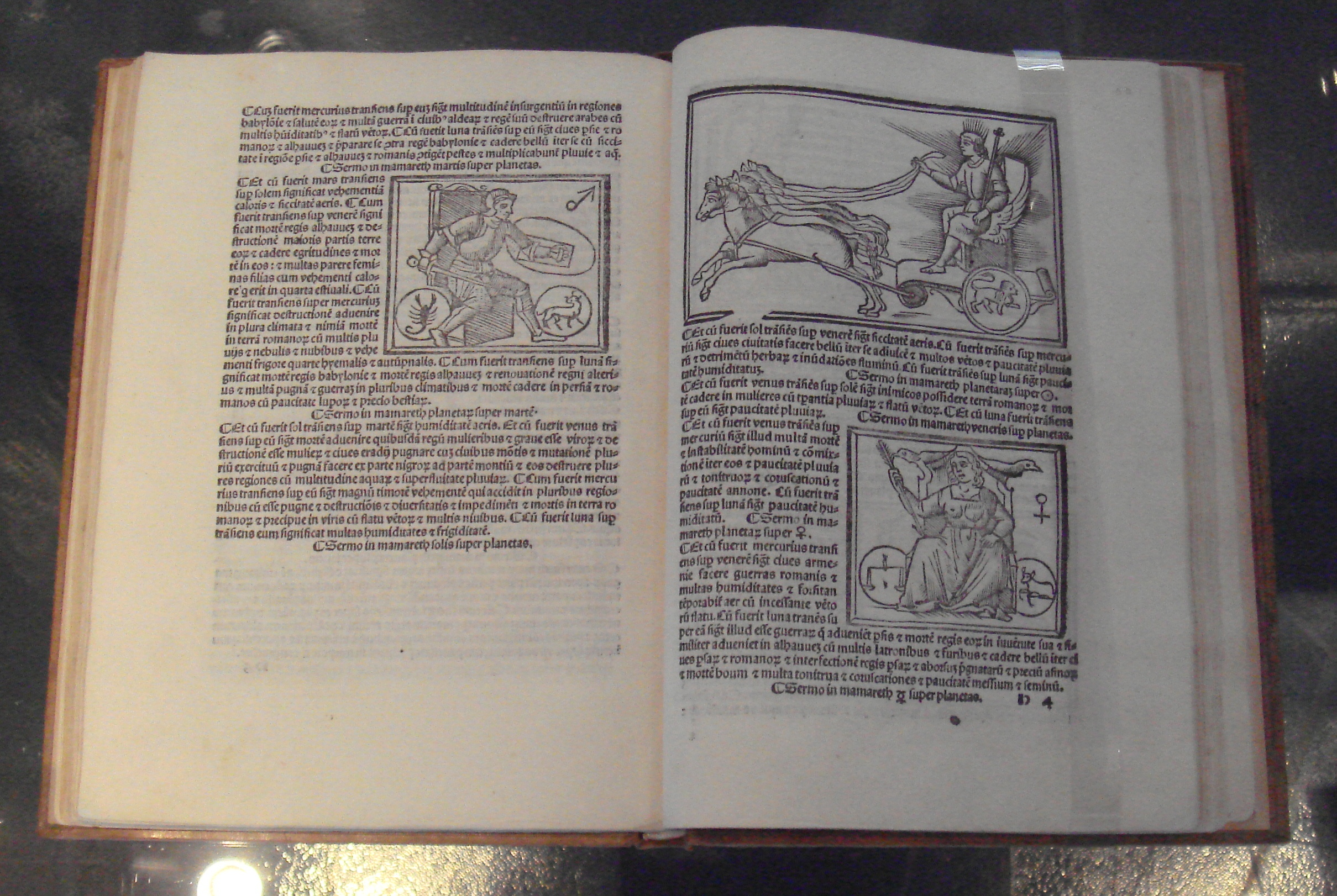
- A Latin translation of Abū Maʿshar's De Magnis Coniunctionibus ("Of the great conjunctions"), Venice, 1515.
- Born: c. 787; Balkh, Khurasan
- Died: c. 886; Wāsiṭ, Iraq

Academic background
- Influences: Aristotle, al-Kindi

Academic work
- Era: Islamic Golden Age
- Main interests: Astrology, Astronomy
- Influenced: Al-Sijzi, Albertus Magnus, Roger Bacon, Pierre d'Ailly, Pico della Mirandola.

Astrology was taken up enthusiastically by Islamic scholars following the collapse of Alexandria to the Arabs in the 7th century, and the founding of the Abbasid empire in the 8th century. The second Abbasid caliph, Al Mansur (754–775) founded the city of Baghdad to act as a centre of learning, and included in its design a library-translation centre known as Bayt al-Hikma 'Storehouse of Wisdom', which continued to receive development from his heirs and was to provide a major impetus for Arabic translations of Hellenistic astrological texts. The early translators included the Persian Jewish astrologer Mashallah, who helped to elect the time for the foundation of Baghdad, and Sahl ibn Bishr (a.k.a. Zael), whose texts were directly influential upon later European astrologers such as Guido Bonatti in the 13th century, and William Lilly in the 17th century. Knowledge of Arabic texts started to become imported into Europe during the Latin translations of the 12th century.

In the 9th century, Persian astrologer Albumasar was thought to be one of the greatest astrologers at that time. His practical manuals for training astrologers profoundly influenced Muslim intellectual history and, through translations, that of western Europe and Byzantium In the 10th century. Albumasar's Introductorium in Astronomiam was one of the most important sources for the recovery of Aristotle for medieval European scholars. Another was the Persian mathematician, astronomer, astrologer and geographer Al Khwarizmi. The Arabs greatly increased the knowledge of astronomy, and many of the star names that are commonly known today, such as Aldebaran, Altair, Betelgeuse, Rigel and Vega retain the legacy of their language. They also developed the list of Hellenistic lots to the extent that they became historically known as Arabic parts, for which reason it is often wrongly claimed that the Arabic astrologers invented their use, whereas they are clearly known to have been an important feature of Hellenistic astrology.

During the advance of Islamic science, some of the practices of astrology were refuted on theological grounds by astronomers such as Al-Farabi (Alpharabius), Ibn al-Haytham (Alhazen) and Avicenna. Their criticisms argued that the methods of astrologers were conjectural rather than empirical, and conflicted with orthodox religious views of Islamic scholars through the suggestion that the Will of God can be precisely known and predicted in advance. Such refutations mainly concerned 'judicial branches' (such as horary astrology), rather than the more 'natural branches' such as medical and meteorological astrology, these being seen as part of the natural sciences of the time.

For example, Avicenna's 'Refutation against astrology' Resāla fī ebṭāl aḥkām al-nojūm, argues against the practice of astrology while supporting the principle of planets acting as the agents of divine causation which express God's absolute power over creation. Avicenna considered that the movement of the planets influenced life on earth in a deterministic way, but argued against the capability of determining the exact influence of the stars. In essence, Avicenna did not refute the essential dogma of astrology, but denied our ability to understand it to the extent that precise and fatalistic predictions could be made from it.

== Medieval and Renaissance Europe ==
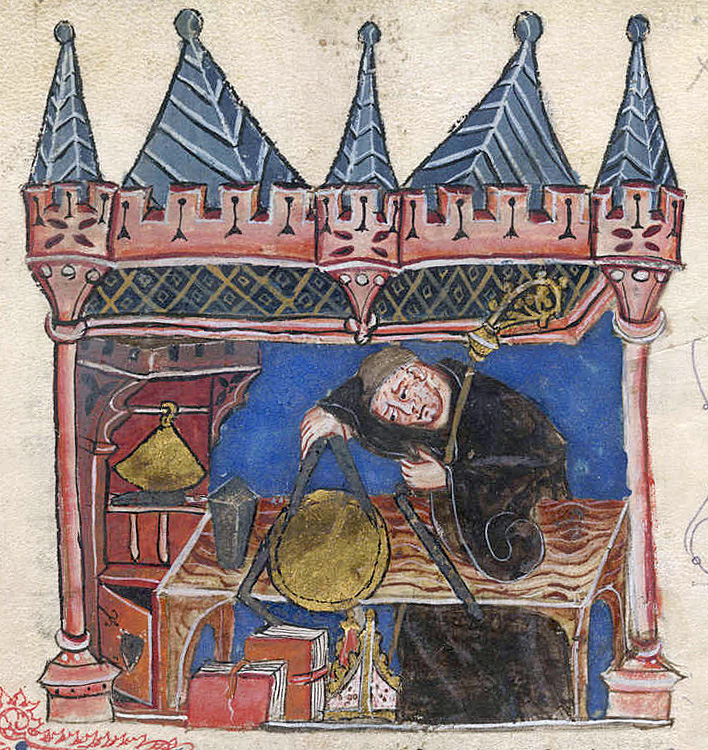
Astrologer-astronomer Richard of Wallingford is shown measuring an equatorium with a pair of compasses in this 14th-century work.

While astrology in the East flourished following the break up of the Roman world, with Indian, Persian and Islamic influences coming together and undergoing intellectual review through an active investment in translation projects, Western astrology in the same period had become "fragmented and unsophisticated ... partly due to the loss of Greek scientific astronomy and partly due to condemnations by the Church." Translations of Arabic works into Latin started to make their way to Spain by the late 10th century, and in the 12th century the transmission of astrological works from Arabia to Europe "acquired great impetus".

By the 13th century astrology had become a part of everyday medical practice in Europe. Doctors combined Galenic medicine (inherited from the Greek physiologist Galen - AD 129–216) with studies of the stars. By the end of the 1500s, physicians across Europe were required by law to calculate the position of the Moon before carrying out complicated medical procedures, such as surgery or bleeding.

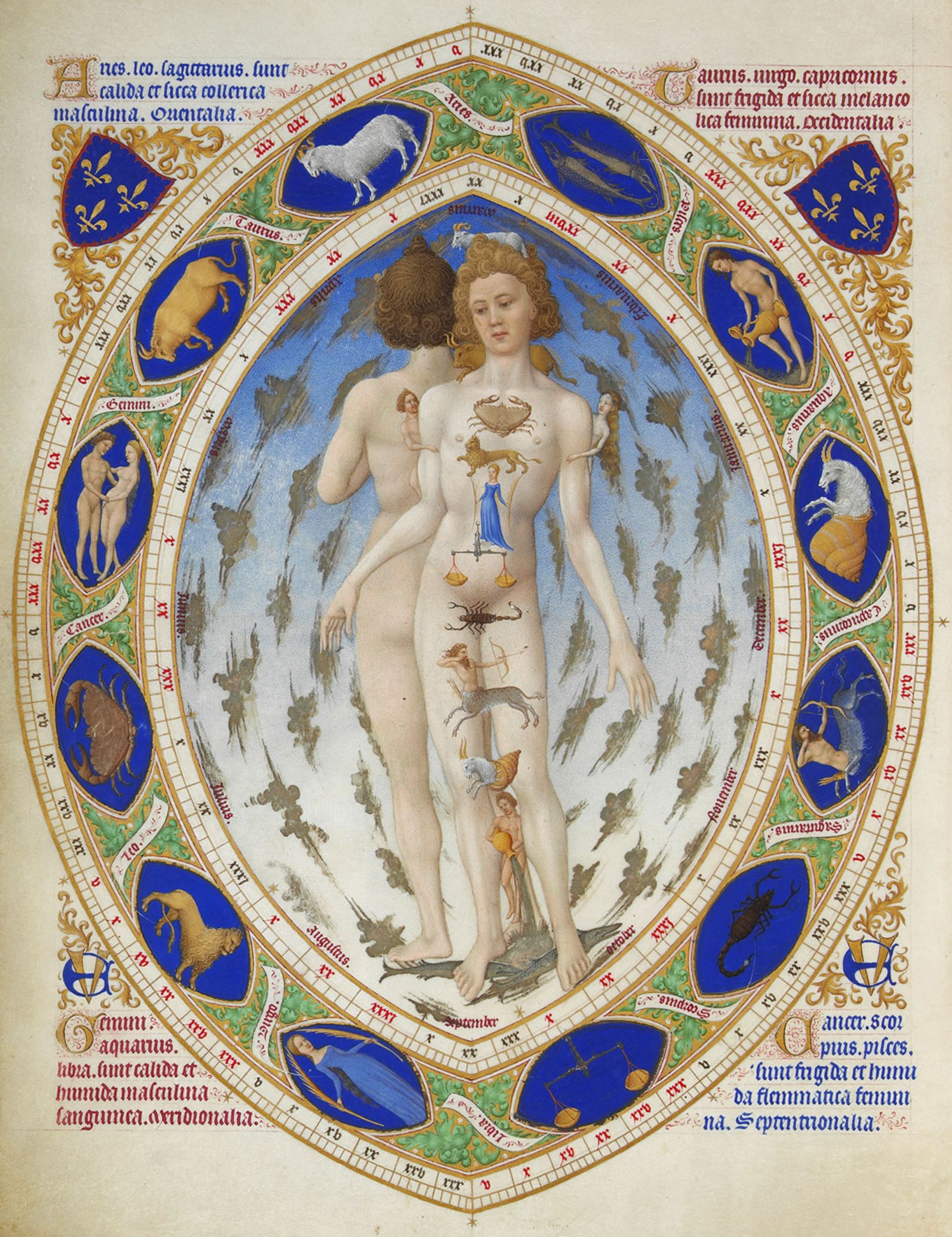
An image related to astrology from the Très Riches Heures du Duc de Berry. It shows the purported relation between body parts and the signs of the zodiac.

Influential works of the 13th century include those of the British monk Johannes de Sacrobosco (c. 1195–1256) and the Italian astrologer Guido Bonatti from Forlì (Italy). Bonatti served the communal governments of Florence, Siena and Forlì and acted as advisor to Frederick II, Holy Roman Emperor. His astrological text-book Liber Astronomiae ('Book of Astronomy'), written around 1277, was reputed to be "the most important astrological work produced in Latin in the 13th century". Dante Alighieri immortalised Bonatti in his Divine Comedy (early 14th century) by placing him in the eighth Circle of Hell, a place where those who would divine the future are forced to have their heads turned around (to look backwards instead of forwards).

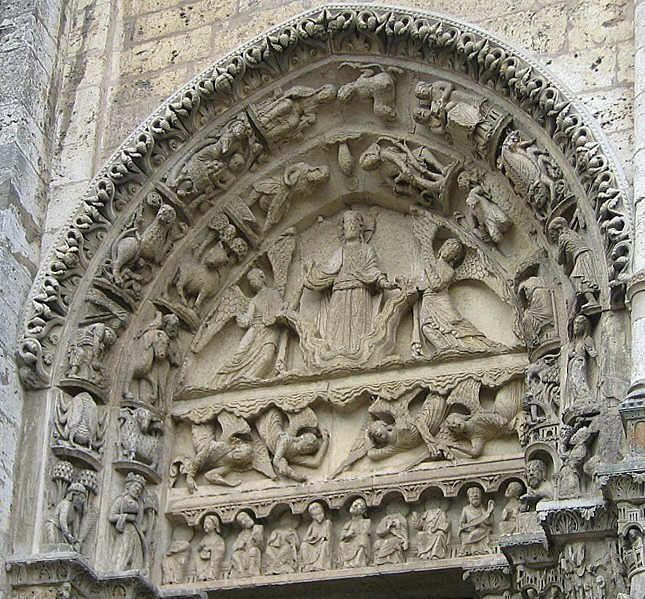
Ascension tympanum of Royal Portal of Chartres Cathedral. The central theme is Christ's ascension, but around the edges are the signs of the Zodiac and the Labours of the Months.

In medieval Europe, a university education was divided into seven distinct areas, each represented by a particular planet and known as the seven liberal arts. Dante attributed these arts to the planets. As the arts were seen as operating in ascending order, so were the planets in decreasing order of planetary speed: grammar was assigned to the Moon, the quickest moving celestial body, dialectic was assigned to Mercury, rhetoric to Venus, music to the Sun, arithmetic to Mars, geometry to Jupiter and astrology/astronomy to the slowest moving body, Saturn.

Medieval writers used astrological symbolism in their literary themes. For example, Dante's Divine Comedy builds varied references to planetary associations within his described architecture of Hell, Purgatory and Paradise, (such as the seven layers of Purgatory's mountain purging the seven cardinal sins that correspond to astrology's seven classical planets). Similar astrological allegories and planetary themes are pursued through the works of Geoffrey Chaucer.

Chaucer's astrological passages are particularly frequent and knowledge of astrological basics is often assumed through his work. He knew enough of his period's astrology and astronomy to write a Treatise on the Astrolabe for his son. He pinpoints the early spring season of the Canterbury Tales in the opening verses of the prologue by noting that the Sun "hath in the Ram his halfe cours yronne". He makes the Wife of Bath refer to "sturdy hardiness" as an attribute of Mars, and associates Mercury with "clerkes". In the early modern period, astrological references are also to be found in the works of William Shakespeare and John Milton.

One of the earliest English astrologers to leave details of his practice was Richard Trewythian (b. 1393). His notebook demonstrates that he had a wide range of clients, from all walks of life, and indicates that engagement with astrology in 15th-century England was not confined to those within learned, theological or political circles.

During the Renaissance, court astrologers would complement their use of horoscopes with astronomical observations and discoveries. Many individuals now credited with having overturned the old astrological order, such as Tycho Brahe, Galileo Galilei and Johannes Kepler, were themselves practicing astrologers.

At the end of the Renaissance the confidence placed in astrology diminished, with the breakdown of Aristotelian Physics and rejection of the distinction between the celestial and sublunar realms, which had historically acted as the foundation of astrological theory. Keith Thomas writes that although heliocentrism is consistent with astrology theory, 16th and 17th century astronomical advances meant that "the world could no longer be envisaged as a compact inter-locking organism; it was now a mechanism of infinite dimensions, from which the hierarchical subordination of earth to heaven had irrefutably disappeared". Initially, amongst the astronomers of the time, "scarcely anyone attempted a serious refutation in the light of the new principles" and in fact astronomers "were reluctant to give up the emotional satisfaction provided by a coherent and interrelated universe". By the 18th century the intellectual investment which had previously maintained astrology's standing was largely abandoned. Historian of science Ann Geneva writes:

Astrology in seventeenth century England was not a science. It was not a Religion. It was not magic. Nor was it astronomy, mathematics, puritanism, neo Platism, psychology, meteorology, alchemy or witchcraft. It used some of these as tools; it held tenets in common with others; and some people were adept at several of these skills. But in the final analysis it was only itself: a unique divinatory and prognostic art embodying centuries of accreted methodology and tradition.

== Medieval Jewish astrology ==
Astrology was a subject of significant interest among medieval Jews, and astrological ideas appear across various areas of Jewish thought. Although often treated alongside astronomy, astrology was typically viewed as a separate field, less certain in its conclusions but grounded in long-standing empirical observations. It was widely accepted that celestial bodies could influence the sublunar world, though disagreements persisted over how reliably astrologers could interpret these effects.

Jewish scholars responded in various ways, with 12th century rabbi, physician and philosopher Maimonides famously rejecting astrology outright, while others debated its scientific and theological validity. Saadia Gaon, who lived in Babylonia in the 10th century, criticized some forms of astrological prognostication but also incorporated astrology into his commentary on Sefer Yetzirah. Sherira Gaon and Hai Gaon addressed specific astrological topics in their responsa, and 10th century astronomer Dunash ibn Tamim both drew on astrological concepts in his commentary on Genesis and wrote a separate treatise critiquing the foundations of judicial astrology. Astrological materials circulated widely in medieval Jewish communities, especially in the Mediterranean. Fragments from the Cairo Geniza reveal Jewish engagement with horoscopes, calendars of favorable and unfavorable days, and astrological guidance on topics like health, agriculture, weather, political events, and epidemics. Many texts were in Hebrew, Judeo-Arabic, or Palestinian Jewish Aramaic and derived from Greek sources translated in Byzantine or early Islamic contexts.

The most important Jewish astrologer of the medieval period was Abraham Ibn Ezra (1089–1164), born in Tudela, Spain under Muslim rule. Although he composed most of his astrological writings after leaving al-Andalus, they reflect strong influence from Arabic traditions. Ibn Ezra authored a large, structured corpus including Reshit Ḥokhmah, Mishpeṭei ha-Mazalot, and Sefer ha-Te'amim (introductions to theory); Sefer ha-Mivḥarim (on choosing the right time for actions); Sefer ha-She’elot (on answering life questions through horoscopes); Sefer ha-'Olam (on historical and weather prediction); and Sefer ha-Me'orot (on medical astrology). He also wrote on mathematical theory and the astrolabe. His works show an encyclopedic structure, composed primarily in southern and northern France between 1148 and 1154, with frequent internal cross-references.

== India ==
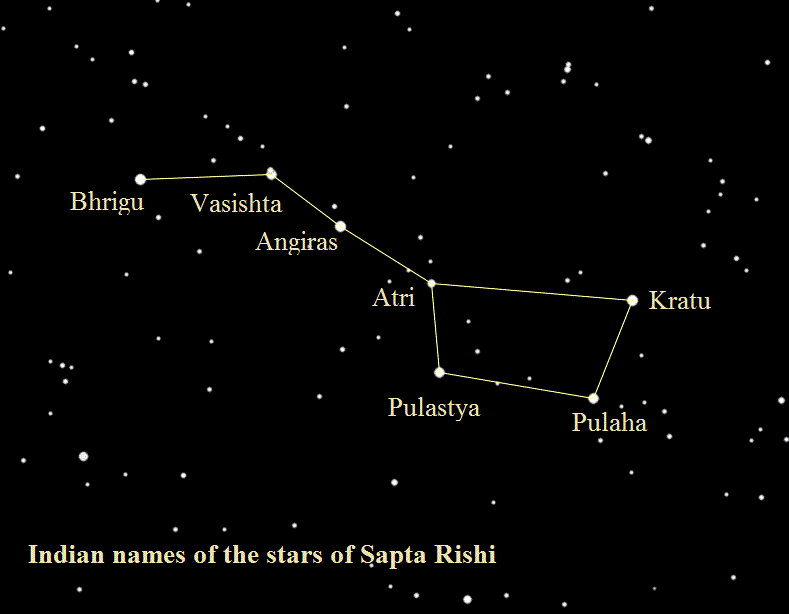
In traditional Hindu astronomy, seven stars of Ursa Major identified with the names of Saptarshis.

The earliest recorded use of astrology in India is recorded during the Vedic period. Astrology, or jyotiṣa is listed as a Vedanga, or branch of the Vedas of the Vedic religion. The only work of this class to have survived is the Vedanga Jyotisha, which contains rules for tracking the motions of the sun and the moon in the context of a five-year intercalation cycle. The date of this work is uncertain, as its late style of language and composition, consistent with the last centuries BC, albeit pre-Mauryan, conflicts with some internal evidence of a much earlier date in the 2nd millennium BC. Indian astronomy and astrology developed together. The earliest treatise on Jyotisha, the Bhrigu Samhita, was compiled by the sage Bhrigu during the Vedic era. The sage Bhirgu is also called the 'Father of Hindu Astrology', and is one of the venerated Saptarishi or seven Vedic sages. The Saptarishis are also symbolized by the seven main stars in the Ursa Major constellation.

The documented history of Jyotisha in the subsequent newer sense of modern horoscopic astrology is associated with the interaction of Indian and Hellenistic cultures through the Greco-Bactrian and Indo-Greek Kingdoms. The oldest surviving treatises, such as the Yavanajataka or the Brihat-Samhita, date to the early centuries AD. The oldest astrological treatise in Sanskrit is the Yavanajataka ("Sayings of the Greeks"), a versification by Sphujidhvaja in 269/270 AD of a now lost translation of a Greek treatise by Yavanesvara during the 2nd century AD under the patronage of the Indo-Scythian king Rudradaman I of the Western Satraps.

Written on pages of tree bark, the Samhita (Compilation) is said to contain five million horoscopes comprising all who have lived in the past or will live in the future. The first named authors writing treatises on astronomy are from the 5th century AD, the date when the classical period of Indian astronomy can be said to begin. Besides the theories of Aryabhata in the Aryabhatiya and the lost Arya-siddhānta, there is the Pancha-Siddhāntika of Varahamihira.

== China ==
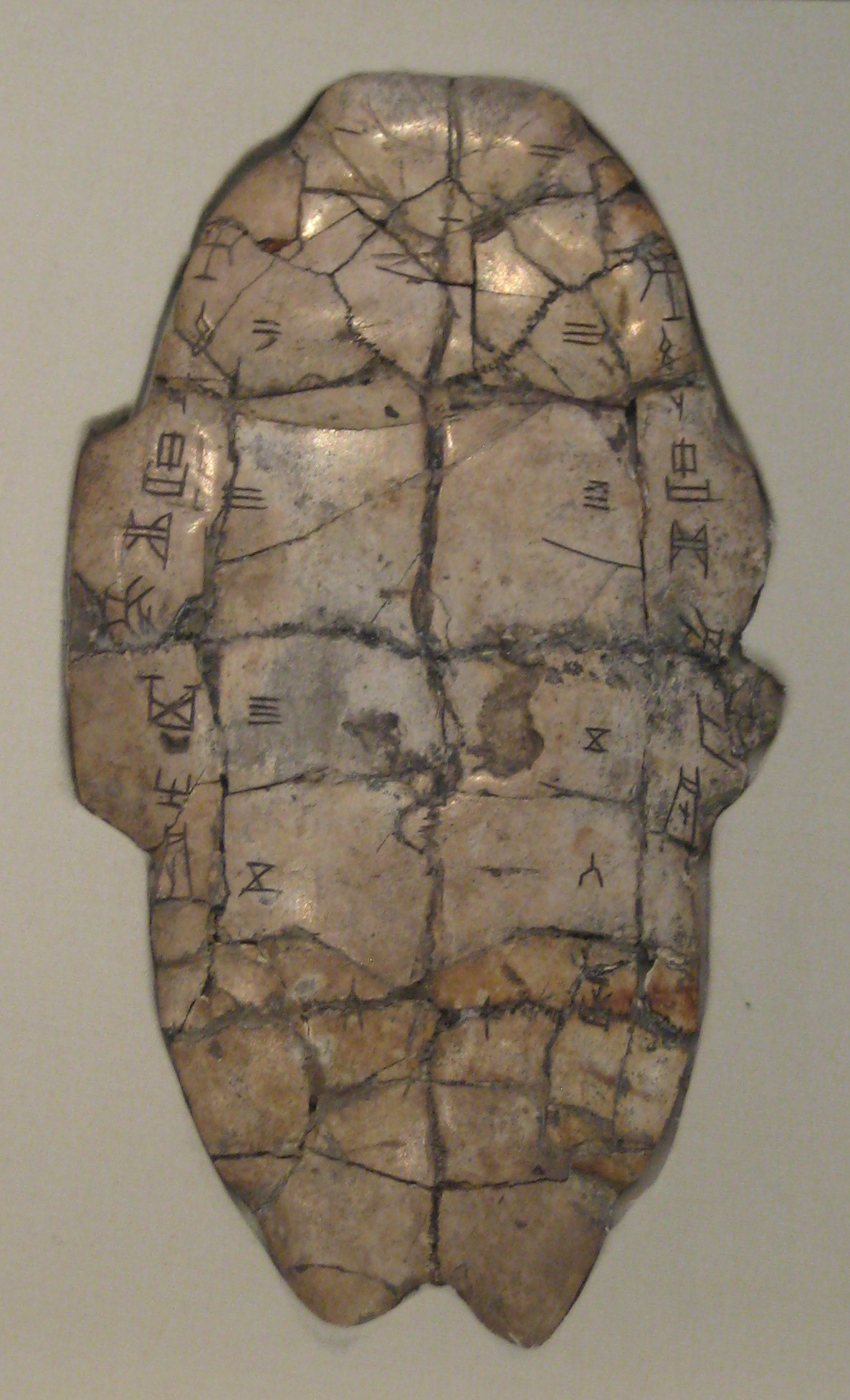
An oracle bone – turtle shell

The Chinese astrological system is based on native astronomy and calendars, and its significant development is tied to that of native astronomy, which came to flourish during the Han dynasty (2nd century BC – 2nd century AD).

Chinese astrology has a close relation with Chinese philosophy (theory of three harmonies: heaven, earth and water) and uses the principles of yin and yang, and concepts that are not found in Western astrology, such as the wu xing teachings, the 10 Celestial stems, the 12 Earthly Branches, the lunisolar calendar (moon calendar and sun calendar), and the time calculation after year, month, day and shichen (時辰).

Astrology was traditionally regarded highly in China, and Confucius is said to have treated astrology with respect saying: "Heaven sends down its good or evil symbols and wise men act accordingly". The 60-year cycle combining the five elements with the twelve animal signs of the zodiac has been documented in China since at least the time of the Shang (Shing or Yin) dynasty (c. 1766 BC – c. 1050 BC). Oracle bones have been found dating from that period with the date according to the 60-year cycle inscribed on them, along with the name of the diviner and the topic being divined. Astrologer Tsou Yen lived around 300 BC, and wrote: "When some new dynasty is going to arise, heaven exhibits auspicious signs for the people".

There is debate as to whether the Babylonian astrology influenced early development of Chinese astrology. Later in the 6th century, the translation of the Mahāsaṃnipāta Sūtra brought the Babylonian system to China. Though it did not displace Chinese astrology, it was referenced in several poems.

== Mesoamerica ==
The calendars of Pre-Columbian Mesoamerica are based upon a system which had been in common use throughout the region, dating back to at least the 6th century BC. The earliest calendars were employed by peoples such as the Zapotecs and Olmecs, and later by such peoples as the Maya, Mixtec and Aztecs. Although the Mesoamerican calendar did not originate with the Maya, their subsequent extensions and refinements to it were the most sophisticated. Along with those of the Aztecs, the Maya calendars are the best-documented and most completely understood.

The distinctive Mayan calendar used two main systems, one plotting the solar year of 360 days, which governed the planting of crops and other domestic matters; the other called the Tzolkin of 260 days, which governed ritual use. Each was linked to an elaborate astrological system to cover every facet of life. On the fifth day after the birth of a boy, the Mayan astrologer-priests would cast his horoscope to see what his profession was to be: soldier, priest, civil servant or sacrificial victim. A 584-day Venus cycle was also maintained, which tracked the appearance and conjunctions of Venus. Venus was seen as a generally inauspicious and baleful influence, and Mayan rulers often planned the beginning of warfare to coincide with when Venus rose. There is evidence that the Maya also tracked the movements of Mercury, Mars and Jupiter, and possessed a zodiac of some kind. The Mayan name for the constellation Scorpio was also 'scorpion', while the name of the constellation Gemini was 'peccary'. There is some evidence for other constellations being named after various beasts. The most famous Mayan astrological observatory still intact is the Caracol observatory in the ancient Mayan city of Chichen Itza in modern-day Mexico.

The Aztec calendar shares the same basic structure as the Mayan calendar, with two main cycles of 360 days and 260 days. The 260-day calendar was called Tonalpohualli and was used primarily for divinatory purposes. Like the Mayan calendar, these two cycles formed a 52-year 'century', sometimes called the Calendar Round.

== See also ==
- Astrology and science
- Classical planets in Western alchemy
- Jewish views on astrology
- List of astrological traditions, types, and systems
- Worship of heavenly bodies

== Sources ==
- Al Biruni (11th century), The Chronology of Ancient Nations; tr. C. E. Sachau. London: W.H Allen & Co, 1879. Online edition available on the Internet Archive, retrieved 6 August 2011.
- Barton, Tamsyn, 1994. Ancient Astrology. Routledge. ISBN 0-415-11029-7.
- Belo, Catarina, 2007. Chance and determinism in Avicenna and Averroës. London: Brill. ISBN 90-04-15587-2.
- Burckhardt, Titus, 1969. 'The Seven Liberal Arts and the West Door of Chartres Cathedral' Studies in Comparative Religion, Vol. 3, No. 3 (Summer, 1969). (Online reproduction), retrieved 4 July 2012.
- Campion, Nicholas, 2008. A History of Western Astrology, Vol. 1, The Ancient World (first published as The Dawn of Astrology: a Cultural History of Western Astrology. London: Continuum. ISBN 9781441181299.
- Nicholas Campion, A History of Western Astrology Vol. 2, The Medieval and Modern Worlds, Continuum 2009. ISBN 978-1-84725-224-1.
- Crane, Joseph, 2012. Between Fortune and Providence: Astrology and the Universe in Dante's Divine Comedy. Wessex. ISBN 9781902405759.
- Maternus, Julius Firmicus, 4th century. Matheseos libri VIII . Translated by Jean Rhys Bram in Ancient astrology theory and practice, Noyes Press, 1975. Reprinted by Astrology Center of America, 2005. ISBN 978-1-933303-10-9.
- Hesiod (c. 8th century BC) . Hesiod, the Homeric Hymns, and Homerica translated by Evelyn-White, Hugh G., 1914. Loeb classical library; revised edition. Cambridge: Harvard Press, 1964. ISBN 978-0-674-99063-0.
- Kelley, David, H. and Milone, E.F., 2005. Exploring ancient skies: an encyclopedic survey of archaeoastronomy. Heidelberg / New York: Springer. ISBN 978-0-387-95310-6.
- Holden, James Herschel, 1996. A History of Horoscopic Astrology. AFA. ISBN 978-0-86690-463-6.
- Houlding, Deborah, 2010. Essays on the history of western astrology. Nottingham: STA.
- Koch-Westenholz, Ulla, 1995. Mesopotamian astrology. Volume 19 of CNI publications. Museum Tusculanum Press. ISBN 978-87-7289-287-0.
- Marshack, Alexander, 1972. The roots of civilisation: the cognitive beginnings of man's first art, symbol and notation. London: Weidenfeld & Nicolson. ISBN 978-1-55921-041-6.
- Neugebauer, Otto, 1969 The Exact Sciences in Antiquity. New York: Dover. ISBN 978-0-48622-332-2.
- Parker, Derek and Julia, 1983. A history of astrology. Deutsch. ISBN 978-0-233-97576-4.
- Pingree, David Edwin, 1997. From astral omens to astrology: from Babylon to Bīnāker. Istituto italiano per l'Africa et l'Oriente (Serie orientale Roma).
- Robbins, Frank E. (ed.) 1940. Ptolemy Tetrabiblos. Cambridge, Massachusetts: Harvard University Press (Loeb Classical Library). ISBN 0-674-99479-5.
- Roberts, Reverend Alexander (translator) 1906. The Ante-Nicene Fathers: The Writings of the Fathers Down to AD 325, Volume II - Fathers of the Second Century - Hermas, Tatian, Theophilus, Athenagoras, Clement of Alexandria. W. B. Eerdmans Pub. Co. Republished: Cosimo, Inc., 2007. ISBN 978-1-60206-471-3).
- Rochberg, Francesca, 1998. Babylonian Horoscopes. American Philosophical Society. ISBN 0-87169-881-1.
- Saliba, George, 1994. A History of Arabic astronomy: planetary theories during the Golden Age of Islam. New York University Press. ISBN 0-8147-7962-X.
- Yamamoto, Keiji (2007). "Abū Maʿshar Jaʿfar ibn Muḥammad ibn ʿUmar al-Balkhi". In Thomas Hockey; et al. (eds.). The Biographical Encyclopedia of Astronomers. New York: Springer. p. 11. ISBN 978-0-387-31022-0. (PDF version)
