= Steven Forrest (astrologer) =

American astrologer, writer, and lecturer

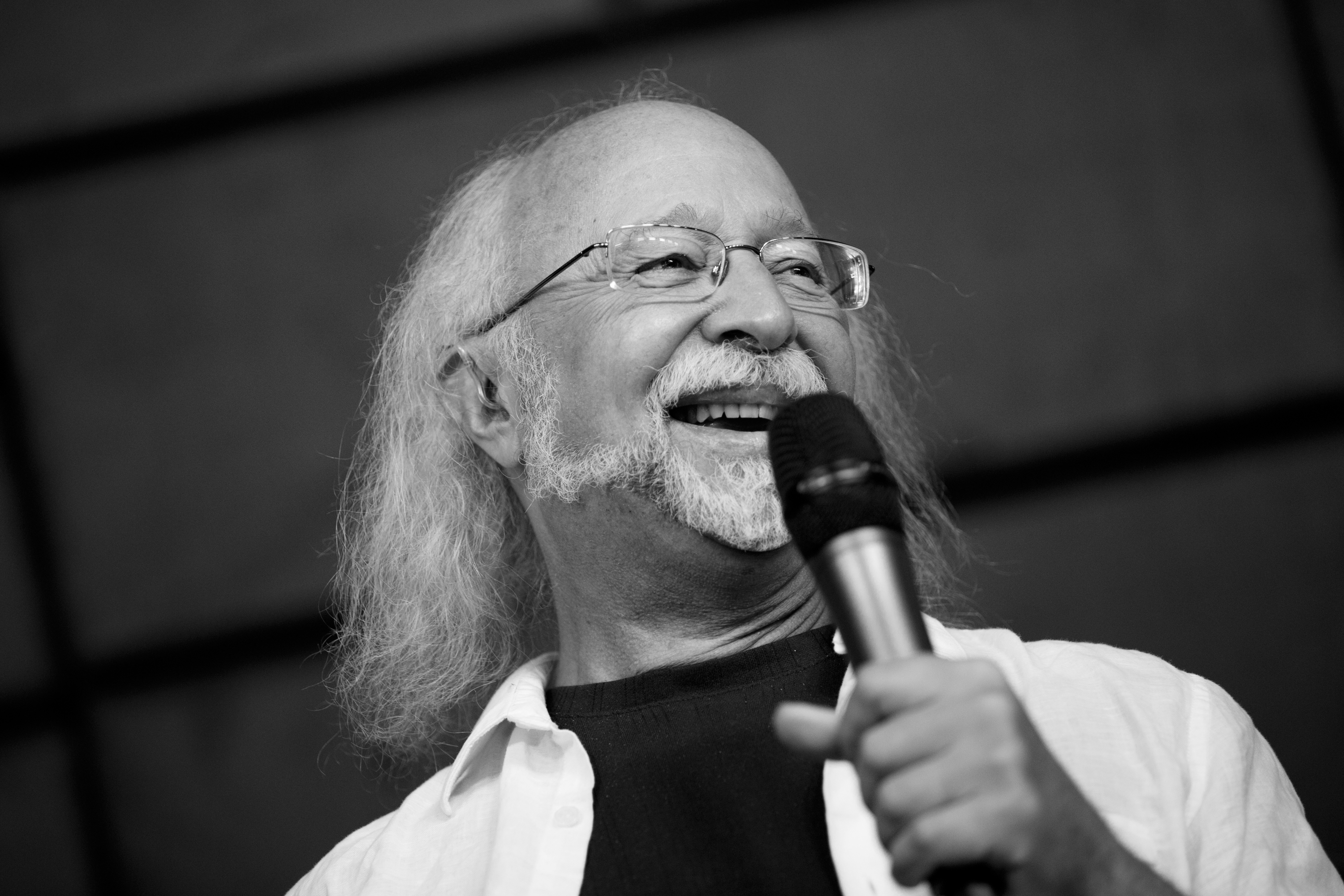
- Born: January 6, 1949 (age 77); Mount Vernon, New York, United States
- Occupations: Astrologer, lecturer, writer
- Years active: 1976–present

Steven Forrest (born January 6, 1949) is an American astrologer, writer, and lecturer. He is the author of nearly a dozen astrological books and one of the founders of the school of Evolutionary Astrology, described by Forrest as "a form of psychological astrology which is integrated with metaphysics. Where a twentieth century psychological astrologer might focus on the dynamics of childhood, the evolutionary astrologer focuses on the childhood of the soul—prior lifetimes, and the issues left unresolved from them."

Since 1998 Forrest has taught students via apprenticeship programs in Northern and Southern California, North Carolina, Italy, Switzerland and Australia. He has also taught at the Omega Institute for Holistic Studies, The New York Open Center, and the Marion Foundation as well as addressed the Fellows at Andrew Weil's Arizona Center for Integrative Medicine at the University of Arizona Medical Center in Tucson.

== Biography ==
Forrest was born on January 6, 1949, in Mount Vernon, New York. He graduated with a B.A. in Religion from the University of North Carolina at Chapel Hill in 1971.

Forrest began practicing astrology professionally in 1976 and in 1981 was asked by Bantam Books to write his first book, The Inner Sky. Published the following year, it was greeted with positive reviews from The Los Angeles Times and Esquire magazine which called it a "truly outstanding" book that is "intelligent, well-written and actually fun." Astrologer April Kent said of Forrest's The Inner Sky, "If I could have one astrology book with me on a deserted island, this would be it." It was also praised by the musician Sting, who said that Forrest "manages to disarm the skeptic, as well as debunk the charlatanism that surrounds popular astrology, with language that is as intelligent and cogent as it is poetic."

Forrest has served on the Ethics Committee for the International Society for Astrological Research, as well as the Chair of the Kepler College Advisory Council. In 1985 he won the Professional Astrologers Incorporated Award for "Outstanding Contribution to the Art and Science of Astrology," and in 1992, 1995, and 2008 was nominated for a United Astrology Congress Regulus Award.

In the mid-1980s Steven wrote the monthly horoscopes for Elle magazine.

Jungian analyst Robert A. Johnson proclaimed that Forrest's reading of his astrological birth chart was "one of the greatest events of my life. . . you have restored the divine art to its noble status."

== Evolutionary astrology ==
Forrest practices what he calls Evolutionary Astrology, a term that he used in his 1984 book, The Inner Sky. Raymond Merriman originally coined the term in his 1977 limited edition book Evolutionary Astrology, and the term was also popularized by Jeffrey Wolf Green in his 1985 book, Pluto: The Evolutionary Journey of the Soul (Forrest and Green together were nicknamed "The Pluto Brothers"). While the techniques of these three astrologers are distinctly unique, they all assume that the present birth chart derives from conditions experienced in prior lifetimes. Other astrological writers in the same period, such as Stephen Arroyo, A. T. Mann and Martin Schulman, also explored similar concepts without employing the specific term Evolutionary Astrology.

According to Forrest, Evolutionary Astrology is "the fusion of humanistic psychology on one hand with ancient metaphysics on the other hand. We assume, as we look at a chart in the evolutionary context, that the person has this birth chart for a reason ... and that built into your chart is a description of what we might think of as an evolutionary predicament or a karmic predicament — a set of illusions that you have, a set of issues you may have, things you need to work on, things that can trip you up ... and then most importantly, the birth chart will describe 'the medicine' ... a kind of experiential recipe that you can follow in order to optimally empower yourself, heal the wounded places in your psyche, and get on with your journey."

Forrest calls Evolutionary Astrology "utterly practical, utterly testable," and "the most verifiable form of astrology that I have ever encountered." In a 2009 interview with astrologer and All Music Guide founder Michael Erlewine, Forrest stated that "When astrologers hear that Evolutionary Astrology is about reincarnation, they often react as if it must all be woo-woo. Actually it is a very hard-hitting form of psychological astrology: intense, but compassionate. And imminently verifiable in the present-tense of people’s lives."

Actor Robert Downey Jr. has praised Forrest's work with Evolutionary Astrology, saying “I marvel at the accuracy of Steven’s readings. He insists that nothing is so grave as to be beyond repair, and correspondingly that there is no rainbow that won’t be evaporated by poor judgment in the now. I can’t recommend him highly enough.”

== Position on fate ==
Forrest takes a radical position on the nature of fate and free will within the field of astrology. Forrest states that "I unabashedly preach the primacy of free will in shaping our experience. In some more 'deterministic' astrological circles, this is blasphemy. I am personally confident that we humans are capable of changing ourselves, capable of evolution. None of us is limited to a 'nature' that is cast in stone by the positions of the planets. As we change ourselves, we make different choices and thus create different futures."

Commenting on his strong emphasis on choice and free will, O, The Oprah Magazine declared that "Forrest's approach . . . stops the blame game in its tracks. . . we're warriors fulfilling our turbulent evolutionary paths."

== Bibliography ==
=== Books ===
- The Inner Sky: How to Make Wiser Choices for a More Fulfilling Life. 2nd. ed. Borrego Springs: Seven Paws Press. 1984/2007 ISBN 978-0979067716
- The Changing Sky: Creating Your Future with Transits, Progressions and Evolutionary Astrology. 2nd. ed. Borrego Springs: Seven Paws Press. 1986/2008 ISBN 978-0979067723
- The Night Speaks: A Meditation on the Astrological World View. San Diego: ACS Publications. 1993 ISBN 978-0935127256
- The Book of Pluto: Finding Wisdom in Darkness with Astrology. 2nd ed. Borrego Springs: Seven Paws Press. 1995/2013 ISBN 978-0979067761
- Stalking Anubis. Borrego Springs: Seven Paws Press. 2002 ISBN 978-0964911369
- Yesterday's Sky: Astrology and Reincarnation. Borrego Springs: Seven Paws Press. 2008/2012 ISBN 978-0979067730
- The Book of the Moon: Discovering Astrology's Lost Dimension. Borrego Springs: Seven Paws Press. 2010 ISBN 978-0979067747
- The Book of Neptune. Borrego Springs: Seven Paws Press. 2016 ISBN 978-1939510914
- The Book of Fire: The Life-Givers. Borrego Springs: Seven Paws Press. 2018 ISBN 978-1939510020
- The Book of Earth: Making it Real. Borrego Springs: Seven Paws Press. 2019 ISBN 978-1939510044
- The Book of Air: The Art of Paying Attention. Borrego Springs: Seven Paws Press. 2020 ISBN 978-1939510068
- The Book of Water: Healing, Regeneration and Recovery. Borrego Springs: Seven Paws Press. 2020 ISBN 978-1939510099

=== Articles ===
- "The Bright (and Cloudy) Dawn of a New Age." The Sun. May 1980
- "Fate and Freedom: A Middle Path." The Mountain Astrologer. February 1997
- "Electional Astrology: The Fine Art of Seizing the Moment." The Mountain Astrologer. March 2001
- "Astrology and Reincarnation." The Mountain Astrologer. August 2005
- "The New Solar System." The Mountain Astrologer. August 2007
- "The Out of Bounds Moon." The Mountain Astrologer. June 2010

=== As co-author or contributor ===
- Forrest, Jodie; Forrest, Steven (2002) [1988]. Skymates: Love, Sex and Evolutionary Astrology (2nd ed.). Borrego Springs: Seven Paws Press. ISBN 978-0964911352.
- Forrest, Steven; Green, Jeffrey Wolf (2000). Measuring the Night: Evolutionary Astrology and the Keys to the Soul. Vol. 1. Borrego Springs: Seven Paws Press. ISBN 978-0964911338.
- Forrest, Steven; Green, Jeffrey Wolf (2000). Measuring the Night: Evolutionary Astrology and the Keys to the Soul. Vol. 2. Borrego Springs: Seven Paws Press. ISBN 978-0964911345.
- Shaneman, Jhampa; Angel, Jan V. (2003). Buddhist Astrology: Chart Interpretation from a Buddhist Perspective. Llewellyn Publications. ISBN 978-0738703152.
- Nasser, Rafael (2004). Under One Sky. Borrego Springs: Seven Paws Press. ISBN 978-0964911376.
- Forrest, Jodie; Forrest, Steven (2005). Skymates II: The Composite Chart. Vol. 2. Borrego Springs: Seven Paws Press. ISBN 978-0964911383.
