= Tyl =

Tyl or TYL may refer to:

- IATA code of the Cap. FAP Victor Montes Arias Airport in Talara, Piura, Peru
- Rear Services of the Armed Forces of the Russian Federation

== People with the surname ==
- Josef Kajetán Tyl (1808–1856), Czech playwright
- Noel Jan Tyl (1936–2019), American astrologer

== Astronomy ==
- Epsilon Draconis (Tyl), a star in the constellation of Draco.
