= Mundane astrology =

Branch of astrology dealing with politics, government, and law

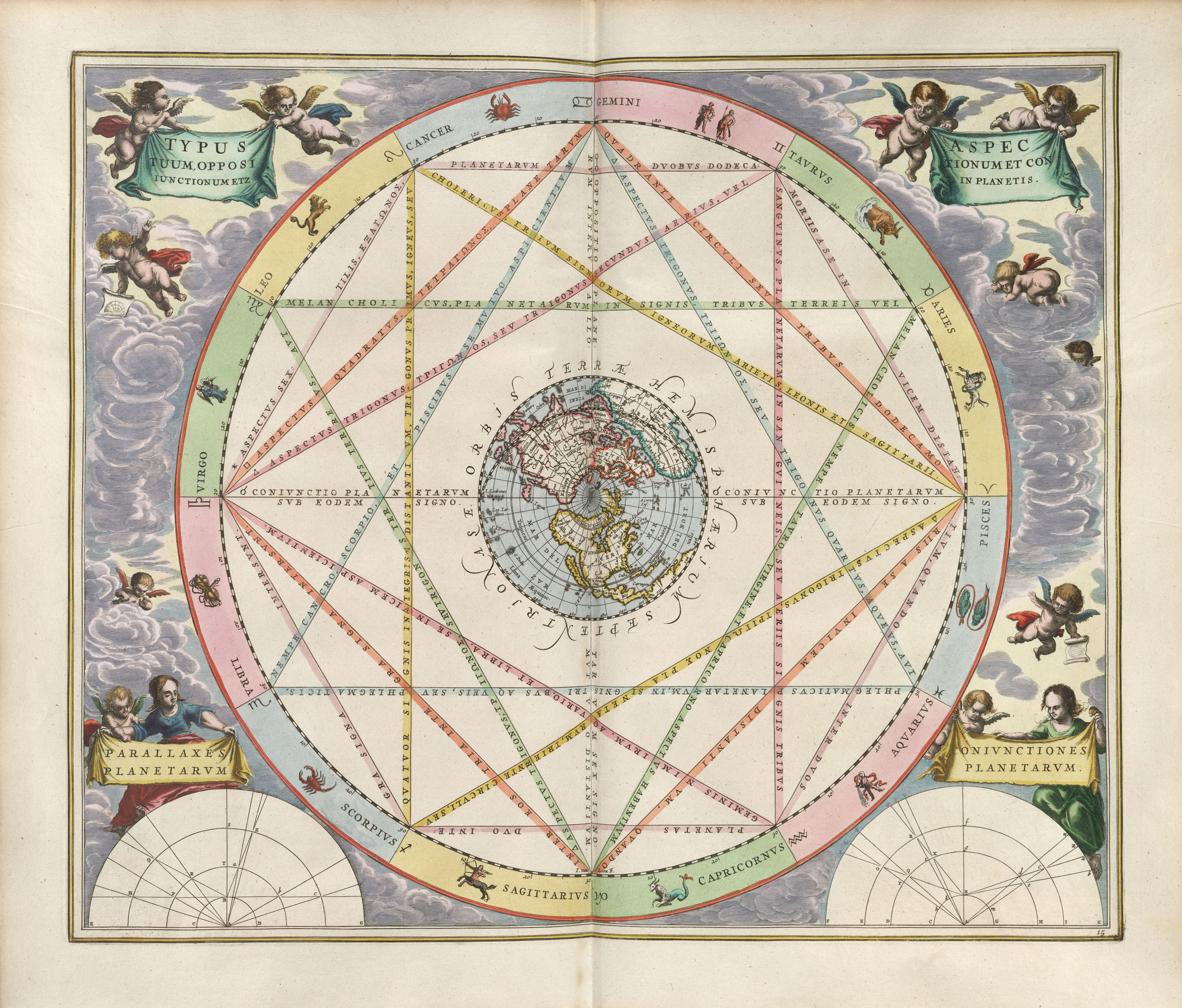
Image from Andreas Cellarius, Harmonia macrocosmica, plate 15, 1661

Mundane astrology, also known as political astrology, is the branch of astrology dealing with politics, the government, and the laws governing a particular nation, state, or city. The name derives name from the Latin term mundus, 'world'.

Certain countries have astrological charts (or horoscopes) just like a person is said to in astrology; for example, the chart for the United States is widely thought to be sometime during the day of July 4, 1776, for this is the exact day that the Declaration of Independence was signed and made fully official, thus causing the "birth" of the United States as a nation. Indeed, July 4 is a major national holiday in America and unequivocally thought of as the "birthday" of the entire nation.

== History ==
Mundane astrology is widely believed by astrological historians to be the most ancient branch of astrology. Early Babylonian astrology was exclusively concerned with mundane astrology, being geographically oriented, specifically applied to countries cities and nations, and almost wholly concerned with the welfare of the state and the king as the governing head of the nation. Astrological practices of divination and planetary interpretation have been used for millennia to answer political questions, but only with the gradual emergence of horoscopic astrology, from the sixth century BC, did astrology develop into the two distinct branches of mundane astrology and natal astrology.

== Sassanian Persian Influence ==
Mundane astrology experienced significant development in pre-Islamic Iran, particularly during the Sasanian Empire. While earlier astrological practices focused primarily on natal astrology, Persian astrologers expanded these techniques to a macro level to predict the fate of nations, rulers, and global events.

One of the most notable contributions of Sasanian astrologers to mundane astrology was the development of the Jupiter-Saturn conjunction cycle. This cyclical framework was introduced as a method to trace historical epochs and forecast the rise and fall of empires and religions. By applying traditional astrological principles to large-scale political and social shifts, they established the foundational methods of mundane astrology that were later transmitted to the Islamic world and medieval Europe.

Reflections of ancient Iranian traditions regarding mundane astrology can be found in the Shahnameh, the Persian national epic. In this work, court astrologers are frequently consulted to predict the future of kings and the outcome of major national events. This indicates that celestial bodies were viewed as signs for understanding the shifting of eras and large-scale earthly occurrences. Scholars use the concept of Akhtarmāri (star-counting or astrology) to describe these ancient beliefs, which entered the epic through older sources such as the Khwaday-Namag. In the sections of the Shahnameh dealing with the Sasanian Empire, these astrological references become much more technical, aligning perfectly with the prominent status and sophisticated nature of mundane astrology in late antique Iran.

== Techniques and principles ==
Astrologically, the affairs of a nation are judged from the horoscope set up at the time of its official inauguration or the birth chart of its leader, or various phenomena such as eclipses, lunations, great conjunctions, planetary stations, comets and ingresses.

The techniques of the subject were discussed in detail in the 2nd century work of the Alexandrian astronomer Ptolemy, who outlined its principles in the second book of his Tetrabiblos. Ptolemy set this topic before his discussion of individual birth charts because he argued that the astrological assessment of any 'particular' individual must rest upon prior knowledge of the 'general' temperament of their ethnic type; and that the circumstances of individual lives are subsumed, to some extent, within the fate of their community. (Note: Ptolemy (1940), II, 2: p. 119: "And since weaker natures always yield to the stronger, and the particular always falls under the general, it would by all means be necessary for those who purpose an inquiry about a single individual long before to have comprehended the more general considerations".) The third chapter of his work offers an association between planets, zodiac signs and the national characteristics of 73 nations. It concludes with three assertions which act as core principles of mundane astrology:

1. Each of the fixed stars has familiarity with the countries attributed to the sign of its ecliptic rising.
2. The time of the first founding of a city (or nation) can be used in a similar way to an individual horoscope, to astrologically establish the characteristics and experiences of that city. The most significant considerations are the regions of the zodiac which mark the place of the Sun and Moon, and the four angles of the chart – in particular the ascendant.
3. If the time of the foundation of the city or nation is not known, a similar use can be made of the horoscope of whoever holds office or is king at the time, with particular attention given to the midheaven of that chart.

== Practice ==
The first English astrologer for whom we have evidence of astrological practice is Richard Trewythian, whose notebook is largely concerned with mundane astrology. He constructed horoscopes for the Sun's ingress into Aries over thirty years, and recorded general predictions for twelve of those years between 1430 and 1458. His notebooks demonstrate how he recorded the logic for his conclusions:

Pregnant women and boys will incur harm and severe dangers. This conclusion is drawn from the trine aspect between Saturn and Venus on the day of the ingress.

Concerning the wars of this year: they will be caused by the aspect of opposition of two heavy planets, which will occur on 27 March. And the time of the beginning of the war will be on the first day of May. This conclusion is drawn by the application of the greater luminary to Saturn. Merchants will be well disposed this year.

He also made several predictions concerning the king (Henry VI), such as one he made in 1433 where he noted: "it seems that the king will be sick this year because Saturn is lord of the tenth house".
