= Liz Greene =

American astrologer and author (born 1946)

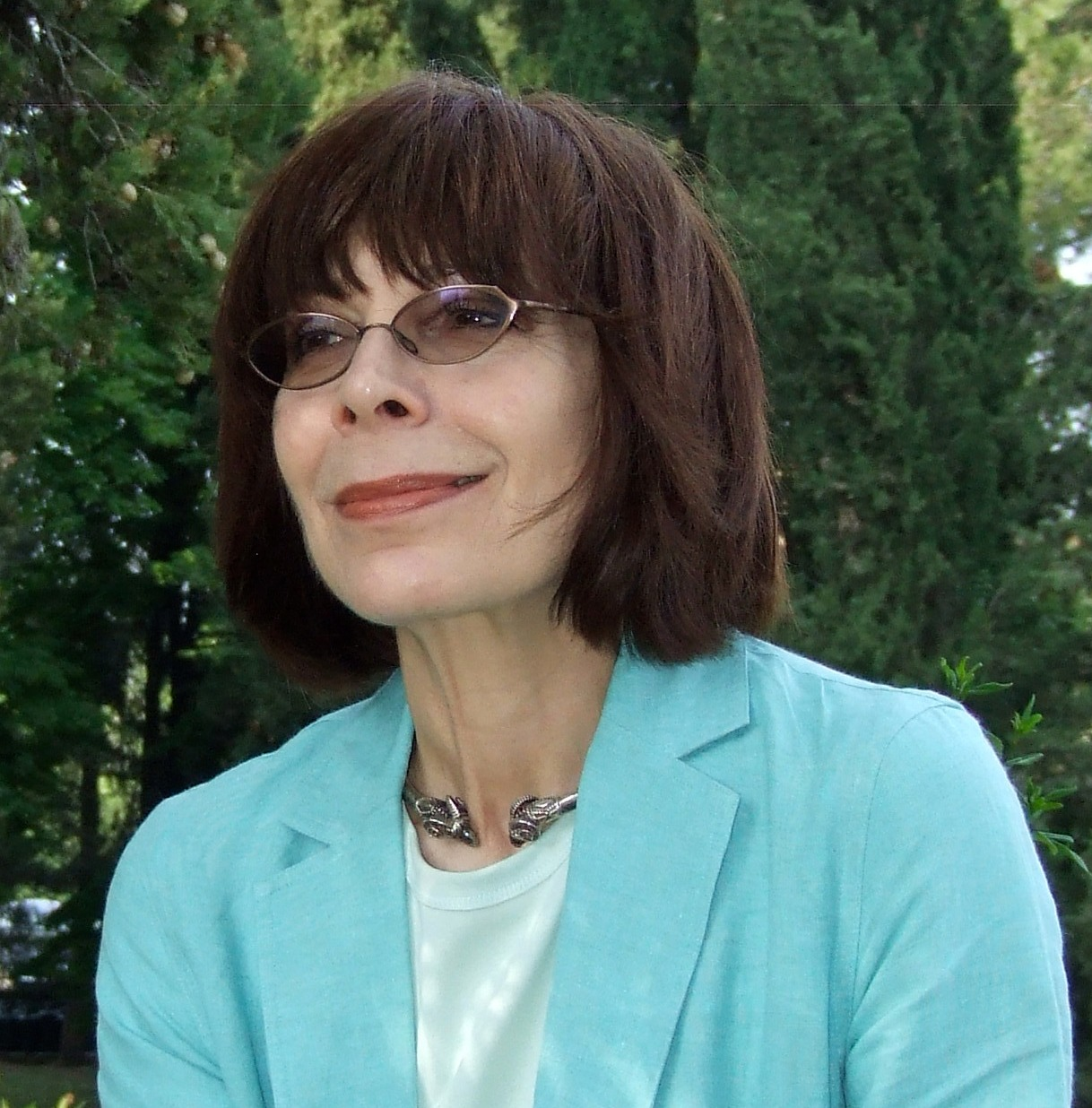
- Greene during conference break, May 2006 in Italy
- Born: 4 September 1946 (age 79); Englewood, New Jersey, United States
- Occupations: astrologer, Jungian analyst and author
- Years active: 1976–present
- Relatives: Richard Leigh (brother, 1943–2007), author

Liz Greene (born 4 September 1946) is an American-British astrologer and author. Her father was born in London, and her mother in the United States.

== Career ==
Greene is one of the chief writers for astro.com, the website for her company Astrodienst.

Greene has written several astrology books based on Jungian psychology and other forms of depth psychology, contributing to an application of astrology called "Psychological astrology".

In 1985 Greene started co-operating with Alois Treindl, founder of Swiss-based Astrodienst, on the development of computer-generated horoscopes, which would present a person with a chart synthesis, simulating Greene's own method of horoscope interpretation during a personal reading. In 1987, they presented the Psychological Horoscope Analysis, which was followed by several other interpretations.

With Howard Sasportas, Greene co-founded the Centre for Psychological Astrology in London. After Sasportas' death in 1992, astrologer Charles Harvey took over as co-director, until his death in 2000. Greene continues directing the organisation. In addition, she also directs CPA Press, a publishing company that focuses on specialist astrological works.

Greene's book Saturn: A New Look at an Old Devil (1976), applied Jungian psychology to revise the image of Saturn as a planet of misfortune, recasting it in a more Jungian image.

Greene wrote a historical novel in 1980, The Dreamer of the Vine, dealing with the themes of Nostradamus and the Jesus bloodline. Her remaining books have been on topics applying principles of psychoanalysis to astrology (Psychological astrology). Many are transcripts of her lectures, and many are co-authored, especially with Howard Sasportas.

In addition to giving lectures and directing a certificate programme in psychological astrology, Greene has continued to produce many books, all of which are now published by her own company, the CPA Press. She has also co-authored, with Juliet Sharman-Burke, a deck of tarot cards, The Mythic Tarot.

Her books include Saturn: A New Look at an Old Devil, the philosophically-inclined The Astrology of Fate, The Outer Planets & Their Cycles, The Luminaries (with H. Sasportas) and The Dark of the Soul.

In April 2010, the History Department of the University of Bristol, England, granted her a doctorate degree for her thesis "The Kabbalah in British Occultism 1860-1940".

== Major publications ==
- Liz Greene Astrology for Lovers Weiser Books ISBN 1578634261
- Liz Greene (1976) Saturn: A New Look at an Old Devil. Samuel Weiser, Inc. York Beach, ME. ISBN 0-87728-306-0
- Liz Greene (1977) Relating: An Astrological Guide to Living with Others on a Small Planet. Samuel Weiser, Inc. York Beach, ME. ISBN 0-87728-418-0
- Liz Greene (1981) The Dreamer of the Vine - A Novel About Nostradamus. W.W.Norton & Co Inc. ISBN 0-393-01434-7
- Liz Greene (1983) The Outer Planets & Their Cycles: The Astrology of the Collective. CRCS Publications, Sebastopol, CA. ISBN 0-916360-60-1
- Liz Greene (1984) The Astrology of Fate. Samuel Weiser, Inc. York Beach, ME. ISBN 0-87728-636-1
- Liz Greene (1987) The Puppet Master - A Novel. Arkadia. ISBN 1850630577
- Liz Greene and Stephen Arroyo (1984) The Jupiter/Saturn Conference Lectures. CRCS Publications, Sebastopol, CA. ISBN 0-916360-16-4. (re-published as New Insights in Modern Astrology, (1991) CRCS ISBN 0-916360-47-4)
- Liz Greene and Howard Sasportas (1987) The Development of the Personality. Samuel Weiser, Inc. York Beach, ME. ISBN 0-87728-673-6
- Liz Greene and Howard Sasportas (1988) Dynamics of the Unconscious. Samuel Weiser, Inc. York Beach, ME. ISBN 0-87728-674-4.
- Liz Greene and Howard Sasportas (1992) The Luminaries. Samuel Weiser, Inc. York Beach, ME. ISBN 0-87728-750-3
- Liz Greene and Howard Sasportas (posthum.) (1993) The Inner Planets. Samuel Weiser, Inc. York Beach, ME. ISBN 0-87728-741-4
- Liz Greene (1996) The Astrological Neptune and the Quest for Redemption. Samuel Weiser, Inc. York Beach, ME. ISBN 1578631971
- Liz Greene and Juliet Sharman-Burke (2001) The Mythic Tarot. Fireside Books, New York, NY. ISBN 0-7432-1919-8.
- Liz Greene (2003) The Dark of the Soul: Psychopathology in the Horoscope. Centre for Psychological Astrology Press, London. ISBN 1-900869-28-4
- Liz Greene (2023) Chiron in Love: The Astrology of Envy, Rage, Compassion and Wisdom. The Wessex Astrologer, Dorset. ISBN 978-1-910531-96-9
- Liz Greene (2024) By Jove: The Meaning of the Astrological Jupiter. The Wessex Astrologer, Dorset. ISBN 978-1-910531-24-2
