= Psychological astrology =

Astrology based on psychology

Psychological astrology, or astropsychology, is the result of the cross-fertilisation of the fields of astrology with depth psychology, humanistic psychology and transpersonal psychology. There are several methods of analyzing the horoscope in the contemporary psychological astrology: the horoscope can be analysed through the archetypes within astrology (as is characteristic for Jungian approach in astrology) or the analyses can be rooted in the psychological need and motivational theories. No methodologically sound scientific studies exist that show a benefit or detriment in using psychological astrology. Psychological astrology, or astropsychology is a pseudoscience.

== Origins ==
In the twentieth century, the western esoteric tradition inspired the Swiss psychiatrist and founder of analytical psychology, Carl Jung to formulate his archetypal hypothesis, influenced by Plato's theory of ideas or forms. In his research into the symbolic meaning of his patient's dreams, conversations and paintings, Jung observed recurring mythical themes or archetypes. He proposed that these universal and timeless archetypes channel experiences and emotions, resulting in recognizable and typical patterns of behavior with certain probable outcomes. Jung observed a correlation between these archetypal images and the astrological themes or traditional 'gods' associated with the planets and signs of the zodiac. He concluded that the symbolic heavenly figures described by the constellations were originally inspired by projections of images created by the collective unconscious. Jung wrote "Astrology represents the sum of all the psychological knowledge of antiquity".

In collaboration with pioneer theoretical physicist (and Nobel laureate) Wolfgang Pauli, Jung developed the theory of synchronicity. This theory, which Jung compared to Aristotle's formal causation, poses that "whatever is born or done at this particular moment of time, has the quality of this moment of time". Correlations between the position of heavenly bodies at the time of birth and an individual's development were defined by Jung as being acausal and not directly caused by the planets.

== Jungian legacy ==
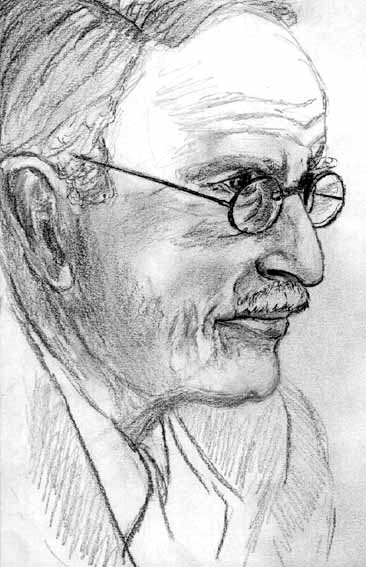
Carl Gustav Jung portrait

Several astrologers as well as psychologists pursued Jung's theories in their writings, teachings and practice. One of the first astrologers to combine Jungian psychology with astrology was Dane Rudhyar and his protégé, Alexander Ruperti. Rudhyar termed it "humanistic astrology," the subject of his monumental volume, The Astrology of Personality, published in 1936. Psychological astrology, however became firmly established in the late 20th century with the books and lectures of Liz Greene and Stephen Arroyo who were both strongly influenced by the Jungian model. In 1983, Liz Greene and Howard Sasportas, a psychosynthesis psychotherapist, founded the Centre for Psychological Astrology in London.

Meanwhile, in Switzerland, Bruno and Louise Huber also developed their own method of astrological psychology, referred to as the Huber Method which was influenced by Roberto Assagioli's work with psychosynthesis. In 1962, the Hubers founded the Huber School of Astrology and their work is now taught at the Astrological Psychology Association.

== Other psychological approaches ==
Back in the 1970s, in the twelve-volume series, The Principles and Practice of Astrology (Llewellyn 1975), Noel Tyl has allied Maslow's hierarchy of needs theory with astrological symbolism. This analytical blend is developed fully in his book Holistic Astrology: The Analysis of Inner and Outer Environment (1980). In the light of the psychological need theory, he interprets the horoscope "as a process of lifelong conditioning, where individuals are predisposed to present individualized needs to the environment. [...] This process identifies how we act, who we are, and how we fit into the world. Fulfilling destiny, in modern terms, is fulfilling needs." Later authors have acknowledged the inability of horoscopes to determine personality but have argued that astrological symbolism is an ancient heuristic which has projectively represented basic human drives, needs and personality factors.

== Criticism ==
Psychological astrology has been criticized for confirmation bias and astrology is widely considered a pseudoscience by the scientific community. In psychology and cognitive science, confirmation bias is a tendency to search for or interpret new information in a way that confirms one's preconceptions and avoids information and interpretations that contradict prior beliefs.

== Research ==
A definitive scientific test study of the claims of astrology was published by Shawn Carlson in Nature. Twenty-eight professional astrologers agreed to participate, including several who were strongly influenced by the Jungian model. Carlson concluded that the astrologers were unable to match horoscopes with profiles compiled using the California Psychological Inventory (CPI) in blind tests any better than chance.

== See also ==
- Astrological symbols – Symbols denoting astrological concepts
- Astrology and alchemy – Planets visible to the naked eye
- Astrology and astronomy
- Astrology and computers – Computer software used for astrology
- Influence of seasonal birth in humans
- Self-actualization – Human emotional need
- Western esotericism and psychology
