= Astrology and astronomy =

Astrology and astronomy were archaically treated together (Latin: astrologia), but gradually distinguished through the Late Middle Ages into the Age of Reason. Developments in 17th century philosophy resulted in astrology and astronomy operating as independent pursuits by the 18th century.

Whereas the academic discipline of astronomy studies observable phenomena beyond the Earth's atmosphere, astrology uses the apparent positions of celestial objects as the basis for divination.

== Overview ==
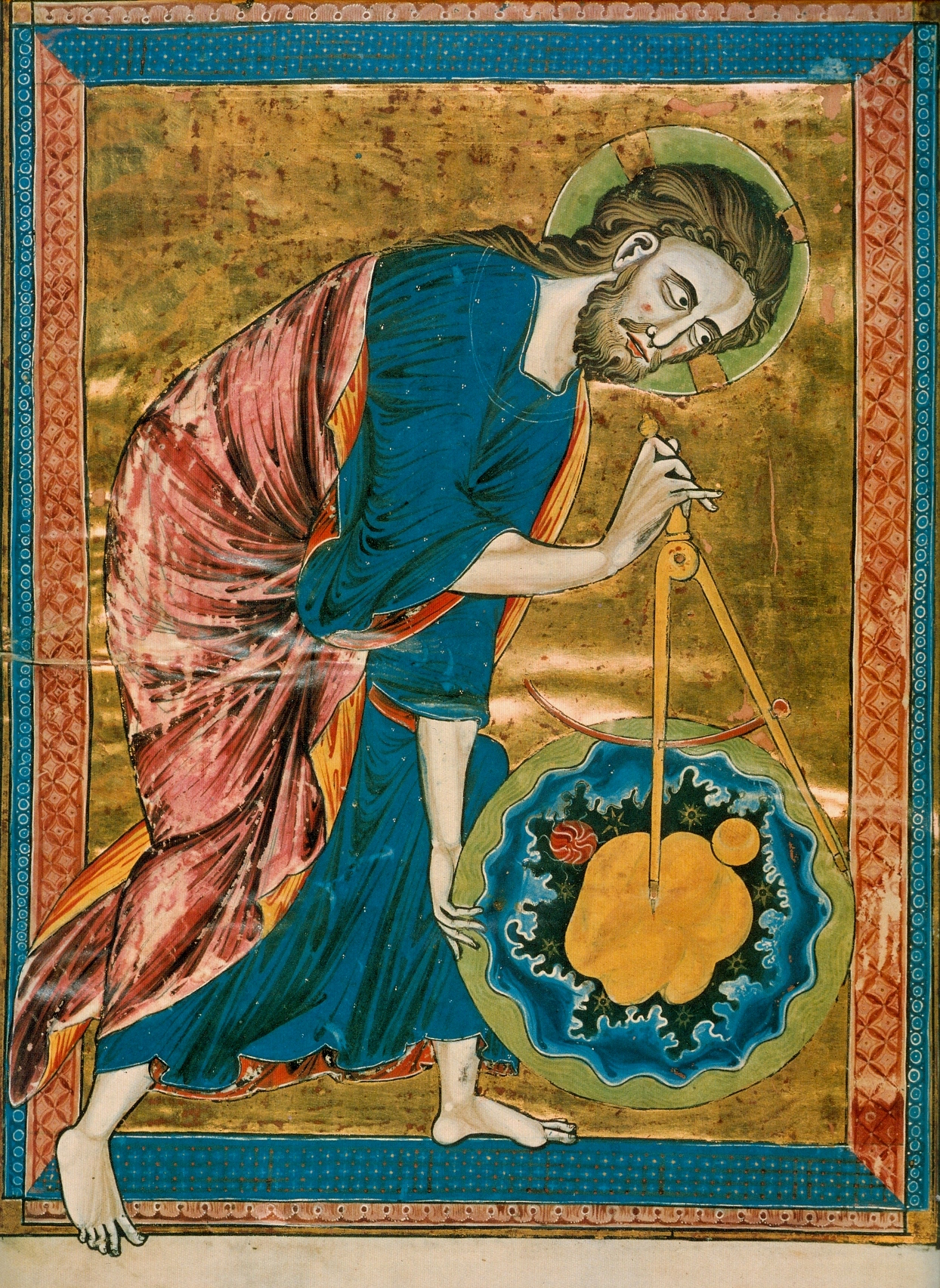
Early science, particularly geometry and astronomy/astrology (astronomia), was connected to the divine for most medieval scholars. The compass in this 13th-century manuscript is a symbol of God's act of creation, as many believed that there was something intrinsically divine or perfect that could be found in circles.

In pre-modern times, most cultures did not make a clear distinction between the two disciplines, putting them both together as one. In ancient Babylonia, famed for its astrology, there were not separate roles for the astronomer as predictor of celestial phenomena, and the astrologer as their interpreter; both functions were performed by the same person. In ancient Greece, pre-Socratic thinkers such as Anaximander, Xenophanes, Anaximenes, and Heraclides speculated about the nature and substance of the stars and planets. Astronomers such as Eudoxus (contemporary with Plato) observed planetary motions and cycles, and created a geocentric cosmological model that would be accepted by Aristotle. This model generally lasted until Ptolemy, who added epicycles to explain the retrograde motion of Mars. (Around 250 BC, Aristarchus of Samos postulated a proto-heliocentric theory, which would not be reconsidered for nearly two millennia (Copernicus), as Aristotle's geocentric model continued to be favored.) The Platonic school promoted the study of astronomy as a part of philosophy because the motions of the heavens demonstrate an orderly and harmonious cosmos. In the third century BC, Babylonian astrology began to make its presence felt in Greece. Astrology was criticized by Hellenistic philosophers such as the Academic Skeptic Carneades and Middle Stoic Panaetius. However, the notions of the Great Year (when all the planets complete a full cycle and return to their relative positions) and eternal recurrence were Stoic doctrines that made divination and fatalism possible.

In the Hellenistic world, the Greek words 'astrologia' and 'astronomia' were often used interchangeably, but they were conceptually not the same. Plato taught about 'astronomia' and stipulated that planetary phenomena should be described by a geometrical model. The first solution was proposed by Eudoxus. Aristotle favored a physical approach and adopted the word 'astrologia'. Eccentrics and epicycles came to be thought of as useful fictions. For a more general public, the distinguishing principle was not evident and either word was acceptable. For the Babylonian horoscopic practice, the words specifically used were 'apotelesma' and 'katarche', but otherwise it was subsumed under the aristotelian term 'astrologia'.

In his compilatory work Etymologiae, Isidore of Seville noted explicitly the difference between the terms astronomy and astrology (Etymologiae, III, xxvii) and the same distinction appeared later in the texts of Arabian writers. Isidore identified the two strands entangled in the astrological discipline and called them astrologia naturalis and astrologia superstitiosa.

Astrology was widely accepted in medieval Europe as astrological texts from Hellenistic and Arabic astrologers were translated into Latin. In the late Middle Ages, its acceptance or rejection often depended on its reception in the royal courts of Europe. Not until the time of Francis Bacon was astrology rejected as a part of scholastic metaphysics rather than empirical observation. A more definitive split between astrology and astronomy in the West took place gradually in the seventeenth and eighteenth centuries, when astrology was increasingly thought of as an occult science or superstition by the intellectual elite. The famous polymath Al-Biruni was one of the first scholars to make this distinction in the late 10th and early 11th centuries CE. He differentiated astrology from astronomy considering the former more of an art or practice and criticised its weak mathematical and scientific foundations. Because of their lengthy shared history, it sometimes happens that the two are confused with one another even today. Many contemporary astrologers, however, do not claim that astrology is a science, but think of it as a form of divination like the I-Ching, an art, or a part of a spiritual belief structure (influenced by trends such as Neoplatonism, Neopaganism, Theosophy, and Hinduism).

== Distinguishing characteristics ==
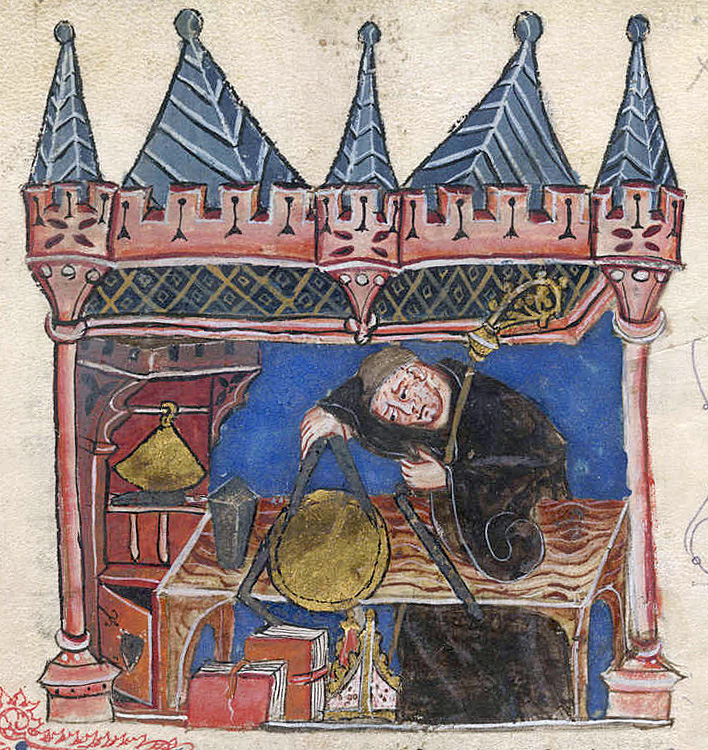
Astrologer–astronomer Richard of Wallingford is shown measuring an equatorium with a pair of compasses in this 14th-century work.

The primary goal of astronomy is to understand the physics of the universe. Astrologers use astronomical calculations for the positions of celestial bodies along the ecliptic and attempt to correlate celestial events (astrological aspects, sign positions) with earthly events and human affairs. Astronomers consistently use the scientific method, naturalistic presuppositions and abstract mathematical reasoning to investigate or explain phenomena in the universe. Astrologers use mystical or religious reasoning as well as traditional folklore, symbolism and superstition blended with mathematical predictions to explain phenomena in the universe. The scientific method is not consistently used by astrologers.

Astrologers practice their discipline geocentrically and they consider the universe to be harmonious, changeless and static, while astronomers have employed the scientific method to infer that the universe is without a center and is dynamic, expanding outward per the Big Bang theory.

Astrologers believe that the position of the stars and planets determine an individual's personality and future. Astronomers study the actual stars and planets, but have found no evidence supporting astrological theories. Psychologists study personality, and while there are many theories of personality, no mainstream theories in that field are based on astrology. (The Myers-Briggs personality typology, based on the works of Carl Jung, has four major categories that correspond to the astrological elements of fire, air, earth, and water. This theory of personality is used by career counselors and life coaches but not by psychologists.)

Both astrologers and astronomers see Earth as being an integral part of the universe, that Earth and the universe are interconnected as one cosmos (not as being separate and distinct from each other). However, astrologers philosophically and mystically portray the cosmos as having a supernatural, metaphysical and divine essence that actively influences world events and the personal lives of people. Astronomers, as members of the scientific community, cannot use in their scientific articles explanations that are not derived from empirically reproducible conditions, irrespective of their personal convictions.

== Historical divergence ==
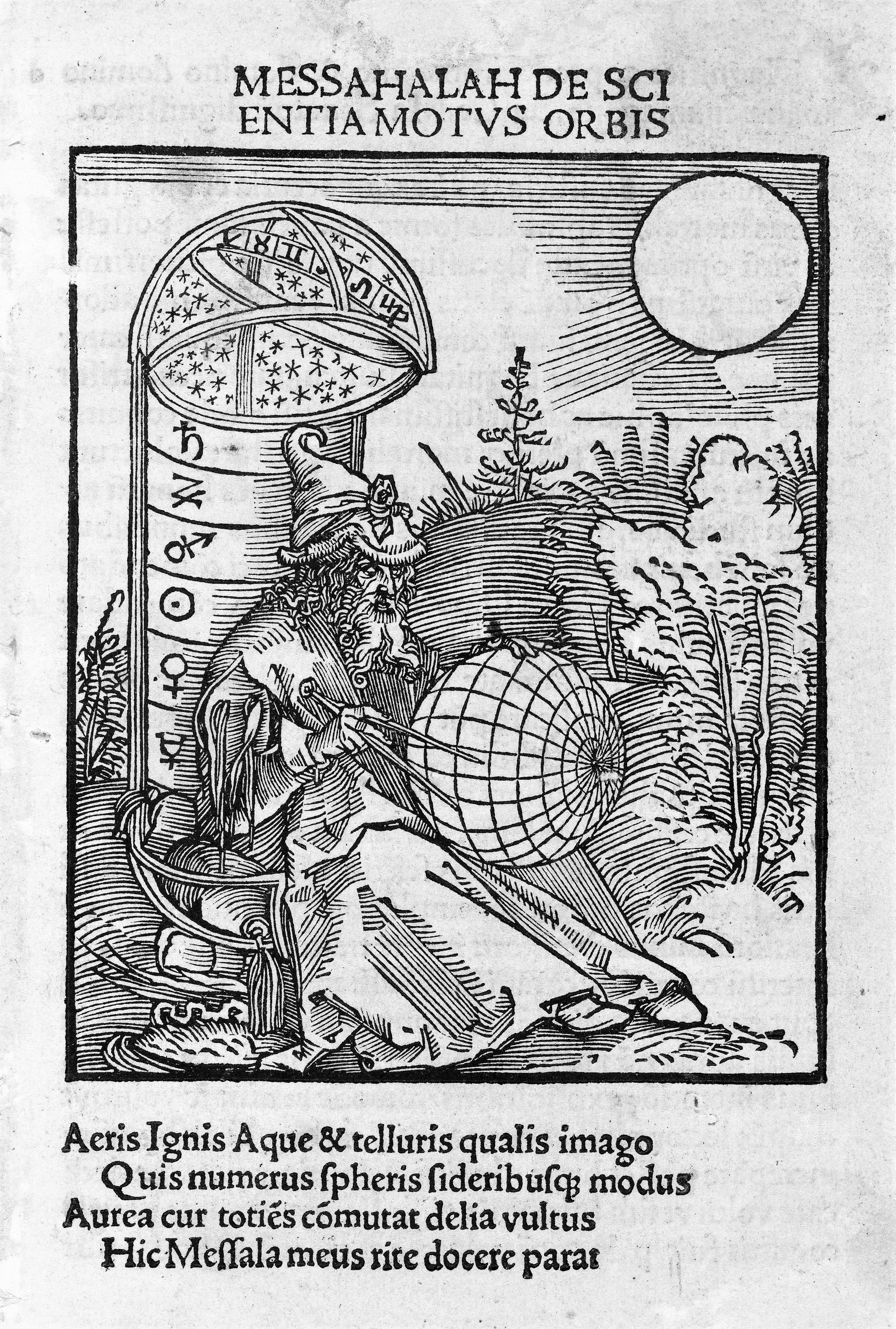
An engraving by Albrecht Dürer featuring Mashallah, from the title page of the De scientia motus orbis (Latin version with engraving, 1504). As in many medieval illustrations, the compass here is an icon of religion as well as science, in reference to God as the architect of creation.

For a long time the funding from astrology supported some astronomical research, which was in turn used to make more accurate ephemerides for use in astrology. In Medieval Europe the word Astronomia was often used to encompass both disciplines as this included the study of astronomy and astrology jointly and without a real distinction; this was one of the original Seven Liberal Arts. Kings and other rulers generally employed court astrologers to aid them in the decision making in their kingdoms, thereby funding astronomical research. During the Renaissance period Astrology and Astronomy shared a theoretical and practical dimension shaping of the Renaissance society. Renaissance Europe had astronomy closely interwoven with Astrology, which was widely considered as a legitimate science, though less certain than Astronomy. Astrology in this time period involved from not only doing horoscopes of individual peoples, but for weddings and the most propitious time to consummate them; weather predictions; the timing of specific events such as coronation; starting a war or journeys, and even medical and surgical procedures. University medical students were taught astrology as it was generally used in medical practice.

Astronomy and astrology diverged over the course of the 17th through 19th centuries. It is unclear if Copernicus practiced astrology, but the most important astronomers before Isaac Newton were astrologers by profession—Tycho Brahe, Johannes Kepler, and Galileo Galilei.

Also relevant here was the development of better timekeeping instruments, initially for aid in navigation; improved timekeeping made it possible to make more exact astrological predictions—predictions which could be tested, and which consistently proved to be false. By the end of the 18th century, astronomy was one of the major sciences of the Enlightenment model, using the recently codified scientific method, and was altogether distinct from astrology.

== Astrology and zodiac signs in the modern age ==
Astrology is considered by many philosophers and astronomers to be a false representation of the universe that individuals may use to associate the movement of the celestial bodies to their own ideas of human life and spirituality. Although many scholars consider astrology to be a pseudoscience, those that believe in zodiac signs and their meanings will argue the opposite, and these followers will support their claims with explanations for how and why the universe is connected to the human condition.

The most popular and well-known form of astrology is seen in horoscopes that people are exposed to through social media, popular news outlets, and digital media. The horoscopes allow people interested in astrology and zodiac signs to associate planets like Mars to human emotions such as drive and courage, and further increase the notion that these planets and their motions have an effect on their daily lives. Although astrology was considered factual predictions in ancient science, in modern times it is used as a spiritual belief system for many people. Ancient forms of astrology often combined with astronomy, but eventually split into separate paths during the time of Copernicus, Kepler, and Galileo.

Zodiac signs in modern times are constructed from constellations seen across the earth, and they are used to associate human emotions and tendencies with the stars and heavenly bodies. In some ways, astrology has become somewhat of a pseudo-religion, due to the emphasis put on the meanings of constellations and how they relate to each individual. One may "judge" another person based on their zodiac sign, simply because there are unique listed traits carried by each sign, which reflect on the person who it refers to.

The signs that are attributed to individuals are based on the time of year that each individual was born in. For example, people born between about 20 April and 20 May will carry the zodiac sign of Taurus, and those born between about 23 July and 22 August carry the Leo sign. Despite the many individuals that consider zodiac astrology to be factual, many consider the horoscope meanings to be false and simply participate in this modern astrology for enjoyment. Lastly, zodiac signs and astrology in the modern era are very different from the astrology of the ancient world. The minimal technology, knowledge, and expertise of the ancient world allowed for the combination of astrology and astronomy to become the generally accepted explanation for the universe and its impact on human lives. Whereas in current times, astrology and astronomy are extremely different.

Zodiac signs and horoscopes are a product of cultural developments (such as the internet) that allow for easy access to information on the horoscopes through social media, tabloids and news outlets that benefit from promoting these aspects of astrology. Many individuals that are interested in horoscopes are not aware that the signs and their respective dates are inaccurate, and do not have any basis in science. Due to the "trendy" nature of zodiac signs and their popularity, it is widely recognized as part of global culture.

Constellation / Sign	Symbol	Unicode Character	Historic Start Date	Historic End Date	Constellation Visibility Date Start (2002)	Constellation Visibility Date End (2002)
Aries		♈︎	21 March	20 April	19 April	14 May
Taurus		♉︎	21 April	21 May	15 May	20 June
Gemini		♊︎	22 May	21 June	21 June	20 July
Cancer		♋︎	22 June	23 July	21 July	10 August
Leo		♌︎	24 July	23 August	11 August	16 September
Virgo		♍︎	24 August	23 September	17 September	31 October
Libra		♎︎	24 September	23 October	1 November	24 November
Scorpio		♏︎	24 October	22 November	25 November	29 November
Ophiuchus*		⛎︎	N/A	N/A	30 November	17 December
Sagittarius		♐︎	23 November	21 December	18 December	19 January
Capricorn		♑︎	22 December	20 January	20 January	16 February
Aquarius		♒︎	21 January	19 February	17 February	11 March
Pisces		♓︎	20 February	20 March	12 March	18 April

* Scorpio is not visible through the full period. Instead, the constellation Ophiuchus is visible during this time and so is a proposed 13th zodiac sign.

== See also ==
- History of astrology
- History of astronomy
- Natal chart
- Panchangam
- The Sophia Centre
- Treatise on the Astrolabe
