= Stephen Arroyo =

American astrologer, astrological writer

Stephen Arroyo (born October 6, 1946) is an American best-selling author and astrologer.

== Early life ==
Arroyo was born in Kansas City, Missouri on October 6 (a Sunday) at 5.35 pm in 1946. Previous occupations include teacher, editor, counselor and Polarity Therapy practitioner.

== Career ==
Arroyo has written eight books on psychological astrology. His works recast astrological concepts in psychological and energy terms, and reject what he perceives as the fatalism and negativity of old-fashioned astrology. His books have now been translated into over 25 languages.

Regarding his written works, the Library Journal stated:

The simplicity and clarity of his treatment of complex ideas is remarkable; it makes accessible even to the beginner a wealth of understanding... giving meaningful psychological grounding to astrological interpretation."(July 1976 issue)

Arroyo has been guest speaker at events in North America, Mexico, and five European countries, and has taught astrology courses at four colleges in the United States.

He is gauged to be in the top 5% in his field.

== Awards ==
He has been awarded the British Astrological Association Astrology Prize, the Fraternity of Canadian Astrologers’ International Sun Award, and the United Astrology Congress's Regulus Award. He has an honors degree in Literature from the University of California and a master's degree in Psychology.

== Works ==
- Exploring Jupiter: The Astrological Key to Progress, Prosperity and Potential, ISBN 0-916360-58-X
- Stephen Arroyo's Chart Interpretation Handbook: Guidelines for Understanding the Birth Chart, ISBN 0-916360-49-0
- Relationships and Life Cycles: Modern Dimensions of Astrology, ISBN 0-916360-55-5
- Astrology, Karma & Transformation: The Inner Dimensions of the Birth Chart, ISBN 0-916360-54-7
- Astrology, Psychology and the Four Elements: An Energy Approach to Astrology and Its Use in the Counseling Arts, ISBN 0-916360-01-6 (Awarded the British Astrological Association's Astrology Prize.)
- Practicing the Cosmic Science: Key Insights in Modern Astrology, ISBN 0-916360-62-8
- Person-to-person Astrology: Energy Factors in Love, Sex and Compatibility., ISBN 978-1-58394-204-8
- The Practice And Profession Of Astrology: Rebuilding Our Lost Connections with the Cosmos, ISBN 0-916360-15-6
- Experiments & Experience with Astrology: Reflections on Methods & Meaning, ASIN B00GI0R1VW
- Modern Astrology: New insights (Stephen Arroyo y Liz Greene) ISBN 9789501705225
