= Horoscopic astrology =

Astrology defined by the ascendant

Horoscopic astrology is a form of astrology that uses a horoscope, a visual representation of the heavens, for a specific moment in time to interpret the purported meaning behind the alignment of the planets at that moment. The idea is that the placement of the planets at any given moment in time supposedly reflects the nature of that moment and especially anything that is born then, and proponents claim that this can be analyzed using the chart and a variety of rules for interpreting the "language" or symbols therein.

One of the defining characteristics of this form of astrology that makes it distinct from other traditions is the computation of the degree of the Eastern horizon rising against the backdrop of the ecliptic at the specific moment under examination, known as the ascendant. As a general rule, any system of astrology that does not use the ascendant does not fall under the category of horoscopic astrology, although there are some exceptions.

Modern scientific perspectives on the nature of celestial objects have disproven the theoretical basis for horoscopic astrology, and astrology have been recognized as a form of pseudoscience since the 18th century.

== Overview ==
Based on literary sources, it is held that Horoscopic astrology first appeared in the Mediterranean region, likely Hellenistic Egypt, sometime around the late 2nd or early 1st century BCE. In ancient Hellenistic astrology the ascendant demarcated the first celestial house of a chart, and the word for the ascendant in Greek was horoskopos. It's the word that the English term "horoscope" derives from, which in modern times has come to denote the diagram of the heavens as a whole. Horoscopic astrology has also been practiced in India and its current form is referred to as Jyotisha.

Horoscopic astrology can, in essence, be summed up as the practice of casting astrological charts that reflect the apparent positions of a variety of celestial bodies and points from the perspective of the subject at any given moment in time. The most prevalent application of horoscopic astrology is to use it to analyze the birth charts of individuals in order to read character, psychological traits, and, to some extent, destiny. In theory, however, a horoscope can be cast for the beginning of any entity, including organisations, nations, animals, and even objects (for example ships, cars and airplanes).

== Branches ==
There are four main branches of horoscopic astrology.

=== Natal astrology ===
Natal astrology, also known as Genethliacal astrology, is the system of astrology based upon the concept that each individual's personality or path in life can be determined by constructing a natal chart for the exact date, time, and location of a person's birth. Natal astrology can be found in both Eastern and Western traditions.

=== Mundane astrology ===
Mundane astrology (also known as political astrology) is the application of astrology to world affairs and world events, taking its name from the Roman word Mundus, meaning "the World". Mundane astrology is a branch of Judicial astrology and is widely believed by astrological historians to be the most ancient branch of astrology. Many modern and ancient mundane astrologers also believe correlations exist between geological phenomena (such as earthquakes, volcanic eruptions, etc.) and astronomical phenomena (the movement of celestial bodies in relation to the Earth).

=== Electional astrology ===
Electional astrology concerns itself with determining the most auspicious moment to begin an enterprise or undertaking, such as starting a business or founding an organization. It takes into account the individual person or persons involved, and the place where the action is to be performed, to suggest the best time to perform the activity.

=== Horary astrology ===
Horary astrology is a method by which an astrologer attempts to answer a specific question by constructing a horoscope for the exact time and place at which the question was asked. The answer might be a simple yes or no, but is, in general, more complex with insights into, for example, the motives of the questioner, the motives of others involved in the matter, and the options available to them.

== See also ==
- Hellenistic astrology
- History of astrology
- Jewish astrology
- Pseudoscience

== Sources ==
- AstrologyNotes' article on Horoscopic astrology - retrieved 1/16/2006 under the GNU Free Documentation License
