= Judicial astrology =

Form of astrology for forecasting events

Judicial astrology is the art of forecasting events by calculation of the planetary and stellar bodies and their relationship to the Earth. The term "judicial astrology" was mainly used in the Middle Ages and early Renaissance to mean the types of astrology that were considered to be heretical by the Catholic church, distinguished from the "natural astrology" such as medical astrology and meteorological astrology, which were seen as acceptable because they were a part of the natural sciences of the time.

== Categorisation ==
In the Middle Ages, natural astrology was mainly focused on the diagnosis and the treatment of medical patients. An additional use would have been the application of astrology to determine future weather patterns based on the Aristotelian/Ptolemaic rationale that the planets cause change in the sublunary world by producing an efflux of elements and qualities. Every other branch was lumped together into the heading of 'judicial astrology'. These included natal astrology, mundane astrology, horary astrology, and electional astrology. Judicial astrology is an obsolete category, because since the Middle Ages other sciences have arisen, astrology has ceased to be a tool in medicine and meteorology, and scientifically demonstrable parts of natural astrology such as the moon's effect on tides are considered to be physics not astrology.

== Sources ==
- Wood, Chauncey (1970). Chaucer and the Country of the Stars: Poetic Uses of Astrological Imagery. Princeton University Press.
