= Astrology in the medieval Islamic world =

Islamic astrology of the Golden Age

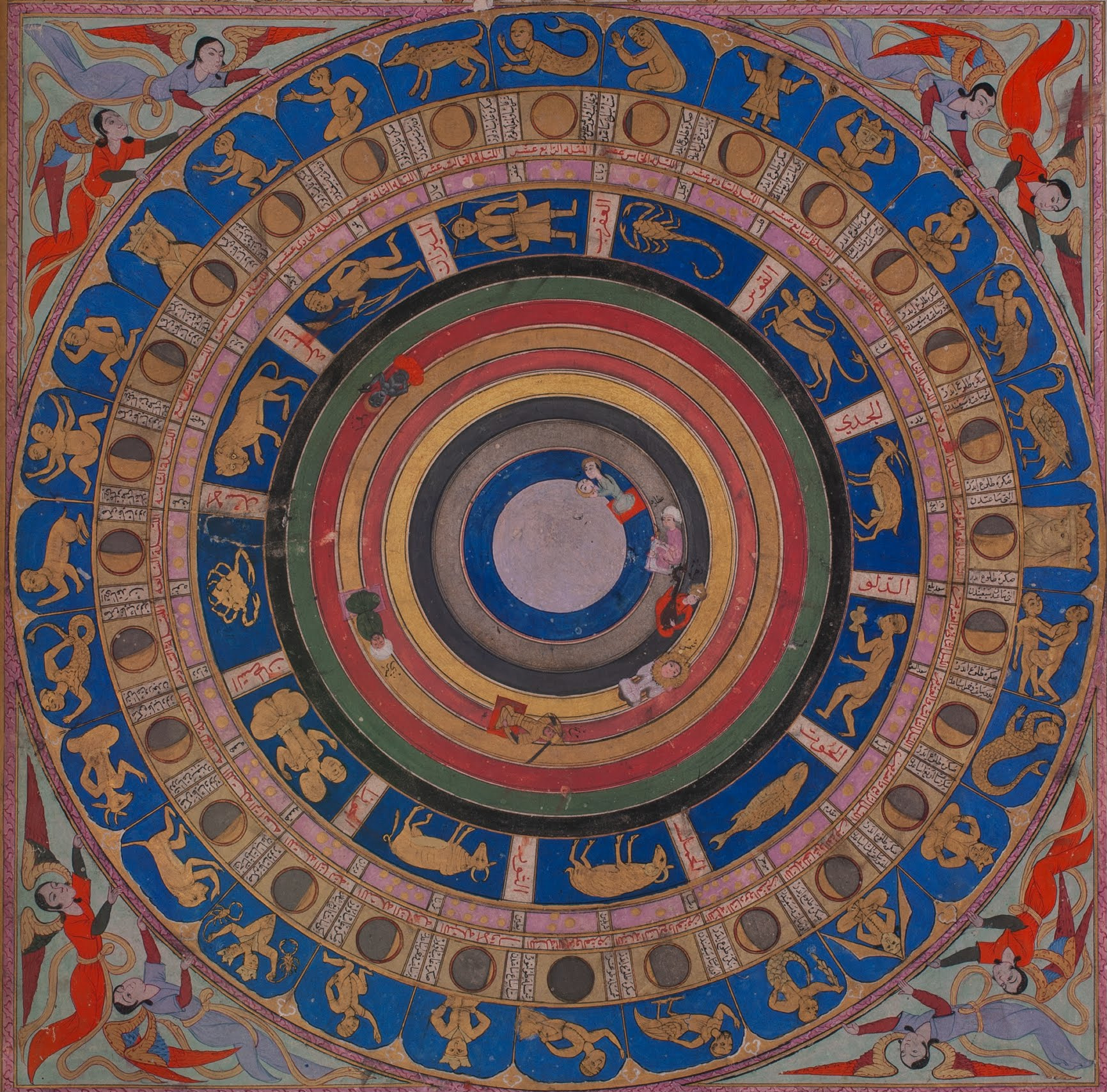
Celestial map, signs of the Zodiac and lunar mansions in the Zubdat al-Tawarikh (Essence of History), dedicated to Ottoman Sultan Murad III in 1583

Astrology was highly prevalent in the Islamic world, as Arabs and, later, the Turco-Mongols who ruled over much of it took a keen interest in its study. This interest arose partly from their belief that celestial bodies played an essential role in human affairs and partly because inhabitants of desert regions often traveled at night, relying on their knowledge of the constellations for guidance.

After the advent of Islam, the Muslims needed to determine the time of the prayers, the direction of the Kaaba, and the correct orientation of the mosque, all of which helped give a religious impetus to the study of astronomy and contributed towards the belief that the heavenly bodies were influential upon terrestrial affairs as well as the human condition. The science dealing with such influences was termed astrology (Arabic: علم النجوم Ilm an-Nujūm), a discipline contained within the field of astronomy (more broadly known as علم الفلك Ilm al-Falak 'the science of formation [of the heavens]'). The principles of these studies were rooted in Arabian, Persian, Babylonian, Hellenistic and Indian traditions and both were developed by the Arabs following their establishment of a magnificent observatory and library of astronomical and astrological texts at Baghdad in the 8th century. From Arabic Caliphates to the later numerous Turks and Mongolian dynasties, consulting astrologers to decide activities was highly popular.

Throughout the medieval period the practical application of astrology was subject to deep philosophical debate by Muslim religious scholars and scientists. Astrological prognostications nevertheless required a fair amount of exact scientific expertise and the quest for such knowledge within this era helped to provide the incentive for the study and development of astronomy.

== Early history ==
Medieval Islamic astrology and astronomy continued Hellenistic and Roman era traditions based on Ptolemy's Almagest. Centres of learning in medicine and astronomy/astrology were set up in Baghdad and Damascus, and the Caliph Al-Mansur of Baghdad established a major observatory and library in the city, making it the world's astronomical centre. During this time knowledge of astronomy was greatly increased, causing many Arabic names to become standard in modern astronomy.

Albumasur or Abu Ma'shar (805–885) was one of the most influential Islamic astrologers. His treatise Introductorium in Astronomiam (Kitab al-Mudkhal al-Kabīr) spoke of how '"only by observing the great diversity of planetary motions can we comprehend the unnumbered varieties of change in this world". The Introductorium was one of the first books to find its way in translation through Spain and into Europe in the Middle Ages, and was highly influential in the revival of astrology and astronomy there.

Persians also combined the disciplines of medicine and astrology by linking the curative properties of herbs with specific zodiac signs and planets. Mars, for instance, was considered hot and dry and so ruled plants with a hot or pungent taste, like hellebore, tobacco or mustard. These beliefs were adopted by European herbalists like Culpeper right up until the development of modern medicine.

The Persians also developed a system, by which the difference between the ascendant and each planet of the zodiac was calculated. This new position then became a 'part' of some kind. For example, the 'part of fortune' is found by taking the difference between the Sun and the ascendant and adding it to the Moon. If the 'part' thus calculated was in the 10th House in Libra, for instance, it suggested that money could be made from some kind of partnership.

The calendar introduced by Omar Khayyam, based on the classical zodiac, remains in effect in Afghanistan and Iran as the official Solar Hijri calendar.

Another notable Persian astrologer and astronomer was Qutb al-Din al Shirazi born in Iran, Shiraz (1236–1311). He wrote critiques of Ptolemy's Almagest and produced two prominent works on astronomy: 'The Limit of Accomplishment Concerning Knowledge of the Heavens' in 1281 and 'The Royal Present' in 1284, both of which commented upon and improved on Ptolemy's work, particularly in the field of planetary motion.

Ulugh Beyg was a fifteenth-century Timurid Sultan and also a mathematician and astronomer. He built an observatory in 1428 and produced the first original star map since Ptolemy, which corrected the position of many stars and included many new ones.

== Medieval understanding ==
Some of the principles of astrology were refuted by several Astronomy in the medieval Islamic astronomers such as Al-Farabi (Alpharabius), Ibn al-Haytham (Alhazen), Avicenna, Abu Rayhan al-Biruni and Averroes. Their reasons for refuting astrology were often due to both scientific (the methods used by astrologers being conjectural rather than empirical) and religious (conflicts with orthodox Islamic scholars) reasons. However these refutations mainly concerned the judicial branches of astrology rather than the natural principles of it. For example, Avicenna's refutation of astrology (in the treatise titled Resāla fī ebṭāl aḥkām al-nojūm, Treatise against the rulings of the stars) revealed support for its overarching principles. He stated that it was true that each planet had some influence on the earth, but his argument was the difficulty of astrologers being able to determine the exact effect of it. In essence, Avicenna did not refute astrology, but denied man's limited capacity to be able to know the precise effects of the stars on the sublunar matter. With that, he did not refute the essential dogma of astrology, but only refuted our ability to fully understand it.

Another Damascene proto-Salafist Ibn Qayyim Al-Jawziyya (1292–1350), in his Miftah Dar al-Sa'adah, used empirical arguments against astrology in order to refute its practice as he thought it is closely aligned to divination. He recognized that the stars are much larger than the planets, and thus argued:

And if you astrologers answer that it is precisely because of this distance and smallness that their influences are negligible, then why is it that you claim a great influence for the smallest heavenly body, Mercury? Why is it that you have given an influence to al-Ra's and al-Dhanab, which are two imaginary points [ascending and descending nodes]?

Ibn Qayyim also argued that the since the Milky Way as "a myriad of tiny stars packed together in the sphere of the fixed stars" that "it is certainly impossible to have knowledge of their influences."

== See also ==
- Astronomy in the medieval Islamic world
- Christian views on astrology
- Hellenistic astrology
- Horary astrology
- Islam and astrology
- Jewish views on astrology
- List of astrologers
- Natal astrology
- Superstitions in Muslim societies
