= Medical astrology =

Astrology of the human physiology

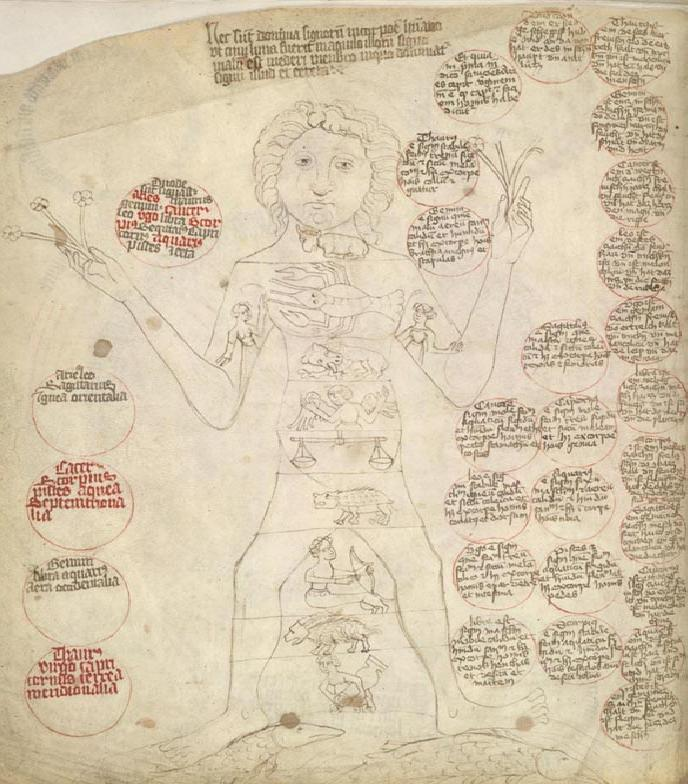
A 1410 illustration of Zodiac Man (homo signorum) showing the anciently held link between the 12 signs of the Zodiac and the various parts of the body

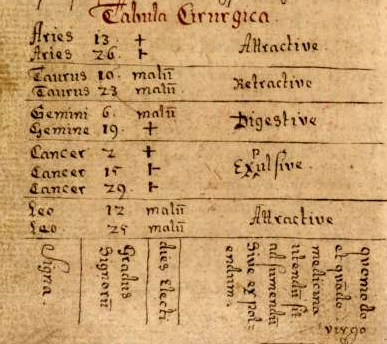
This table, from an 18th-century Icelandic manuscript, links astrological dates with the preparation of medicine.

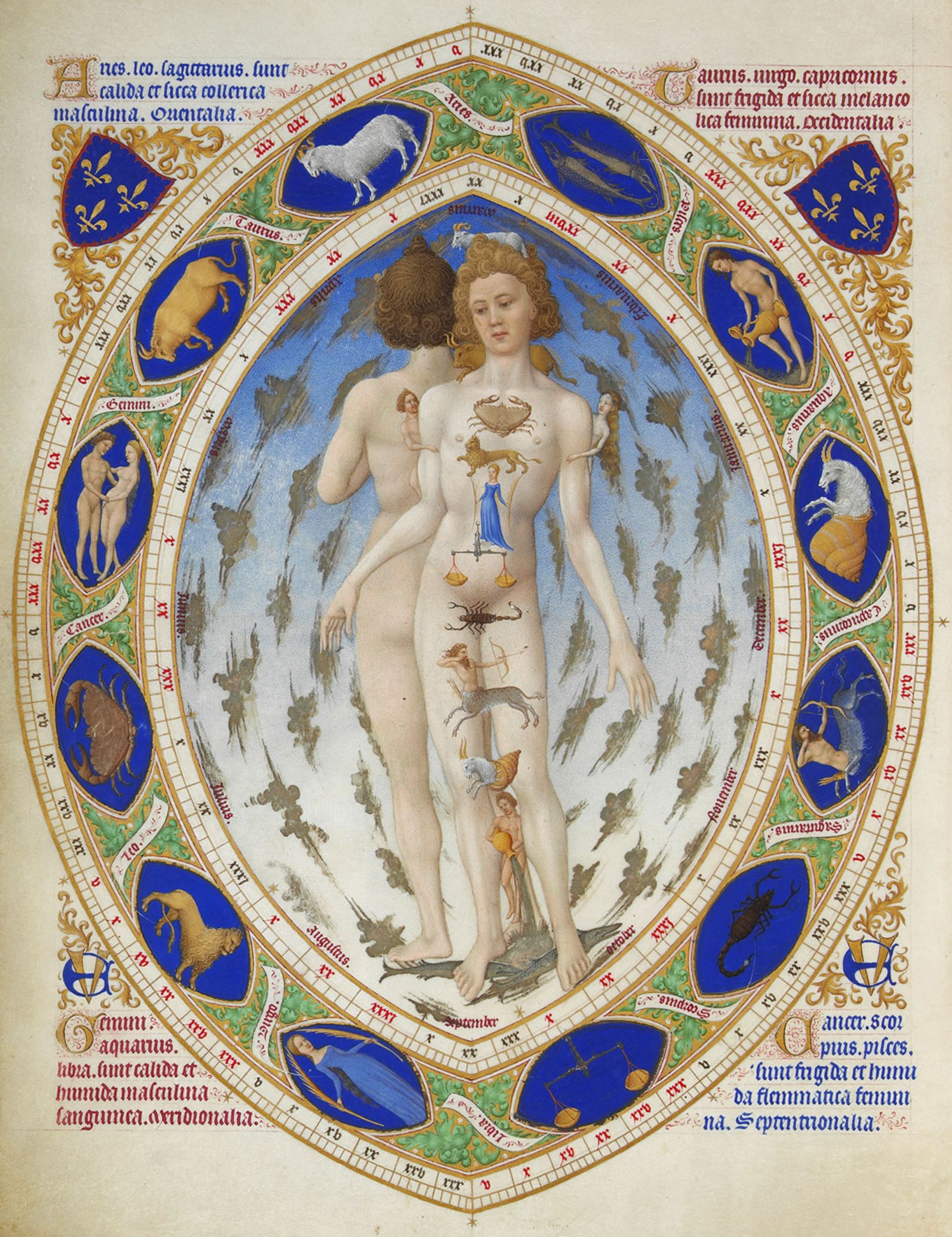
The anatomical-astrological human

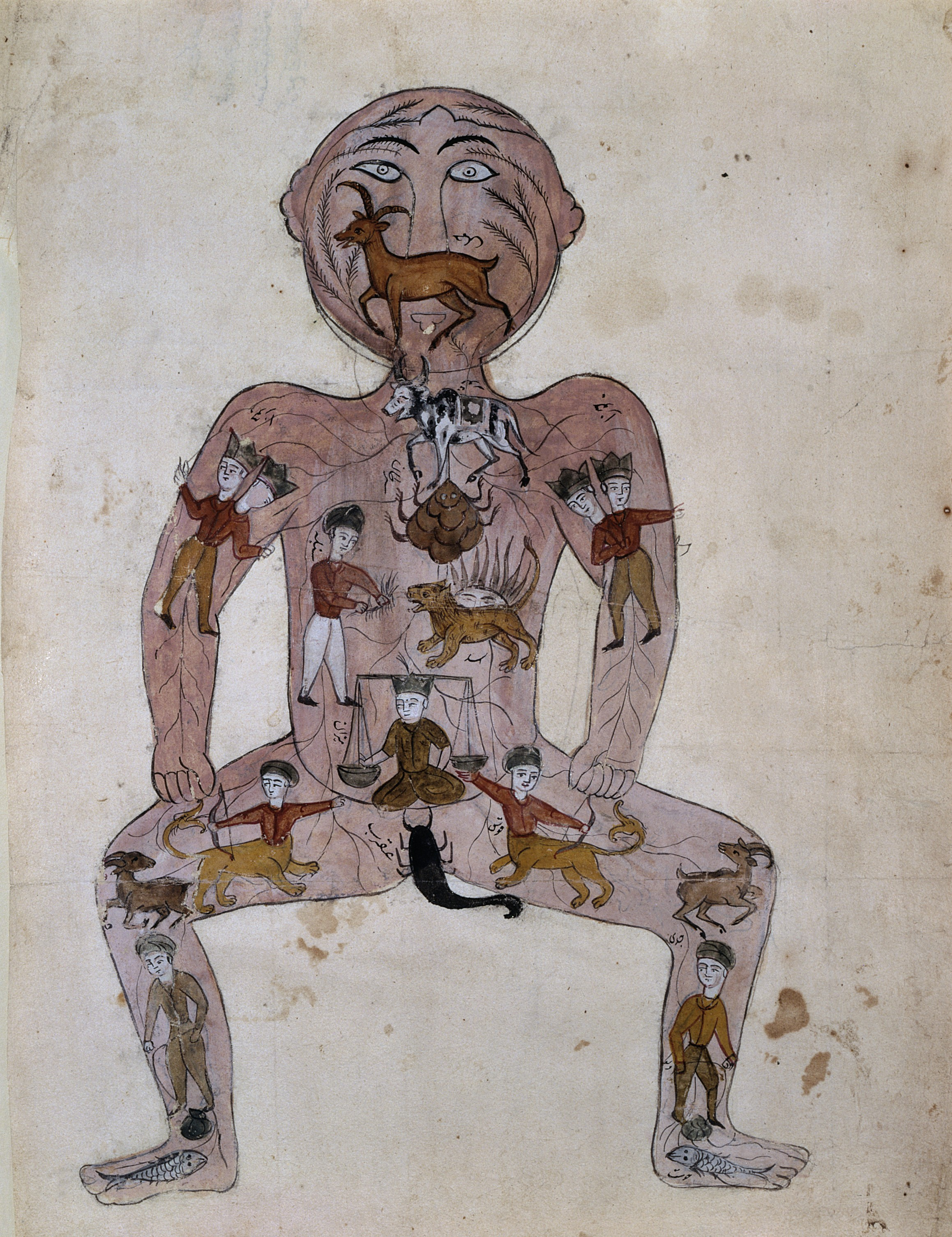
Illustration showing a Zodiac man. Persian annotations on the image. Diagram in a Persian MSS of the Zakhireye Khwarazmshahi of al-Jurjani and Tashrih-i Mansuri of Mansur.

Medical astrology or astrological medicine (traditionally known as iatromathematics) is an ancient applied branch of astrology based mostly on melothesia (Gr. μελοθεσία), the association of various parts of the body, diseases, and drugs with the nature of the sun, moon, planets, and the twelve astrological signs. The underlying basis for medical astrology is considered to be a pseudoscience as there is no scientific basis for its core beliefs.

Hippocratic Greek medical training included a doctrine of dies decretorii ("critical days"). Galen believed that heavenly bodies influenced human life but he had his misgivings about the predictions made by "horoscope-casters" (genethliakoi). Astrology was however considered as a foundation for medical practice in ancient Greece and Arabia. In Italy astrological studies as part of a training for medicine was routine in Bologna. The training was not that strong in England but in medical practice astrological circumstances were claimed in cases to absolve surgeons of any blame. In England, Robert Fludd in his Medicina Catholica (Frankfort, 1629) noted that medicine, theology, and astrology formed a single unified discipline. Astrological medicine declined after the 17th century but there were calls for its renewal in 1928 by Rudyard Kipling who considered modern medicine too narrow.

== List of works ==
- Medical astrology was mentioned by Marcus Manilius (1st century AD) in his epic poem (8000 verses) Astronomica.
- Ficino, Marsilio, Three Books on Life (1489) [De vita libri tre] translated by Carol V. Kaske and John R. Clark, Center for Medieval and Early Renaissance Studies, State University of New York at Binghamton and The Rneaissance Society of America (1989.) ISBN 0-86698-041-5
- Lilly, William, Christian Astrology (1647)
- Culpepper, Nicholas, Astrological Judgement of Diseases from the Decumbiture of the Sick (1655) ISBN 1-5381-0113-0
- Saunders, Richard, The Astrological Judgment and Practice of Physick (1677) ISBN 1-161-41322-7
- Cornell, H.L., M.D., The Encyclopaedia of Medical Astrology (1933), Astrology Classics [Abington, MD, 2010.]
