= Firdaria =

Traditional astrological system of planetary periods

Firdaria (singular firdar; Persian: فردار, romanized: fardār, fardār or firdār) is a traditional astrological time-lord technique that divides a person's life into successive periods ruled by the seven classical planets and the two lunar nodes. Each planet governs a fixed number of years and is treated as the principal time lord of that phase of life. The planetary major periods are further divided into seven sub-periods, each assigned to a participating planet.

Firdaria belongs to the predictive methods of natal astrology. Unlike primary directions, which depend on the calculated movement of significators through a horoscope, the lengths and order of the firdar periods are fixed. Only the starting point differs according to whether the nativity is diurnal or nocturnal.

== Terminology and origin ==
The term occurs in Persian and Arabic sources in forms including fardār, firdār and fardāriyya, with the Arabic plural fardāriyyāt (فرداریات). Through medieval Arabic-to-Latin translations it entered Latin astrological literature in such forms as alfridaria.

Both the etymology of the word and the precise origin of the technique are uncertain. The word has sometimes been derived, through Middle Persian, from the Greek periodos (“period”), but this derivation has been described by modern scholars as conjectural. Martin Gansten characterizes the fardārāt as fixed planetary periods, probably of medieval Persian origin, while noting that neither the origin of the system nor the etymology of its name has been established conclusively.

The best-documented early form of the system appears in the works of the ninth-century Persian astrologer Abu Ma'shar al-Balkhi. Abu Ma'shar lists unequal periods assigned to the planets, followed by the Head and Tail of the Dragon, amounting to a total of 75 years. The method was subsequently described by al-Biruni in the Book of Instruction in the Elements of the Art of Astrology and by the eleventh-century Persian author Shāhmardān ibn Abī al-Khayr Rāzī in the Rawḍat al-munajjimīn.

The technique later entered European astrology through Latin translations of Arabic astrological works. It was discussed in the thirteenth century by the Italian astrologer Guido Bonatti, whose account became influential in later European practice.

== Length of the periods ==
Each of the seven classical planets is assigned a fixed major period. The seven planetary periods total 70 years. The three years assigned to the ascending lunar node and the two years assigned to the descending node bring the full cycle to 75 years.

Fixed lengths of the firdar periods
| Planet or point | Length |
|---|---|
| Sun | 10 years |
| Venus | 8 years |
| Mercury | 13 years |
| Moon | 9 years |
| Saturn | 11 years |
| Jupiter | 12 years |
| Mars | 7 years |
| North node or Head | 3 years |
| South node or Tail | 2 years |

Shāhmardān explains the numerical arrangement as an ascending series centred on the Sun: Mars receives seven years, Venus eight, the Moon nine, the Sun ten, Saturn eleven, Jupiter twelve and Mercury thirteen. The seven planets therefore account for 70 years. The three years of the Head and two years of the Tail complete the 75-year cycle.

Historical texts also refer to larger classes of fardars used in mundane astrology for dynasties, political changes and periods of world history. The 75-year cycle is the smallest form and is the one principally employed in natal astrology.

== Diurnal and nocturnal sequences ==
Whether a nativity is diurnal or nocturnal is determined by the position of the Sun relative to the horizon. A birth with the Sun above the horizon begins with the Sun, whereas one with the Sun below the horizon begins with the Moon.

In the version attributed to Abu Ma'shar and found in the Rawḍat al-munajjimīn, both sequences complete the periods of all seven planets before proceeding to the lunar nodes.

Major firdar periods
| Order | Diurnal nativity | | Nocturnal nativity | |
| Order | Ruler | Age | Ruler | Age |
|---|---|---|---|---|
| 1 | Sun | Birth–10 | Moon | Birth–9 |
| 2 | Venus | 10–18 | Saturn | 9–20 |
| 3 | Mercury | 18–31 | Jupiter | 20–32 |
| 4 | Moon | 31–40 | Mars | 32–39 |
| 5 | Saturn | 40–51 | Sun | 39–49 |
| 6 | Jupiter | 51–63 | Venus | 49–57 |
| 7 | Mars | 63–70 | Mercury | 57–70 |
| 8 | North node | 70–73 | North node | 70–73 |
| 9 | South node | 73–75 | South node | 73–75 |

After the age of 75, the cycle begins again with the Sun in a diurnal nativity or the Moon in a nocturnal nativity.

== Sub-periods ==
Each planetary major period is divided into seven equal sub-periods. Shāhmardān calls the subordinate rulers anbāzān (Persian: انبازان), meaning “partners” or “participants”. The first sub-period belongs to the ruler of the major period itself. The remaining planets then participate in their established cyclical order.

For example, the sub-period rulers within the Sun's ten-year firdar are:

1. Sun;
2. Venus;
3. Mercury;
4. Moon;
5. Saturn;
6. Jupiter;
7. Mars.

The Venus firdar begins with a Venus–Venus sub-period, followed by Mercury, the Moon, Saturn, Jupiter, Mars and the Sun. The same rotation is applied to the other planetary periods. The duration of each sub-period is one-seventh of the length of its major period.

In the early Persian and Abu Ma'shar traditions, the periods of the lunar nodes are not divided into seven planetary sub-periods. Abu Ma'shar explains that the nodes do not participate with the planets in the same manner because they possess no zodiacal domiciles.

== Interpretation ==
In traditional practice, a firdar ruler is not interpreted solely from the planet's general nature. Its placement in the natal horoscope, its house and zodiacal sign, its aspects, its dignities, and its condition relative to benefic and malefic planets are also considered. The major-period ruler is treated as the principal indicator of the period, while the sub-period ruler modifies the way in which its indications are manifested.

Shāhmardān warns that judging a year from the firdaria table alone produces an excessively general result. He states that the astrologer should examine the natal condition of both the major ruler and its participating sub-ruler, including their strength, weakness and relations with benefic and malefic planets. He observes that people born by day or by night do not all experience identical events merely because they share the same sequence of period rulers.

== Placement of the lunar nodes ==
The principal disagreement among surviving versions concerns the placement of the lunar nodes in nocturnal nativities. Abu Ma'shar's fuller account and Shāhmardān's Persian tables place the nodes after Mercury, once the periods of all seven planets have been completed. Thus, in both diurnal and nocturnal nativities, the nodes govern ages 70 to 75.

Bonatti's description of the nocturnal sequence is less explicit. A reading of his statement that the nocturnal arrangement follows the diurnal arrangement “in all respects” has led some later interpreters to insert the North and South nodes immediately after the Mars period. Under this variant, the nocturnal sequence becomes Moon, Saturn, Jupiter, Mars, North node, South node, Sun, Venus and Mercury. The two versions consequently give different time lords for nocturnal nativities after the end of the Mars period at age 39.

== See also ==
- Persian astrology
- Natal astrology
- Primary direction (astrology)
- Profection
- Solar return
- Chronocrator
