= NCGR =

NCGR may refer to:

- National Center for Genome Resources, Santa Fe, New Mexico
- National Commission for Government Reforms, Pakistan
- National Council for Geocosmic Research
