= Bhavartha Ratnakara =

Predictive vedic astrology by Ramanuja

- Author: Ramanuja
- Language: Sanskrit
- Subject: Astrology
- Publication place: India

Bhavartha Ratnakara was formerly a little-known Sanskrit treatise on the predictive part of Hindu astrology which is believed to have been written by Ramanuja, it had for a very long time remained confined mainly to the southern parts of India. It was in the year 1900 that Raman Publications, Bangalore, published this text along with its translation into English and comments by Bangalore Venkata Raman, the 10th Edition of which translation was published in 1992 followed by another edition in 1997.

Bhavartha Ratnakara does not cover the entire Phalita portion of Hindu astrology as do other standard texts but selectively lists rules some of which are not to be found in other more renowned texts e.g. the rule which states that a person will be fortunate in respect of that bhava whose karaka is situated in the 12th house from the Ascendant. Scholars have found many of these rules to be effective and revealing e.g. a) the situation of Jupiter in the 8th as the lord of the 9th house, Saturn casting its aspect on the 9th from the 7th house giving rise to yoga during the course of its own dasha, b) Saturn as the simultaneous lord of the 8th and the 9th not acting as an outright benefic giving mixed results only, c) Saturn as lord of the 4th situated in the 2nd house in conjunction with Venus and Mercury granting proficiency in poetry, d) Venus situated in the 12th house from the Ascendant producing good results and affluence as also when occupying the 6th house. and an exalted planet situated either in the 5th or in the 9th house giving rise to Dhana yoga, making one wealthy, fortunate and famous.

Bhavartha Ratnakara has 384 slokas or verses presented in fourteen Tarangas or Chapters, the First Chapter being the longest containing 130 slokas. It is in this chapter that Ramanuja says that Saturn is not a yogakaraka for Taurus Lagna in spite of the fact that he simultaneously owns the 9th and the 10th bhava. The Second Chapter deals with Dhana yogas, poverty and gain of education. The Third Chapter deals with brothers and the Fourth, with combinations for owning vehicles and general fortune. The Sixth and the Seventh Chapters are inter-linked and in the Eighth Chapter Fortunate Combinations are discussed. The Ninth Chapter deals with Raja yogas and Punya yogas. The Tenth Chapter lists important combinations which enable one to predict the dasha or antra-dasha during whose course death is likely to occur. The Eleventh Chapter gives information about planetary dashas and results. The Twelfth Chapter lists combinations conferring strength to bhavas or harming the bhavas, and in the Thirteenth Chapter are listed some Malika yogas. The last chapter deals with the fundamental principles of Hindu astrology.
