= Dennis Rawlins =

American astronomer and historian (born 1937)

- Born: 1937 (age 88–89); Baltimore, Maryland, United States
- Occupations: Astronomer, historian

Dennis Rawlins (born 1937) is an American astronomer and historian who has acquired the reputation of skeptic primarily with respect to historical claims connected to astronomical considerations. He is known to the public mostly from media coverage of his investigations into two early twentieth-century North Pole expeditions. In his first book, Peary at the North Pole: fact or fiction? (1973), Rawlins argued that Robert Peary never made it to the North Pole in 1909. His second book (1993) is an edition of Tycho Brahe's 1598 catalogue of 1004 stars which detected ten star places that were fabricated, partially or entirely. In 1976, as the only astronomer on the Committee for Skeptical Inquiry, he looked into the purported Mars effect. In 1996 he made headlines when page one of the New York Times covered his report to Ohio State University which concluded that in 1926 Richard E. Byrd's airplane flight towards the North Pole turned back 150 miles from the pole. Rawlins's third book, his detailed report on Byrd's trip and on the competence of lingering defenses of it, was co-published simultaneously in 2000 by DIO volume 10, 2000 and by the polar research center at the University of Cambridge. Because explorer Frederick Cook's story of reaching the North Pole in 1908 is generally rejected, the elimination of Peary and Byrd leaves fourth North Pole claimant Roald Amundsen as first there in 1926 in the airship Norge (Norwegian for Norway). Having attained the South Pole in 1911, Amundsen thus became the first to reach each geographical pole of the earth, as proposed in Rawlins's 1973 book.

== Selected works ==
- Rawlins, Dennis (1973). Peary at the North Pole: fact or fiction?. Washington: Robert B. Luce. ISBN 0883310422.
