= Mars effect =

Purported correlation between athletic ability and the position of Mars at birth

A Gauquelin diagram mapping incidence of birth time and latitude to the natal position of Mars relative to the ecliptic of the rotating Earth, showing peaks just after its daily rising and culmination in mid-heaven (horizon and mid-heaven are marked by perpendicular lines). The orbit of Mars in the sky has been represented by 12 sectors in the circle, 6 above the horizon and 6 below. The drawn line shows the purported higher birth incidence of sports champions in the key sectors 1 and 4 of Mars' orbit.

The Mars effect is a purported statistical correlation between athletic eminence and the position of the planet Mars relative to the horizon at time and place of birth. This controversial finding was first reported by the French psychologist and "neo-astrologer" Michel Gauquelin. In his book L'influence des astres ("The Influence of the Stars", 1955), Gauquelin suggested that a statistically significant number of sports champions were born just after the planet Mars rises or culminates. He also divided the plane of the ecliptic into twelve sectors, identifying two "key" sectors of statistical significance.

Gauquelin's work was accepted by the psychologist Hans Eysenck among others but later attempts to validate the data and replicate the effect have produced uneven results, chiefly owing to disagreements over the selection and analysis of the data set. Since the phenomenon in question depends upon the daily rotation of the Earth, the availability and accuracy of time and place of birth data is crucial to such studies, as is the criterion of "eminence". Gauqelin would later coin this term as "astrobiology". Later research claims to explain the Mars effect by selection bias, favouring champions who were born in a key sector of Mars and rejecting those who were not from the sample.

== Reception and replication ==
Gauquelin's work was not limited to the Mars effect: his calculations led him first to reject most of the conventions of natal astrology as it is practised in the modern west but he singled out "highly significant statistical correlations between planetary positions and the birth times of eminently successful people." This claim concerned not only Mars but five planets, correlated with eminence in fields broadly compatible with the traditional "planetary rulerships" of astrology. However, partly because eminence in sport is more quantifiable, later research, publicity and controversy has tended to single out the "Mars effect".

=== Belgian athletes – the Comité Para ===
In 1956 Gauquelin invited the Belgian Comité Para to review his findings but it was not until 1962 that Jean Dath corroborated the statistics Gauquelin had presented and suggested an attempt at duplication using Belgian athletes. By this time Gauquelin had published Les Hommes et Les Astres (Men and the Stars, 1960), offering further data. The Comité Para tested the Mars effect in 1967 and replicated it, though most of the data (473 of 535) were still collected by Gauquelin himself. The committee, suspecting that the results might have been an artifact, withheld its findings for a further eight years, then cited unspecified “demographic errors” in its findings. Unpublished internal analyses contradicted this and one committee member, Luc de Marré, resigned in protest. In 1983 Abell, Kurtz and Zelen (see below) published a reappraisal, rejecting the idea of demographic errors, saying, “Gauquelin adequately allowed for demographic and astronomical factors in predicting the expected distribution of Mars sectors for birth times in the general population.”

=== The Zelen test ===
In 1975 Paul Kurtz's journal The Humanist published an article on astrology criticizing Gauquelin, to which the latter and his wife Françoise responded. Then Professor Marvin Zelen, a statistician and associate of the recently founded Committee for the Scientific Investigation of Claims of the Paranormal (CSICOP, now known as the Committee for Skeptical Inquiry (CSI)), proposed in a 1976 article in the same periodical that, in order to eliminate any demographic anomaly, Gauquelin randomly pick 100 athletes from his data-set of 2,088 and check the birth/planet correlations of a sample of babies born at the same times and places in order to establish a control group, giving the base-rate (chance) expectation for comparison (The 100 random athletes later expanded into a subsample of 303 athletes).

In April 1977 CSICOP researcher George O. Abell wrote to Kurtz stating that Zelen's test had come out in the Gauquelins' favour. The Gauquelins also performed the test that Professor Zelen had proposed and carried out and found that the chance Mars-in-key-sector expectation for the general population (i.e., non-champions) was about 17%, significantly less than the 22% observed for athletic champions. However the subsequent article by Zelen, Abell and Kurtz did not clearly state this outcome but rather questioned the original data. In a rebuttal of the Gauquelins' published conclusion, Marvin Zelen analysed the composition, not of the 17,000 non-champions of the control group, but of the 303 champions, splitting this secondary subsample (which was already nearly too small to test 22% vs 17%) by eliminating female athletes, a subgroup that gave the results most favourable to Gauquelin, and dividing the remaining athletes into city/rural sections and Parisian/non-Parisian sections.

Before and after publication of Zelen's results astronomer and charter CSICOP member Dennis Rawlins, the CSICOP Council's only astronomer at the time, repeatedly objected to the procedure and to CSICOP's subsequent reporting of it. Rawlins privately urged that the Gauquelins' results were valid and the “Zelen test” could only uphold this and that Zelen had diverted from the original purpose of the control test, which was to check the base rate of births with Mars in the "key" sectors. It appeared to him that the test had minimised the significance of the Mars/key-sector correlations with athletes by splitting the sample of athletes and that the experimenters, who were supposed to be upholding scientific standards, were actually distorting and manipulating evidence to conceal the result of an ill-considered test.

The Kurtz-Zelen-Abell analysis had split the sample primarily to examine the randomness of the 303 selected champions, the non-randomness of which Rawlins demonstrated in 1975 and 1977. Zelen's 1976 "Challenge to Gauquelin" had stated: "We now have an objective way for unambiguous corroboration or disconfirmation ... to settle this question", whereas this aim was now disputed. Rawlins made procedural objections, stating; "... we find an inverse correlation between size and deviation in the Mars-athletes subsamples (that is, the smaller the subsample, the larger the success) – which is what one would expect if bias had infected the blocking off of the sizes of the subsamples".

CSICOP also contended, after reviewing the results, that the Gauquelins had not chosen randomly. They had had difficulty finding sufficient same-week and same-village births to compare with champions born in rural areas and so had chosen only champions born in larger cities. The Gauquelins' original total list of about 2,088 champions had included 42 Parisians and their subsample of 303 athletes also included 42 Parisians. Further, Paris is divided into 20 arrondissements, different economic classes and ethnic groups typically inhabiting different arrondissements. The Gauquelins had compared the 42 Parisian champions (who had been born throughout Paris) to non-champions of only one arrondissement. If the 22% correlation was an artifact partly based on factors such as rural recordkeeping, economic, class or ethnic differences in birth patterns, this fact would be blurred by this non-random selection.

=== U.S. athletes – CSICOP ===
At the same time CSICOP began a study of U.S. athletes in consultation with Zelen, Abell and Rawlins. The results, published in 1979 showed a negative result. Gauquelin contended the KZA group demonstrated an overall preference for mediocre athletes and ignored his criteria of eminence and that they included basketball players and people born after 1950.

=== CFEPP test ===
In 1994 the results of a major study undertaken by the Committee for the Study of Paranormal Phenomena (Comité pour l’Étude des Phénomènes Paranormaux, or CFEPP) in France found no evidence whatsoever of a "Mars Effect" in the births of athletes. The study had been proposed in 1982 and the committee had agreed in advance to use the protocol upon which Gauquelin insisted. The CFEPP report was “leaked” to the Dutch newspaper Trouw.

In 1990 the CFEPP had issued a preliminary report on the study, which used 1,066 French sports champions, giving full data for the 1,066 as well as the names of 373 who fit the criteria but for whom birth times were unavailable, discussing methodology and listing data-selection criteria. In 1996 the report, with a commentary by J. W. Nienhuys and several letters from Gauquelin to the committee, was published in book form as The Mars Effect – A French Test of Over 1,000 Sports Champions. The CFEPP stated that its experiment showed no effect and concluded that the effect was attributable to bias in Gauquelin's data selection, pointing to the suggestions made by Gauquelin to the committee for changes in their list of athletes. The CFEPP report was criticized by Suitbert Ertel on similar grounds as the American study – for including too many mediocre athletes – and also for using a too high chance-expectancy level. According to Ertel, a Mars effect could be detected by dividing the athletes into groups of eminence grading.

=== Statistical explanation ===
Some researchers argued that Gauquelin did not adjust the statistical significance of the Mars Effect for multiple comparisons and did not address the issue in his publications. Simplified and illustrative showcase argument is explained here: There are 10 celestial bodies and 12 sectors for them to be in. Furthermore, there are 132 combinations of sector pairs and thus 1320 different combinations of a planet with two sectors. There is about a 25% chance to find at least one such combination (of one planet and two sectors) for a random dataset of the same size as Gauquelin's that would yield a result with apparent statistical significance like the one obtained by Gauquelin. This implies that after adjusting for multiple comparisons, the Mars effect is no longer statistically significant even at the modest significance level of 0.05 and is probably a false positive. But the multiple comparisons argument is countered or weakened if it is proven that an effect shows up in more than one study. Some argue that the latter is the case.

Geoffrey Dean has suggested that the effect may be caused by self-reporting of birth dates by parents rather than any issue with the study by Gauquelin. Gauquelin had failed to find the Mars effect in populations after 1950. Dean has put forward the idea that this may be due to increases in doctors reporting the time of birth rather than parents. Information about misreporting was unavailable to Gauquelin at the time. Dean had said that misreporting by 3% of the sample would explain the result.

== See also ==
- Scientific skepticism
- Outliers: The Story of Success - offers a simple explanation to a specific known relationship between season of birth and success in Canadian hockey leagues
