= Natal astrology =

Form of astrology based on time of birth

Natal astrology, also known as genethliac astrology or genethlialogy, is a system of astrology that claims to shed light on an individual’s personality, path in life or fundamental relationship dynamics with others based on constructing a horoscope or natal chart that includes the exact date, time, and location of an individual's birth. Natal astrology is found in the Indian, Chinese, Hellenistic and Western astrological traditions.

A horoscope illustrates the positions of the Sun, Moon, planets, Ascendant, Midheaven, Descendant and Imum Coeli as well as the aspects or angles between them. Interpretation includes noting the placement and significance of important features. Chart Weighting analyzes Zodiac Signs and Houses. Chart Shaping analyzes planetary aspect patterns.

In general, astrology is considered to be a pseudoscience by the scientific community. There is little statistical evidence that shows causation between horoscopes and the consequences in a person's life or those that may occur throughout the world.

== Features ==
Within a horoscope, important features of significance may include the planets, aspects, Signs and Houses of the Sun, Moon and Ascendant.

The Ascendant has a very strong influence. It is also known as the Rising Sign or Chart Ruler. This may also include one of the first three houses that follow an Ascendant. If no planet occupies the first three houses, a planet in the twelfth house, that is closest to the Ascendant, may be acknowledged as the Rising Sign.

Planetary aspects that are in Conjunction or adjacent to the primary angles of the Ascendant, Midheaven, Descendant and Immum Coeli may also be important features.

== Chart weighting ==
Chart weighting analyzes significant categories. This may include the Signs and Houses of the Sun, Moon, planets, Ascendant, and Midheaven. For example, if multiple planets are in Fire Signs, the attributes of those signs give more importance or 'weight' to a person's personality.

=== Weighting by sign ===
Chart weighting by sign analyzes masculine or feminine signs as well as elements and their qualities. Elements include fire, earth, air or water. Qualities include cardinal, fixed or mutable.

Some astrologers may only use ten or eleven planets. Others may only include the Ascendant and Midheaven. The modern planets of Uranus, Neptune and Pluto may be excluded, because they influence generations; their positions may not have significance in a person's individual chart.

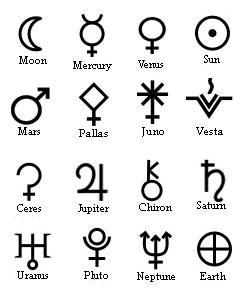
These planets and their astrological glyphs are commonly used in Western astrology.

Sign	Symbol	Element	Quality
Aries		Fire	Cardinal
Taurus		Earth	Fixed
Gemini		Air	Mutable
Cancer		Water	Cardinal
Leo		Fire	Fixed
Virgo		Earth	Mutable
Libra		Air	Cardinal
Scorpio		Water	Fixed
Sagittarius		Fire	Mutable
Capricorn		Earth	Cardinal
Aquarius		Air	Fixed
Pisces		Water	Mutable

- Masculine Signs are Fire and Air Signs. They include Aries, Gemini, Leo, Libra, Sagittarius, and Aquarius. If these signs dominate a Natal Chart, a person may be extroverted, confident or assertive. They solve problems with enterprise and courage.
- Feminine Signs are Earth and Water Signs. They include Taurus, Cancer, Virgo, Scorpio, Capricorn, and Pisces. If these signs dominate a Natal Chart, a person may be introverted, shy or passive. Intuitively, they conserve, nurture and solve problems.
- Fire Signs include Aries, Leo, and Sagittarius. If these signs dominate a Natal Chart, a person may be energetic, enthusiastic or optimistic. They may be in the center of the action making things happen. They are egotistical, headstrong or arrogant, but also generous, warm-hearted or spontaneously kind. They are independent and prefer to control their own lives, but may also be autocratic. If a person lacks Fire Signs, they may be shy, fearful, overly cautious or pessimistic, which may lead to a lack enthusiasm, confidence or faith in the future. To compensate for this lack, Cardinal planets in the 1st, 5th or 9th houses may be helpful.
- Earth Signs include Taurus, Virgo, and Capricorn. If these signs dominate a Natal Chart, a person may be capable, practical, sensible, shrewd or cautious. They prefer concrete things rather than abstract ideas. They carry out their work in a slow, thorough manner. They are careful not to waste time or money. They may be shy and slow to commit in love relationships, but are serious when they do. They are generous to those they love, but may tend towards meanness. They need emotional and material security, but will put up with quite a lot to get it. If a person lacks Earth Signs, they may lack common sense and practicality. They may find it difficult to finish anything they start. They may be unreliable, clumsy, scatty, unrealistic, or hopeless with money. To compensate, planets in the 2nd, 6th or 10th houses in Fixed Signs may be helpful.
- Air Signs include Gemini, Libra, and Aquarius. If these signs dominate a Natal Chart, a person may be an excellent communcicator of a variety of ideas and theories. They are imaginative, quick-witted, and are able to do a number of things at once. They are interested in the latest technologies and look for answers to life's questions. They make good teachers and writers. They have many friends and acquaintances, but may not be interested in family life. They are more tense than they appear and live on their nerves. They may also be sarcastic and rude. If a person lacks Air Signs, they may have difficulty assimilating or explaining new ideas. They may be boring and find it difficult to communicate, because they lack imagination or a sense of humor. They may be too practical. To compensate, planets in the 3rd, 7th and 11th houses in Mutable Signs may be helpful.
- Water Signs include Cancer, Scorpio, and Pisces. If these signs dominate a Natal Chart, a person may be difficult to live with, because they may have difficulty expressing their feelings. They need time to grasp a new concept and may respond slowly. They are very emotional and passionate. They are kind and sympathetic to those they love. They need to give and receive a lot of affection. They direct their affection towards family, close friends and animals. If a person lacks Water Signs, they may not be intuitive to the needs of others. They may be too full of ideas or too fond of the material world to consider their own spiritual needs or those of others. To compensate, planets in the 4th, 8th and 12th houses may be helpful.
- Cardinal Signs include Aries, Cancer, Libra, and Capricorn. If these signs dominate a Natal Chart, a person may take charge of their own world and may not want to be held under anybody's rule. It is difficult to influence or deflect their energy, because they are motivated, courageous and believe they know best. If a person lacks Cardinal Signs, they may feel that they are never in control of their own lives. They may be manipulated by people or circumstances beyond their control. They may prefer others to make decisions for them, because they lack initiative or courage. To compensate, planets in the 1st, 4th, 7th or 10th houses in a Fire or Air Sign may be helpful.
- Fixed Signs include Taurus, Leo, Scorpio, and Aquarius. If these signs dominate a Natal Chart, a person may have strength and endurance to see things through. They prefer the known rather than uncertainty. They need stable homes, careers and partnerships. They are loyal and dependable, but can be very obstinate. If a person lacks Fixed Signs, they may not be able see things through. They may walk away from problems. They may be too easily bored or too busy chasing rainbows to ever accomplish anything. To compensate, planets in the 2nd, 5th, 8th and 11th houses in an Earth Sign may be helpful.
- Mutable Signs include Gemini, Virgo, Sagittarius, and Pisces. If these signs dominate a Natal Chart, a person may devote their lives to helping others, because they are friendly, cooperative and adaptable. They can fit into almost any situation, put up with anything and turn any situation to their advantage. They can steer projects through periods of transition and bring them to a successful conclusion. Although gentle and likeable, they seem to have more than their fair share of problems. They may also be selfish and ruthless. If a person lacks Mutable Signs, their views may be rigid and difficult to change. They may lack flexibility and have difficulty adapting to change. They may be particularly unhappy when faced with uncertainty. They need much notice before they commit to anything. To compensate, planets in the 3rd, 6th, 9th and 12th houses in Water Signs may be helpful.

=== Chart Signature ===
A Chart Signature summarizes the process of weighting with a single Zodiac Sign. This involves noting which element and quality has the most signs and then combining them into a single Zodiac Sign, which is acknowledged as the Signature Sign of the chart. In a Natal Chart, a Signature Sign may have more influence than any other sign.

For example, if a chart has more Fire Signs than any other element and more Fixed Signs than any other quality, then Leo is acknowledged as the Signature Sign of that chart, because it is a Fixed Fire Sign.

If there are no majorities in element or quality, the sign of the ruling planets of the Sun or Ascendant may be added. For example, if the Sun is in Taurus, the sign of its ruling planet of Venus is added to its appropriate element and quality. If Venus is also in Pisces, the sign that occupies Pisces is also added in the same way.

=== Weighting by House ===
- Angular Houses include the 1st, 4th, 7th, and 10th Houses. Planets in these Houses exert a strong influence. They may compensate for a lack of strength, courage, enthusiasm, and Cardinal Signs in a chart.
- Succedent Houses include the 2nd, 5th, 8th and 11th Houses. Planets in these Houses involve creativity and possessions, which may include others. They may compensate for a lack of Fixed Signs in a chart.
- Cadent Houses include the 3rd, 6th, 9th and 12th Houses. Planets in these Houses develop aptitude and unique talent. They may compensate for a lack of adaptability and Mutable Signs in a chart.

== Chart shaping ==
Ascendant is abbreviated as Asc. It is in the traditional nine o'clock position of a horoscope.

Chart shaping involves examining the placement of the planets in the chart by the aspects they form and by their positioning in the chart relative to one another. Any significant patterns or 'shapes' which occur in the chart are then interpreted for their importance to the personality of the native.

=== Aspect patterns ===
While the astrologer must note every aspect formed by the planets, aspects can be grouped together into larger patterns which must be given particular attention in the chart. The main aspect patterns are as follows:

- Stellium: At least three planets linked together in a series of continuous conjunctions. The planets will act as if they are all in conjunction with each other, even if not all of them actually are. This pattern gives a huge emphasis to the sign occupied by the planets, regardless of the sun sign.
- Grand trine: Three trine aspects together. Indicative of a person at ease with him or herself, with strong inner harmony, talents and abilities. However it may make a person unable to cope with any real adversity, and may produce a weak, apathetic and condescending character.
- Grand cross: Two pairs of opposing planets squared to each other. Often proves to be a "make or break" pattern; either the person develops unusual strength of character, or feels crushed by life. Person will have "a cross to bear".
- T-Square: Two planets in opposition squared to a third. The tension typical of the opposition aspect is aggravated by additional problems introduced by the third planet. Often an obstructive feature blocking the normal flow of behaviour of the person. Person needs to develop activities represented by the "missing" arm of the T-square to achieve wholeness.
- Yod: Two quincunxes together joined by a sextile. It indicates restlessness and instability. The person gets drawn into the lives of others in ways that are difficult to avoid, with periodic crises and urgent calls for assistance.

=== Hemispheres ===
The houses are grouped into four main categories or hemispheres. Horoscopes appear 'upside down' in relation to how the compass points usually appear, with the ascendant marking the eastern horizon traditionally appearing on the left hand side. For this reason the southern hemisphere appears in the upper part of the horoscope.

- Upper (southern) hemisphere The 7th, 8th, 9th 10th, 11th and 12th houses. A subject with most of his or her planets in this hemisphere will not be too deeply affected by the actions of other people. He or she will be able to distance themselves from those around them and from public events and movements, focusing firmly on their own needs and feelings, or the general cause of humanity that is important to them. If the planets are grouped in the 8th, 9th or 12th houses, the subject will have strong spiritual needs and values. Planets grouped in the 10th house will make the subject ambitious and politically astute; while if they are in the 11th house he or she will be interested in humanitarian causes and education.
- Lower (northern) hemisphere The 1st, 2nd, 3rd, 4th, 5th and 6th houses. A subject with most of his or her planets in this part of the chart will be sensitive to the moods and feelings of others, and may suffer a good deal as a result. The person may try to live through their family rather than for themselves, and may be too subjective in their thinking. They may also choose to do most of their thinking and working at home.
- Eastern hemisphere The 10th, 11th, 12th, 1st, 2nd, 3rd houses. A subject who has most of his or her planets in this hemisphere will be a self-starter who chooses their own path through life and sets their own boundaries. They are not happy being a burden to other people, or being kept by someone else. They also have the burden themselves of being an initiator at work and in their personal life, as little is likely to be done for them by others. When the planets are in the 1st, 2nd and 3rd houses, the subject is likely to be very self-absorbed and convinced that his or her own opinions are the only ones that matter.
- Western hemisphere The 4th, 5th, 6th, 7th, 8th, and 9th houses. A subject with most of these planets in this hemisphere will need to be very diplomatic in order to keep those around him on their side. They may be looked after in some way by others, or else spend their lives supporting and motivating others. When the majority of planets are in the 6th, 7th and 8th houses he or she will use their energy to fulfil the needs to others. The subject may bring about a situation of being needed by bringing a number of children into the world to love and care for.

=== Jones patterns ===
The American astrologer Marc Edmund Jones has listed seven significant patterns which also occur in the chart, based on the positions of the planets relative to one another.

- Bundle : In this pattern the planets are grouped together so that they form a 'bundle' within the space of 120 degrees, or the equivalent of four signs of the zodiac. This intense concentration of planets produces a person who is equally intense and unrelenting in pursuit of personal interests. Perspective and understanding of others is limited, and it is difficult for this person to share their lives with anyone. The best course of life for such a person is to enter into enterprises that require deep concentration, persistence and commitment, or to specialise in one area of expertise.
- Bowl : In this pattern the planets are grouped into a 'bowl' of one hemisphere of 180 degrees, or the equivalent of six zodiac signs. The pattern will have particular force if all the planets are contained within one hemisphere. A person with this pattern will be self-contained, and go in search of enterprises that are meaningful, fulfilling and personally relevant. They tend to have a ministerial quality that seeks the right kind of career or vocation that will produce the greatest benefit for themselves and others.
- Bucket : This pattern is similar to the bowl except that one of the planets is in the opposite hemisphere to all the others. This lone planet, or Singleton, serves as a handle, thus creating a 'bucket' form. The bucket pattern indicates a desire to become associated with activity in the mainstream of society, so that the person feels they belong. However, what this often means is that the person expects the world to discover their own unique talents, rather than them trying to fit in. They will usually direct their efforts to a single purpose, and strive to achieve objectives rather than act solely for their own self-preservation. The person will probably behave according to the nature of the Singleton planet that forms the handle of the pattern. This planet will exercise a greater influence than normal in the chart, and will be an important part of the dynamic of the person's activities and basic energy.
- Seesaw : In this pattern the planets form two groups on opposite sides of the chart, the groups no less than sixty degrees or two signs apart. As its name suggests, this produces a person who behaves like a 'seesaw', with their life following a pattern of two distinctly contrasting alternatives. The person can find it difficult to integrate these two sharply different parts of their life, which are often in competition with each other. However, success produces the increased sophistication and polished, knowing demeanour of a person who is able to deal with most of life's situations.
- Locomotive : This pattern is produced when all the planets are contained within 240 degrees or nine signs of the zodiac, so that a whole 120 degrees is completely unoccupied. The planet that rises clockwise following the empty space will significantly influence the life of the person with this pattern, no matter what is indicated by the sun sign. It will act as the 'locomotive' of the natal chart, driving the individual to achieve goals through determined and unrelenting effort, with an exceptional drive and fund of energy at their disposal. Such a person will often be a loner, waiting for the public to discover the truth of what they have been saying all along.
- Splay : This type of natal chart is noteworthy because of the presence of at least two, but usually three pairs (or conjunctions) of planets randomly distributed in a 'splay' shape around the chart. A person with this pattern will have enormous talent and potential that needs deliberate attention to be developed into worthwhile skills. The person will be an individualist, with no desire for a regimented or highly organized way of life, and they will seek to avoid becoming trapped in routine. However, there is often the difficulty that there is a lack of relevance between the different skill sets, so that the person may not derive the full benefit from them. Such a person needs to concentrate on 'getting their act together'.
- Splash : As its name suggests this pattern, or rather lack of pattern, occurs when the planets are randomly distributed around the chart in a 'splash'. A person with this pattern will have diversification as their number one asset, with a universal and enriching mental outlook on life. The person will be eager to share their life and resources as universally as possible, wherever the need is greatest. However, as with the splay pattern, there is a danger of the person scattering their energy unproductively.

== Scientific appraisal ==
=== Carlson's experiment ===
Shawn Carlson's double-blind chart matching tests, in which 28 astrologers agreed to match over 100 natal charts to psychological profiles generated by the California Psychological Inventory (CPI) test, is one of the most renowned tests of astrology. The experimental protocol used in Carlson's study was agreed to by a group of physicists and astrologers prior to the experiment. Astrologers, nominated by the National Council for Geocosmic Research, acted as the astrological advisors, and helped to ensure, and agreed, that the test was fair. They also chose 26 of the 28 astrologers for the tests, the other 2 being interested astrologers who volunteered afterwards. The astrologers came from Europe and the United States. The astrologers helped to draw up the central proposition of natal astrology to be tested. Published in Nature in 1985, the study found that predictions based on natal astrology were no better than chance, and that the testing "clearly refutes the astrological hypothesis".

=== Dean and Kelly ===
The scientist and former astrologer Geoffrey Dean and psychologist Ivan Kelly conducted a large scale scientific test, involving more than one hundred cognitive, behavioural, physical, and other variables, but found no support for astrology. Furthermore, a meta-analysis was conducted pooling 40 studies involving 700 astrologers and over 1,000 birth charts. Ten of the tests, which had a total of 300 participating, involved the astrologers picking the correct chart interpretation out of a number of others which were not the astrologically correct chart interpretation (usually 3 to 5 others). When the date and other obvious clues were removed, no significant results were found to suggest there was any preferred chart. A further test involved 45 confident (Note: The level of confidence was self-rated by the astrologers themselves.) astrologers, with an average of 10 years of experience, and 160 test subjects (out of an original sample size of 1198 test subjects) who strongly favoured certain characteristics in the Eysenck Personality Questionnaire to extremes. The astrologers performed much worse than merely basing decisions off the individuals' ages, and much worse than 45 control subjects who did not use birth charts at all. (Note: Also discussed in Martens, Ronny; Trachet, Tim (1998). Making sense of astrology. Amherst, N.Y.: Prometheus Books. ISBN 1-57392-218-8.)

=== Mars effect ===
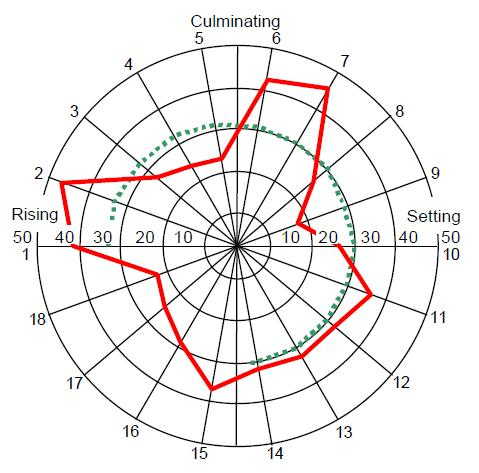
The initial Mars effect finding, showing the relative frequency of the diurnal position of Mars in the birth charts (N = 570) of "eminent athletes" (red solid line) compared to the expected results [after Michel Gauquelin 1955]

In 1955, astrologer and psychologist Michel Gauquelin stated that although he had failed to find evidence to support such indicators as the zodiacal signs and planetary aspects in astrology, he had found positive correlations between the diurnal positions of some of the planets and success in professions (such as doctors, scientists, athletes, actors, writers, painters, etc.) which astrology traditionally associates with those planets. The best-known of Gauquelin's findings is based on the positions of Mars in the natal charts of successful athletes and became known as the "Mars effect". A study conducted by seven French scientists attempted to replicate the claim, but found no statistical evidence. They attributed the effect to selective bias on Gauquelin's part, accusing him of attempting to persuade them to add or delete names from their study.

Geoffrey Dean has suggested that the apparent effect may have been caused by inaccurate self-reporting of birth dates by parents rather than any intentional manipulation of the study results by Gauquelin. The suggestion is that a small subset of the parents may have had changed birth times to be consistent with better astrological charts for a related profession. The sample group was taken from a time when belief in astrology was more common than today. Gauquelin failed to find the Mars effect in more recent populations, in which a nurse or doctor recorded the birth information. The number of births under astrologically undesirable conditions was also lower in the initial study, further indicating that parents had reported dates and times to suit their beliefs.
