= National Council for Geocosmic Research =

Non-profit organization for astrology

The National Council for Geocosmic Research (N.C.G.R) is a non-profit educational organization formed to promote and raise the standards of education and research in astrology. It was founded in Brewster, Massachusetts, United States, on March 6, 1971.

N.C.G.R. has a membership of over 3000 and has established 40 chapters worldwide in 26 countries. It also sponsors several special interest groups, which organize monthly lectures or informal study sessions, usually led by a well-known astrologer. The N.C.G.R. administers its own education and testing program based on four levels of proficiency. The organization provides an ethical code with guidelines for prospective astrologers and publishes the Geocosmic Journal.
