= Tetrabiblos =

Book by Claudius Ptolemaeus

Tetrabiblos (Quadripartitum)
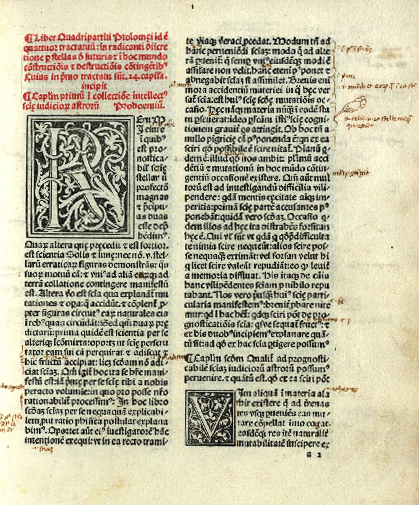
- Opening page of Tetrabiblos: 15th-century Latin printed edition of the 12th-century translation of Plato of Tivoli; published in Venice by Erhard Ratdolt, 1484.
- Author: Claudius Ptolemy
- Original title: Apotelesmatika
- Language: Greek
- Subject: Astrology
- Publication date: 2nd century

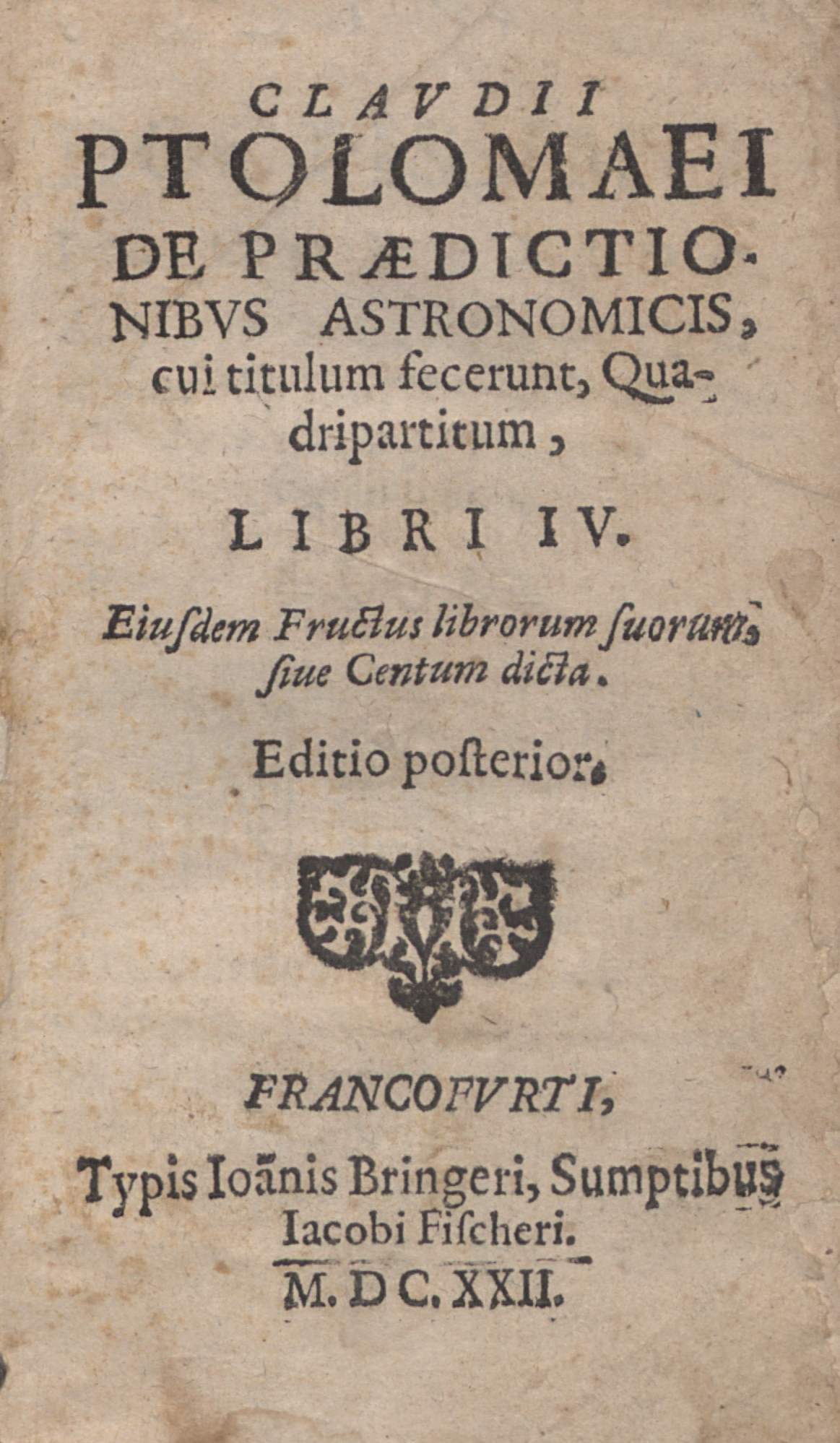
Quadripartitum, 1622

Tetrabiblos (Greek: Τετράβιβλος, lit. 'Four books'), also known as Apotelesmatiká (Greek: Ἀποτελεσματικά, lit. 'On the effects') and in Latin as Quadripartitum (lit. 'Four Parts'), is a text on the philosophy and practice of astrology, written by the Alexandrian scholar Claudius Ptolemy in Koine Greek during the 2nd century CE (c. 90 CE – 168 CE).

Ptolemy's Almagest was an authoritative text on astronomy for more than a thousand years, and the Tetrabiblos, its companion volume, was equally influential in astrology, the study of the effects of astronomical cycles on earthly matters. But whilst the Almagest as an astronomical authority was superseded by acceptance of the heliocentric model of the Solar System, the Tetrabiblos remains an important theoretical work for astrology.

Besides outlining the techniques of astrological practice, Ptolemy's philosophical defense of the subject as a natural, beneficial study helped secure theological tolerance towards astrology in Western Europe during the Medieval era. This allowed Ptolemaic teachings on astrology to be included in universities during the Renaissance, which brought an associated impact upon medical studies and literary works.

The historical importance of the Tetrabiblos is seen by the many ancient, medieval and Renaissance commentaries that have been published about it. It was copied, commented on, paraphrased, abridged, and translated into many languages. The latest critical Greek edition, by Wolfgang Hübner, was published by Teubner in 1998.

== Overview and influence ==
"I know that I am mortal, the creature of one day; but when I explore the winding courses of the stars I no longer touch with my feet the Earth: I am standing near Zeus himself, drinking my fill of Ambrosia, the food of the gods."

— Ptolemy, Anthologia Palatina, 9.577.

Ptolemy is referred to as "the most famous of Greek astrologers" and "a pro-astrological authority of the highest magnitude". As a source of reference his Tetrabiblos is described as having "enjoyed almost the authority of a Bible among the astrological writers of a thousand years or more". Compiled in Alexandria in the 2nd century, the work gathered commentaries about it from its first publication. It was translated into Arabic in the 9th century, and is described as "by far the most influential source of medieval Islamic astrology".

With the translation of the Tetrabiblos into Latin in the 12th century, "Ptolemaic astrology" became integrated by Albertus Magnus and Thomas Aquinas into medieval Christian doctrine. This theological acceptance encouraged the teaching of Ptolemaic astrology in universities, often linked to medical studies. This, in turn, brought attention in literary works, such as Dante's, which helped shape the moral, religious and cosmological paradigm of Western Europe during the Medieval era. The Tetrabiblos was largely responsible for laying down the basic precepts of Renaissance astrology, and was a necessary textbook in some of the finest universities of Renaissance and early modern Europe.

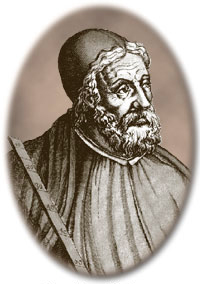
16th-century woodcut depicting Ptolemy, from Les vrais portraits et vies des hommes illustres, Paris, 1584, f°87.

Ptolemaic astrology continued to be taught at European universities into the 17th century, but by the mid-17th century the study struggled to maintain its position as one of the respected Liberal sciences. During this period, the contents of the Tetrabiblos faced severe theological condemnation. Antonio Merenda, a 17th-century professor of civil law at Pavia, dismissed the work as "a diabolical art of divination," writing that "no superstitious art is more fitted to forward the aims of the devil than the astrology of Ptolemy."

The intellectual standing of astrology collapsed rapidly at the end of the 17th century, but the historical impact of the Tetrabiblos upon world culture continues to engage the attention of scholars of classical philosophy and the history of sciences in antiquity. It also maintains its position as an influential textbook for practitioners of modern western astrology, and English translations of the text were published by astrologers in the 18th, 19th and 20th centuries. The early 20th-century Humanist astrologer Dane Rudhyar reported that the astrology of his era "originated almost entirely in the work of the Alexandrian astrologer, Claudius Ptolemy". Even 21st-century astrological textbooks have described the Tetrabiblos as being "without a doubt, indispensable for any serious student of astrology".

The work's enduring significance is attributed to several factors: Ptolemy's reputation as one of the greatest philosophers and scientists of the ancient world, the text's astrological importance as one of the oldest complete manuals on that subject, and the unprecedented order and quality of Ptolemy's astrological explanations.

The "outstanding mark of Ptolemy’s astrology" is described as "informed by the philosophical and scientific spirit of his age". Ptolemy wrote at a time when "physics" was defined by philosophy, and his account of stellar effects was expressed in terms of the four Aristotelian qualities (hot, cold, wet, and dry) set against the philosophical notion of universal unity and cosmic harmony. His objective was to explain the rationale of astrology in such terms, so the work is also notable for its dismissal of astrological practices which lack a direct astronomical basis:

As for the nonsense on which many waste their labour and of which not even a plausible account can be given, this we shall dismiss in favour of the primary natural causes; we shall investigate, not by means of lots and numbers of which no reasonable explanation can be given, but merely through the science of the aspects of the stars to the places with which they have familiarity.

The book opens with an explanation of the philosophical framework of astrology which aims to answer the arguments of critics who questioned the subject's validity. Of this, Lynn Thorndike, in his History of Magic and Experimental Science, writes: "Only the opponents of astrology appear to have remained ignorant of the Tetrabiblos, continuing to make criticisms of the art which do not apply to Ptolemy's presentation of it or which had been specifically answered by him".

Ptolemy was not responsible for originating the astrological techniques he presented in the Tetrabiblos. His contribution was to arrange the material systematically, in order to demonstrate that astrology is based upon logical, hierarchical principles. Astrological influences are frequently referred to the meteorological effects of humoral shifts, which were presumed to result from celestial cycles bringing correlated changes in the heating, cooling, moistening, and drying effects of the atmosphere.

The historical importance and influence of the Tetrabiblos is attested by the many ancient, medieval and Renaissance commentaries published about it, as well as the many translations and paraphrased editions that aim to reproduce its content in an accessible manner. The Greek text has undergone transmission into Arabic, Latin and many modern languages. The first English translation did not appear until the 18th century, but by the end of the 19th century the American astrologer Luke Broughton reported he had at least half a dozen different English translations in his possession.

== Title and date of composition ==
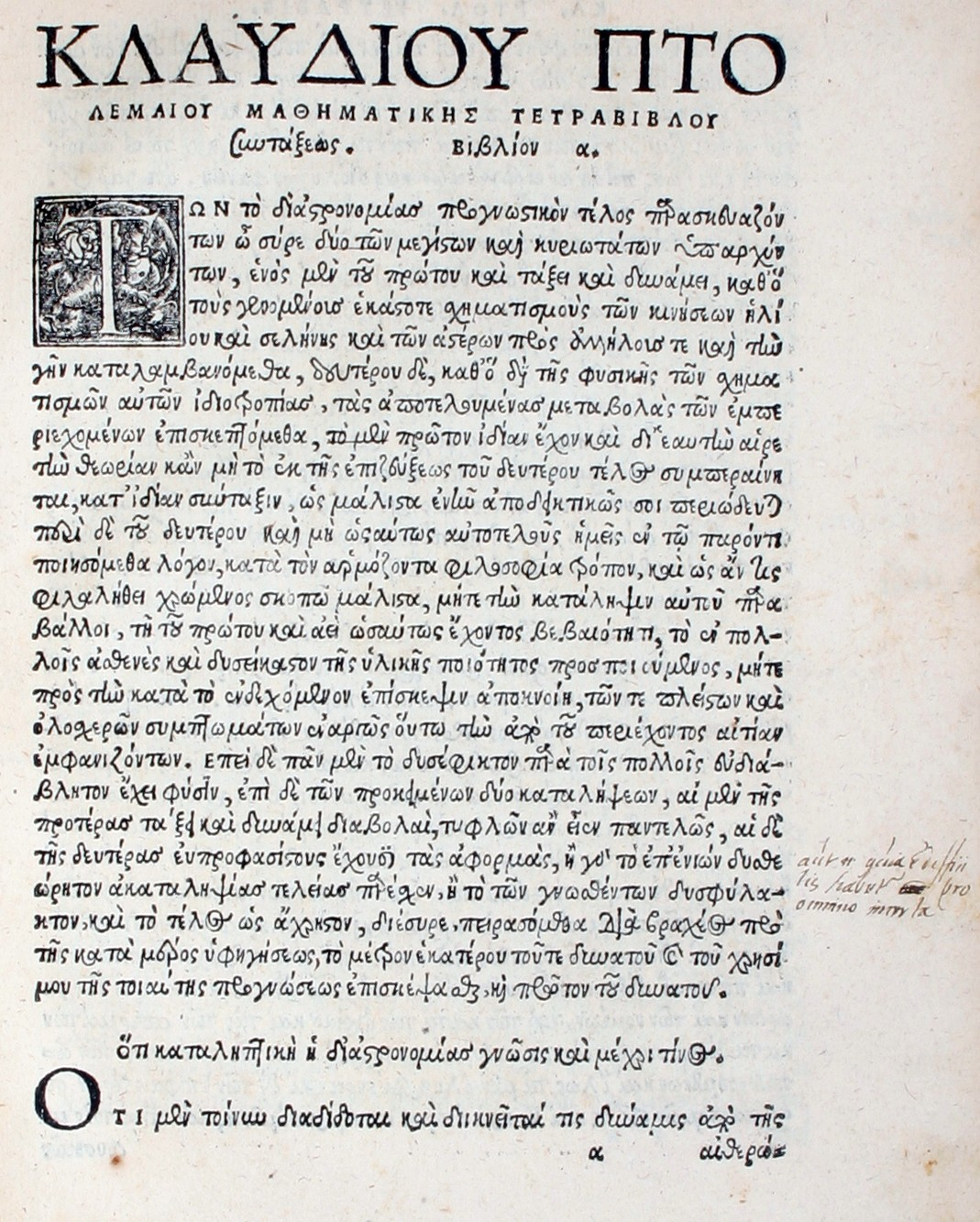
Opening chapter of the first printed edition of Ptolemy's Tetrabiblos, transcribed into Greek and Latin by Joachim Camerarius (Nuremberg, 1535).

The commonly known Greek and Latin titles (Tetrabiblos and Quadripartitum respectively), meaning 'four books', are traditional nicknames for a work which in some Greek manuscripts is entitled Μαθηματικὴ τετράβιβλος σύνταξις, 'Mathematical treatise in four books'. Frank Eggleston Robbins, editor of the Loeb English translation published in 1940, considered it likely that this was the title used by Ptolemy himself, although he acknowledged that many other Greek manuscripts use the title Τὰ πρὸς Σύρον ἀποτελεσματικά, 'The prognostics addressed to Syrus'. An ancient anonymous commentary on the work states that some considered the term Tetrabiblos to be a fictitious name.

Hübner, editor of the 1998 Teubner Greek edition, uses the title Apotelesmatiká (biblía), '(books on) effects', which has been followed by recent scholars. Alexander Jones, editor of the Springer publication Ptolemy in Perspective (2010), considers that Ptolemy's own title remains unknown, but agrees that the term Apotelesmatika is "a credible guess". This term is variously translated to mean 'influences', 'effects' or 'prognostics'; reflecting the theme of work, which is concerned with gaining foreknowledge of the effects of predictable astronomical cycles.

There is no firmly established date for the compilation of the Tetrabiblos, but Ptolemy discloses in his 'Introductory Address' that he wrote his astrological treatise after completing his astronomical one: the Almagest. Evidence within the Almagest reveals that the astronomical work could not have been completed before about 145 AD, which demonstrates that Ptolemy wrote the Tetrabiblos towards the end of his life, sometime between completing the Almagest and his death, generally reported to be around 168 A.D.

== Book I: principles and techniques ==
=== Opening chapters ===
"Most events of a general nature draw their causes from the enveloping heavens."

— Ptolemy, Tetrabiblos I.1.

The text begins with Ptolemy's address to "Syrus", an unidentified character to whom all Ptolemy's works are dedicated. In this Ptolemy differentiates between two types of astronomical study: the first (astronomy proper) which discovers the astronomical cycles and movements; the second (astrology) which investigates the changes these movements bring about. He states that each has its own science and the former is desirable in its own right "even though it does not attain the result given by its combination with the second". This is taken to demonstrate Ptolemy's view that astronomy and astrology are complementary studies, so that whilst astrology is less self-sufficient and factual, its employment makes the practice of astronomy more useful. Although the terms astronomia and astrologia were used interchangeably in ancient texts, this also demonstrates the early definition of two differentiated subjects which were discussed at length by Ptolemy in two separate works.

Ptolemy states that having dealt with the former subject (astronomy) in its own treatise, he "shall now give an account of the second and less self-sufficient method in a properly philosophical way, so that one whose aim is the truth might never compare its perceptions with the sureness of the first". In this, and further introductory remarks, he reveals his view that astrological prediction is extremely difficult and easily subject to error, but satisfactorily attainable to those who possess the necessary skill and experience, and of too much benefit to be dismissed simply because it can sometimes be mistaken.

==== Ptolemy's philosophical arguments ====
Chapters 2 and 3 are important for giving Ptolemy's philosophical defense of his subject. Franz Boll noticed the arguments were paralleled in older sources, particularly those of the Stoic philosopher Posidonius (c.135 BCE–c.AD 51 BCE). Equally, Ptolemy's narrative was drawn upon by later philosophers and astronomers, such as Johannes Kepler, who used similar examples and the same order of arguments to explain the physical foundation of some astrological claims. Described as "scientifically speaking, perfectly laudable" by one modern commentator, another has condemned these chapters as the place where Ptolemy's "knowledge, intelligence and rhetorical skill" are most "misused".

In chapter one Ptolemy asserts the legitimacy of the study and identifies the two main arguments set against it:

1. the complexity of the subject makes its claim of providing reliable foreknowledge unattainable;
2. reliable foreknowledge—if it can be attained—would imply such fatalism as to make the subject's purpose useless (since if the future is predictable, anything which is destined to happen will happen whether predicted or not).

Ptolemy then answers each criticism in the following two chapters.

Argument on the extent of astrology's reliability

In chapter two Ptolemy maintains that knowledge gained by astronomical means is attainable and he attempts to define its limits according to "Aristotelian-Stoic" logic. He points out how the Sun has the greatest influence upon the Earth's seasonal and daily cycles, and that most things in nature are synchronised by the Moon:

... as the heavenly body nearest the Earth, the Moon bestows her effluence most abundantly upon mundane things, for most of them, animate or inanimate, are sympathetic to her and change in company with her; the rivers increase and diminish their streams with her light, the seas turn their own tides with her rising and setting, and plants and animals in whole or in some part wax and wane with her.

He extends this ability to stir the weather and steer the biological patterns of earthly creatures to the fixed stars and planets, so that everything which experiences cycles of growth, or patterns of behaviour, is in some way responsive to the celestial cycles. These bring about elemental changes (hot, windy, snowy or watery conditions, etc): led by the Sun, activated by the Moon and aided by the planetary configurations and the fixed stars' phenomena. The prevailing meteorological qualities are then considered to determine the temperament – the quality of the moment of time at a specific place – which is presumed to be impressed, as a sort of temporal imprint, upon the seed of anything which comes into germination or manifestation at that moment in time. Ptolemy admits that successful analysis of this temperament is not easily attained but is capable of being determined by someone who is able to regard the data "both scientifically and by successful conjecture". He questions why, if a person can reliably predict the general weather patterns and their effects upon agricultural seeds and animals from the knowledge of the celestial cycles:

... can he not, too, with respect to an individual man, perceive the general quality of his temperament from the ambient at the time of his birth, … and predict occasional events, by the fact that such and such an ambient is attuned to such and such a temperament and is favourable to prosperity, while another is not so attuned and conduces to injury?

Whilst suggesting that such arguments are enough to demonstrate the validity of astrology, Ptolemy accepts that many mistakes are made in its practice – partly because of "evident rascals" who profess to practice it without due knowledge and pretend to foretell things which cannot be naturally known (sometimes using the term 'astrology' for practices which are not true to the genuine study of astrology) and because legitimate practitioners must acquire a magnitude of knowledge and experience within a limited life-span. His summary is that the study is usually only able to give reliable knowledge in general terms; that astrological advice should be welcomed but not expected to be faultless; and that the astrologer should not be criticised but encouraged to integrate non-celestial information within the compilation of a judgement (such as what is known of an individual's ethnic background, nationality and parental influences).

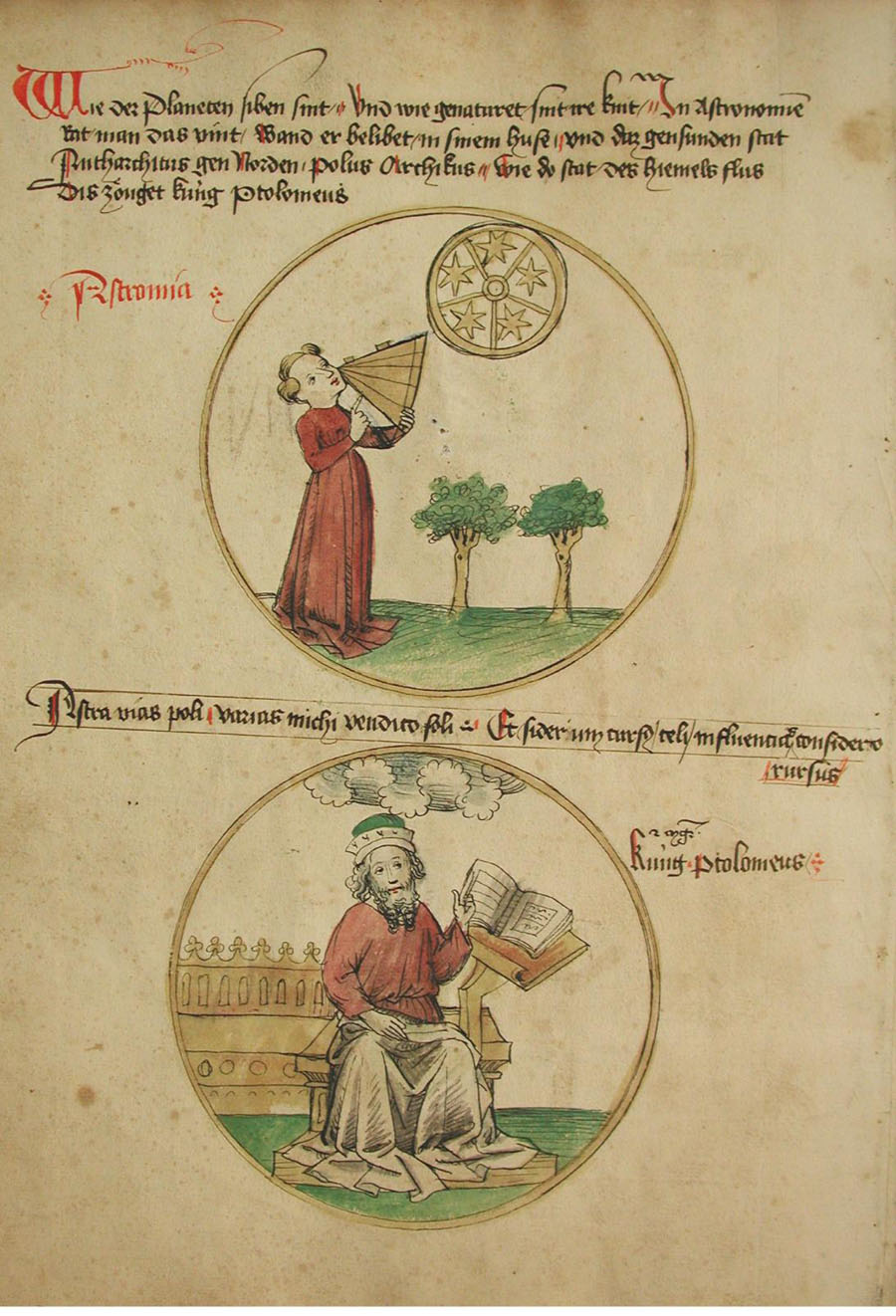
15th-century manuscript illustration of astronomy as one of the seven liberal arts, showing Ptolemy as its patron.

==== Argument on whether astrology is natural and useful ====
In chapter three Ptolemy argues that astrological prediction is both natural and beneficial. The translation of these ideas into Latin in the 12th century are described as being "of critical importance" to the adoption of a favourable attitude towards astrology within Christianity than it was in the European Dark Ages in the Medieval period.

Ptolemy first proposes that it is not "useless" to create predictions of what is likely to happen, even if the predictions do not provide the means to avoid impending disaster. This was one of the well known classical criticisms that had been brought to prominence in Cicero's text De Divinatione, in the argument that no good comes from warnings of imminent disasters when they offer no means of escape. Ptolemy gives a more positive view of divination in his assessment of astrology as a subject "by which we gain full view of things human and divine", which, he argues, gives a better perception of "what is fitting and expedient for the capabilities of each temperament". He views astrology as a subject which encourages enhanced self-knowledge, to be valued as a source of pleasure and well-being; since even if astrology cannot aid in the acquisition of riches or fame; the same can be said of all philosophy, which concerns itself with "greater advantages". Hence, in the case of unfortunate events that will necessarily take place, Ptolemy asserts that astrological prediction still brings benefits, because "foreknowledge accustoms and calms the soul by experience of distant events as though they were present, and prepares it to greet with calm and steadiness whatever comes".

Ptolemy's next argument was to avoid the criticisms that arise when the practice of prediction is seen to suggest fatal necessity. This point was crucial to later theological acceptance, since Medieval religious doctrine dictates that the individual soul must possess free will, in order to be responsible for its own choices and the consequences that flow from them. Gerard of Feltre's 13th-century text Summa on the Stars demonstrates the problem that astrological determinism creates for the theological argument: "If the stars make a man a murderer or a thief, then all the more it is the first cause, God, who does this, which it is shameful to suggest". Ptolemy's comments counter the criticism by proposing that whilst the celestial cycles are entirely reliable and "eternally performed in accordance with divine, unchangeable destiny", all earthly things are also subject to "a natural and mutable fate, and in drawing its first causes from above it is governed by chance and natural sequence". He therefore declares that nothing is irrevocably ordained, and we are not to imagine that "events attend mankind as the result of the heavenly cause as if … destined to take place by necessity without the possibility of any other cause whatever interfering".

In this discussion Ptolemy makes a point that was to be called upon by many later astrological writers, that "the lesser cause always yields to the stronger". He sees an individual as unable to resist the greater cycles of change which happen to the wider community, so even a man whose horoscope indicates gain may perish at a time that his community is struck by natural disaster or pestilence. However, Ptolemy also maintains that disastrous events will only follow a natural course if no counter action is taken to avert the problem, as when "future happenings to men are not known, or if they are known and the remedies are not applied". He takes a balanced position in the argument of fate versus free will in writing that certain things, because their effective causes are numerous, become inevitable, whilst others are able to be averted by the act of astrological prediction. The astrologer's position is compared to that of the physician, who must be able to recognise beforehand which ailments are always fatal, and which admit of aid.

"...it is the same with philosophy – we need not abandon it because there are evident rascals amongst those that pretend to it."

— Ptolemy, Tetrabiblos I.2.

It is therefore reasonable, in Ptolemy's estimation, to moderate actions with awareness of how the prevailing and future temperament prospers or injures the natal temperament, or to elect to act at a time that is astrologically suitable to the activity – just as it is deemed rational to use knowledge of the stars to ensure safety at sea; to use knowledge of the lunar cycle to ensure successful breeding and sowing, or to cool ourselves against the extremes of temperature in order that we suffer less.

Ptolemy's philosophical conclusion on the subject, which helped to secure its intellectual standing until the 18th century, is thus: "even if it be not entirely infallible, at least its possibilities have appeared worthy of the highest regard". Having justified his intellectual involvement in the study, according to the philosophical principles of his day, Ptolemy then turns his attention to the practical theory of astrology, and the rationale that lies behind the arrangement of its principles.

=== Introduction of principles ===
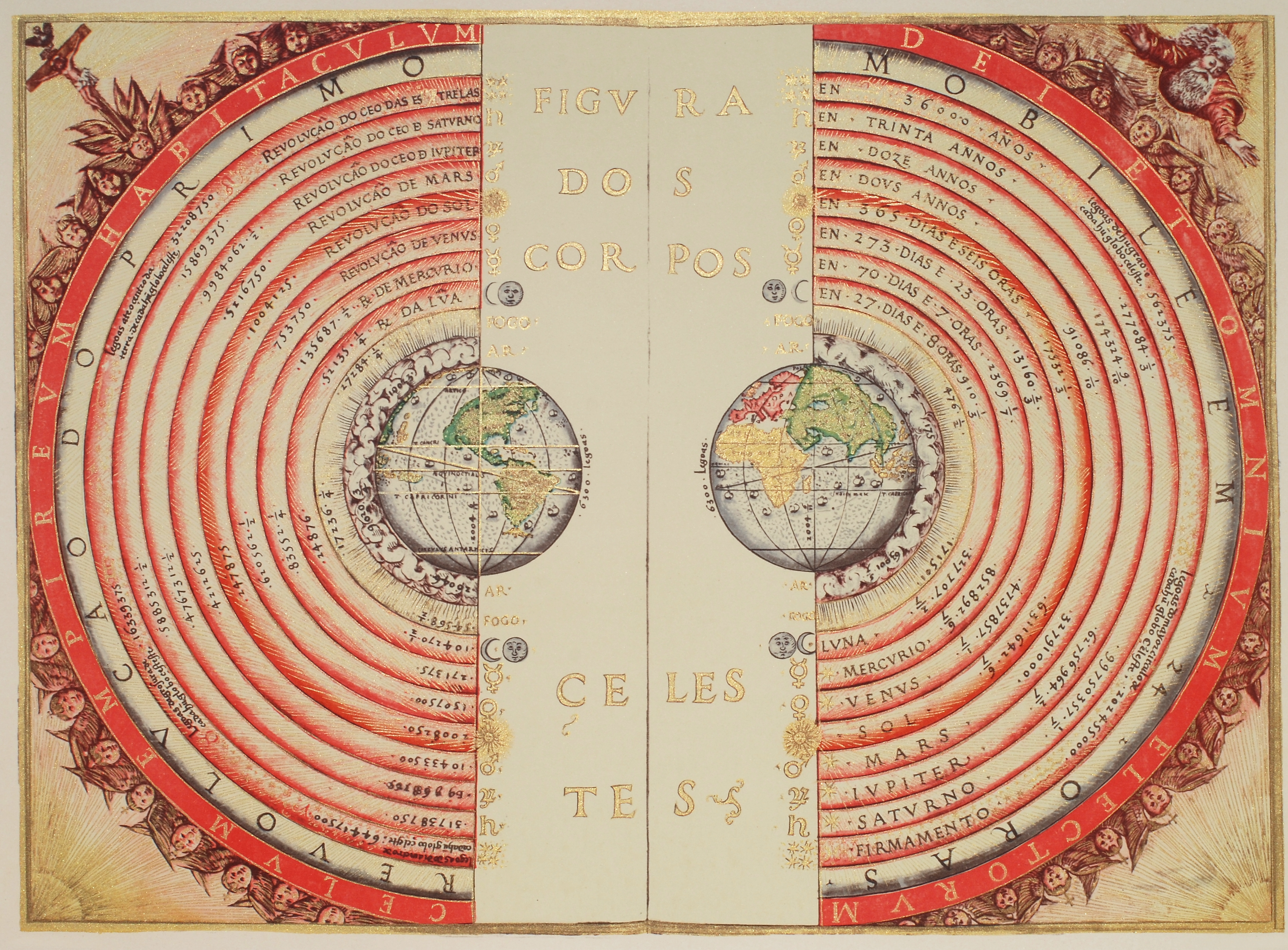
Figure of the heavenly bodies — An illustration of the Ptolemaic geocentric system by Portuguese cosmographer and cartographer Bartolomeu Velho, 1568 (Bibliothèque Nationale, Paris).

One of the unique features of the Tetrabiblos, amongst the astrological texts of its period, is the extent to which the first book not only introduces the basic astrological principles, but synthesises and explains the reasoning behind their reported associations in line with Aristotelian philosophy. Chapter four, for example, explains the "power of the planets" through their associations with the creative humoral qualities of warmth or moisture, or the reductive qualities of cold and dryness. Hence Mars is described as a destructive planet because its humoral association is excessive dryness, whilst Jupiter is defined as temperate and fertilising because its association is moderate warmth and humidity. These associations are based on the arrangements of the planets with regard to the Sun, as perceived from the geocentric perspective, by which their orbits are measured is if they are centred upon the Earth.

Uniting these Aristotelian principles with a prevalent Greek philosophy employed by Zeno of Citium and the Pythagoreans, the next three chapters arrange the planets into pairs of opposites. They may be benefic (moderately warming or moistening) or malefic (excessively cooling or drying); masculine (drying) or feminine (moistening); active and diurnal (suited to the qualities of the day and aligned with the nature of the Sun) or passive and nocturnal (suited to the qualities of the night and aligned with the nature of the Moon). Since these humoral associations derive from configurations with the Sun, chapter eight describes how they are subtly modified according to the phase of each planet's synodic cycle with the Sun.

Chapter nine discusses the "power of the fixed stars". Here, rather than give direct humoral associations, Ptolemy describes their "temperatures" as being like that of the planets he has already defined. Hence Aldebaran ("called the Torch") is described as having "a temperature like that of Mars", whilst other stars in the Hyades are "like that of Saturn and moderately like that of Mercury". At the end of the chapter Ptolemy clarifies that these are not his proposals, but are drawn from historical sources, being "the observations of the effects of the stars themselves as made by our predecessors".

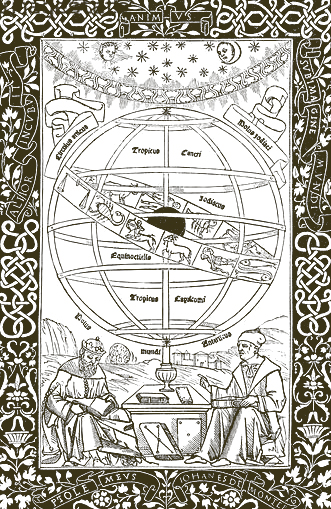
Ptolemy instructing Regiomontanus under an image of the zodiac encircling the celestial spheres. Frontispiece from Ptolemy's Almagest, (Venice, 1496).

Chapter ten returns to the humoral theme more explicitly, clarifying that the zodiac is aligned to the seasons and so expressive of the shifting emphasis through moisture, warmth, dryness and cold, (as brought about by spring, summer, autumn, and winter). Similarly, the four angles of the chart present an humoral emphasis through association with the effects of the four cardinal winds that blow from their aligned directions. The remainder of book one (up to the final two chapters which concern the planetary phases and aspectual applications), presents the rulerships, divisions, and configurations of the zodiac signs, most of which are related to astronomical definitions, seasonal effects, physics and geometry. Geometrical principles are used to define the favourable or unfavourable quality of astrological aspects, based on the angular relationship of planets and signs with ecliptic degrees.

In Ptolemy's era the boundaries of the zodiac signs were close to those of the visible constellations whose names they bear, but Ptolemy demonstrates the theoretical distinction between the two frames of reference in describing the starting point of the zodiac as fixed, not to the stars, but to the mathematically calculated vernal equinox. This determines the seasonally based tropical zodiac which takes its name from the Greek word τροπικός tropikos: ‘of the turning’, because it is set by the turn of the seasons and, being subject to precession, experiences a slow and gradual revolution through the visible constellations. For the same reason, the signs that mark the Sun's summer and winter solstice points (Cancer and Capricorn) are described as the 'tropical signs', since these are the places where the Sun 'turns' its direction in celestial latitude, (thereby defining the terrestrial circles of latitude known as the Tropic of Cancer and the Tropic of Capricorn).

Whereas other ancient astrological writers gave their emphasis to the astrological interpretation of such definitions (for example, in describing how tropical signs are indicative of quickly changing situations), Ptolemy's focus is notably different; given to the astronomical and philosophical factors that underlie the definitions rather than their astrological meaning in practice. Ptolemy explains that the definitions of the zodiac are not his own, but present "the natural characters of the zodiacal signs, as they have been handed down by tradition". His approach finds elegant expression where he is demonstrating the logic of schematic arrangements (such as the philosophical principles behind the planetary rulership of signs), but is noted to convey detachment in regard to the elements of astrology that are not so obviously plausible. This can be seen in the way that Ptolemy avoids going into detail on the facets of astrology that rely on mythological, or symbolic associations, and how he is willing to outline the reasoning behind conflicting astrological proposals without revealing any personal preference for one scheme over another.

Some commentators have viewed Ptolemy's comparatively dispassionate approach towards points of astrological contention as reason to suppose he was more interested in the theoretical principles than the actual practice of astrology. On the other hand, the objective tone that marks his style; his assertion that the subject is natural (by which he makes no demand for oaths of secrecy from its students as some contemporaries do); and the way he shows respectful reference to alternative views without vilifying authors whose practices might differ from his own, all helped to secure the text's historical reputation as an intellectually superior one. Classics scholar Mark Riley raised these points in his assessment that Ptolemy approached the subject of astrology with exactly the same theoretical inclination that he applied to astronomy, geography and the other sciences on which he wrote. This distinctive style of approach led Riley to conclude: "The respect shown to Ptolemy’s work by all later astrologers was due, not to its usefulness to the practitioner, but to his magisterial synthesis of astrology and science".

== Book II: Mundane astrology ==
Book II presents Ptolemy's treatise on mundane astrology. This offers a comprehensive review of ethnic stereotypes, eclipses, significations of comets and seasonal lunations, as used in the prediction of national economics, wars, epidemics, natural disasters and weather patterns. No other surviving ancient text offers a comparable account of this topic, in terms of the breadth and depth of detail offered by Ptolemy. Although no demonstrated examples are given, he writes with authority in this branch of his subject, which suggests it was of particular interest to him. Modern commentators have remarked that Ptolemy was "consciously taking a different approach" to contrast "with the 'old', infinitely complicated methods".

Ptolemy begins by stating he has briefly reviewed the important principles and will now develop the details of astrology in the appropriate order. His point is that astrological assessment of any 'particular' individual must rest upon prior knowledge of the 'general' temperament of their ethnic type; and that the circumstances of individual lives are subsumed, to some extent, within the fate of their community.

The second chapter gives a broad generalisation of how differences in physical traits occur between the inhabitants of the various climes (a demarcation based on latitude). Communities that live close to the equator, for example, are described as having black skins, small statures, and thick woolly hair, as a protective response to the burning heat of that location. By contrast, communities that have settled in high northern regions are defined by their colder environment and its greater share of moisture. Their bodily forms are paler, taller, with finer hair, and in their characteristics they are described as "somewhat cold in nature". Both types are described as lacking civilisation because of the extremes of their environment, whereas communities that live in temperate regions are medium in colouring, moderate in stature and enjoy a more equable lifestyle. The several regions are similarly defined according to the mix that arises within this kind of analysis. Ptolemy explains that such considerations are only dealt with summarily, as a background consideration for what follows. He also makes clear that such traits are to be found "generally present, but not in every individual".

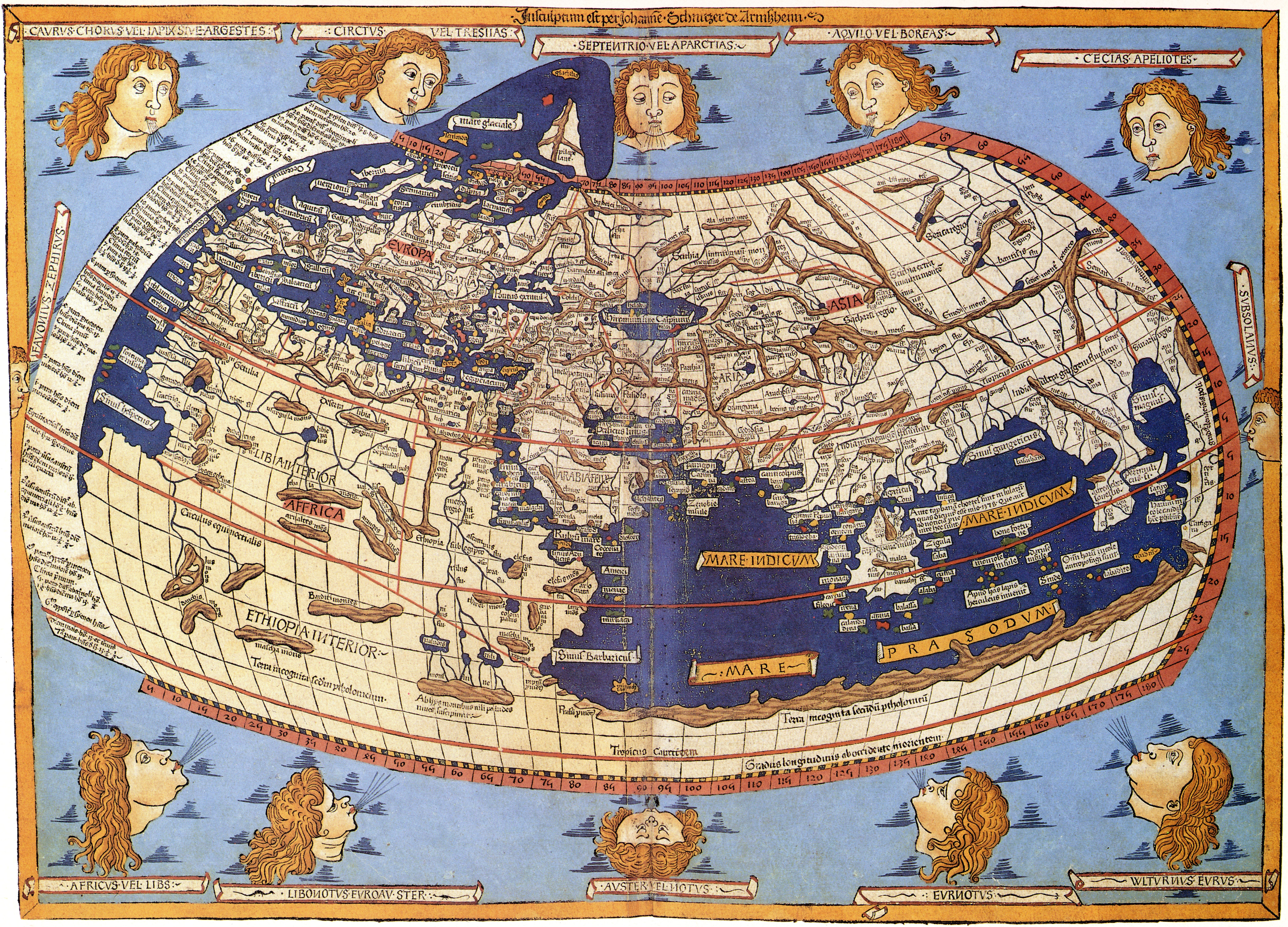
15th-century map depicting Ptolemy's description of the inhabited world, (1482, Johannes Schnitzer).

In chapter 3 Ptolemy unites his interests in astrology and geography, to outline the astrological associations of "our inhabited world". Maps based on Ptolemy's Geographica show Ptolemy's definition of the inhabited world as (roughly) extending from the equator to latitude 66°N, covering the land mass between the Atlantic Ocean and East China Sea. Ptolemy extends the logic given in ancient Babylonian texts where the four quarters of the known world are attributed to the four triplicity arrangements of the zodiac. The attribution is based on association between the planets that govern the triplicities and the directions and winds those planets are affiliated with. For example, the 'Aries triplicity' (which includes Aries, Leo and Sagittarius) is chiefly dominated by Jupiter and assisted by Mars. Jupiter rules the north wind and Mars the west wind; therefore this triplicity governs the north-west quarter of Ptolemy's "inhabited world": the area known as Europe.

Again, these divisions are general, and specific rulership of each nation is modified by location and observed cultural distinctions. For example, in Europe, only those regions that lie to the north-west extremes are fully attributed to Jupiter and Mars, since those that lie towards the centre of the inhabited area incline towards the influence of opposing regions. In this way, the "inhabited region" experiences a drift of astrological correspondence rather than sharp divisions within its quarters, and independent nations are variously affiliated with the signs of each triplicity and the planets that rule them. Ptolemy names Britain and Spain as two nations appropriately placed in the north-west quarter to accept the rulership of Jupiter and Mars. Such nations are described as "independent, liberty-loving, fond of arms, industrious", based on characteristics attributed to those planets. Being predominantly governed by masculine planets they are also "without passion for women and look down upon the pleasures of love". Observed characteristics influence his categorisation of Britain as having a closer affinity with Aries and Mars (by which "for the most part its inhabitants are fiercer, more headstrong and bestial"), whilst Spain is reported to be more subject to Sagittarius and Jupiter, (from which is evidenced "their independence, simplicity and love of cleanliness").

Though Ptolemy describes his analysis as a "brief exposition", the chapter builds into an extensive association between planets, zodiac signs and the national characteristics of 73 nations. It concludes with three additional assertions which act as core principles of mundane astrology:

1. Each of the fixed stars has familiarity with the countries attributed to the sign of its ecliptic rising.
2. The time of the first founding of a city (or nation) can be used in a similar way to an individual horoscope, to astrologically establish the characteristics and experiences of that city. The most significant considerations are the regions of the zodiac which mark the place of the Sun and Moon, and the four angles of the chart – in particular the ascendant.
3. If the time of the foundation of the city or nation is not known, a similar use can be made of the horoscope of whoever holds office or is king at the time, with particular attention given to the midheaven of that chart.

=== Use of eclipses ===
The remainder of the book shows how this information is used in the prediction of mundane events. Focus is given to eclipses, as the "first and most potent" cause of change, supplemented by examination of the 'stations' of the superior planets: Saturn, Jupiter and Mars. Although eclipses are deemed relevant to any nation affiliated with the zodiac signs in which they occur, Ptolemy's scrutiny is reserved for regions where they are visible, which he argues will manifest the effects most noticeably. The period of obscuration determines the endurance of the effect, with each hour proportioning to years for a solar eclipse and months for a lunar eclipse. The location of the eclipse with relation to the horizon is then used to judge whether the effects are most prevalent at the beginning, middle or end of the period, with times of intensification identified by planetary contacts to the degree of the eclipse which occur within this period.

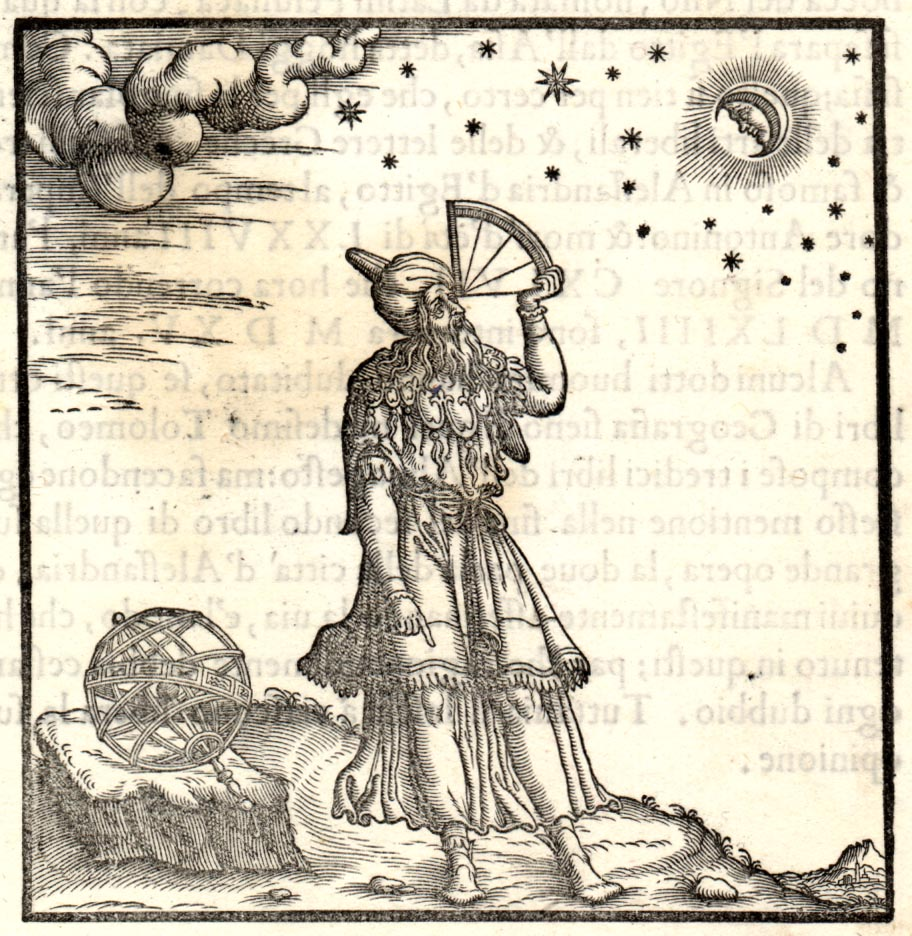
Depiction of Ptolemy employing a quadrant, from Giordano Ziletti's Principles of astrology and geography according to Ptolemy, 1564.

Chapter 7 begins the examination of what type of event will manifest. This is judged by the angle of the horizon which precedes the eclipse in the chart set for the location under scrutiny and the planet(s) that dominate this angle by rulership and powerful aspectual connections. Whether the predicted effect is beneficial or destructive depends on the condition of these planets, whilst the type of manifestation is judged by the zodiac signs, fixed stars and constellations involved. The resulting prediction is of relevance to nations, but Ptolemy points out that certain individuals are more resonant to the effects than others; namely those have the Sun or Moon in their horoscopes in the same degree as the eclipse, or the degree that directly opposes it.

Within his Almagest Ptolemy explains that he had access to eclipse records kept for 900 years since the beginning of the reign of king Nabonassar (747 BC). In chapter 9 of the Tetrabiblos he shows knowledge of the Babylonian lore that accompanied these records in detailing the omens based on visual phenomena. The colours of eclipses and "the formations that occur near them, such as rods, halos, and the like" are considered along with the astrological significance of comets, in whether they take the form of "'beams', 'trumpets', 'jars', and the like". Meaning is derived from their position relative to the Sun and assessment of "the parts of the zodiac in which their heads appear and through the directions in which the shapes of their tails point". It is noted that here Ptolemy uses principles that fall outside the neat theoretical logic he presents in book I, being explicable only in terms of the mythological and omen tradition inherited from his ancient sources. He also defends the subjective nature of the analysis involved, asserting that it would be impossible to mention the proper outcome of all this investigation, which calls for enterprise and ingenuity from the astrologer creating the judgement.

The remaining chapters of book II are dedicated to meteorological matters. Chapter 10 specifies that the new or full Moon preceding the Sun's ingress into Aries can be used as a starting point for investigations concerning the weather patterns of the year. Lunations which precede the Sun's ingress into any the other equinoctial and solstice signs (Cancer, Libra and Capricorn) can also be used for seasonal concerns, and within these "monthly investigations" bring more particular details based on lunations and the conjunctions of the planets. The recorded weather effects of the fixed stars in the zodiac constellations are systematically discussed, concluding with the relevance of generally observed sky phenomena such as shooting stars, cloud formations and rainbows. These final considerations are expected to add localised details to the original exploration of eclipse cycles. Ptolemy's theme throughout the book is that charts of this nature cannot be judged in isolation, but are to be understood within the pattern of cycles to which they belong, and where there are strong connections between the degree points involved; for:

In every case… one should draw his conclusions on the principle that the universal and primary underlying cause takes precedence and that the cause of particular events is secondary to it, and that the force is most ensured and strengthened when the stars which are the lords of the universal natures are configurated with the particular causes.

With the astrologer expected to have knowledge and awareness of the mundane cycles that outline the background principles of the personal horoscope, Ptolemy closes this book with the promise that the next will supply "with due order" the procedure which allows predictions based on the horoscopes of individuals.

== Book III: Individual horoscopes (genetic influences and predispositions) ==
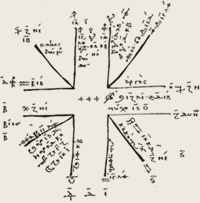
Byzantine reproduction of a Greek horoscope attributed to the philosopher Eutocius, 497 A.D.

Books III and IV explore what Ptolemy terms "the genethlialogical art": the interpretation of a horoscope set for the moment of the birth of an individual. He explains that there are several cycles of life to consider but the starting point for all investigation is the time of conception or birth. The former "the genesis of the seed"” allows knowledge of events that precede the birth; the latter "the genesis of the man" is "more perfect in potentiality" because when the child leaves the womb and comes "forth into the light under the appropriate conformation of the heavens" the temperament, disposition and physical form of the body is set. The two moments are described as being linked by a "very similar causative power", so that the seed of the conception takes independent form at an astrologically suitable moment, whereby the impulse to give birth occurs under a "configuration of similar type to that which governed the child's formation in detail in the first place". Chapter 2 continues this theme in discussing the importance of calculating the precise degree of the ascendant at birth, the difficulty of recording local time precisely enough to establish this, and the methods available for rectification (i.e., ensuring the chart is correct).

Chapter 3 describes how the analysis of the chart is divided into predictions of:

1. essential, genetic qualities established prior to birth (such family and parental influences),
2. those that become known at the birth (such as the sex of the child and birth defects), and
3. those that can only be known post-natally (such as length of life, the quality of the mind, illnesses, marriage, children, and material fortunes).

Ptolemy explains the order by which each theme becomes relevant, and follows this in his arrangement of topics presented in the remaining chapters of books III and IV.

First he deals with the prenatal matters, covering the astrological significators of the parents in chapter 4, and siblings in chapter 5. Then he deals with the matters "directly concerned with the birth", explaining how to judge such issues as whether the child will be male or female (ch.6); whether the birth will produce twins or multiple children (ch.7); and whether it will involve physical defects or monstrous forms; if so, whether these are accompanied by mental deficiency, notability or honour (ch.8).

"The consideration of the length of life takes the leading place among inquiries about events following birth, for, as the ancient says, it is ridiculous to attach particular predictions to one who, by the constitution of the years of his life, will never attain at all to the time of the predicted events. This doctrine is no simple matter, nor unrelated to others, but in complex fashion derived from the domination of the places of greatest authority."

— Ptolemy, Tetrabiblos III.10.

The exploration of post-natal concerns begins in chapter 9 with a review of astrological factors that occur when children are not reared. This considers the indications of still births and babies that seem "half-dead", or those that have been left exposed (including whether there is possibility they may be taken up and live). Chapter 10 then details the techniques for establishing the length of life under normal circumstances. This is an important and lengthy passage of text, the techniques of which require precise astronomical detail and advanced knowledge of complex progressive techniques. Jim Tester has commented on how Ptolemy goes into an unusual level of detail in a responsibility that Bouché-Leclercq described as "the chief task of astrology, the operation judged most difficult by practitioners, most dangerous and damnable by its enemies". Such a prediction involves judicial skill as well as mathematical expertise since several 'destructive' periods may be identified but countered by other, protective astrological influences, resulting in periods of danger or illness that does not lead to death. This is followed, in chapter 11, by the astrological principles from which judgement is made of bodily appearance and temperament. The planetary significations follow the logic of their humoral associations, so that Jupiter (associated with warmth and moisture, an humoral combination which promotes growth) gives largeness in bodily form. Since these define, to some extent, predisposition towards bodily afflictions, there is a natural flow towards the content of chapter 12, which focuses on the astrological significators relating to injuries and diseases. The details of planetary associations with bodily organs and functions are given, such as Saturn ruling the spleen and Jupiter the lungs. Jim Tester has pointed out that several lists of this type exist "more or less agreeing in detail".

The third book concludes with a discussion in chapters 13 and 14 of what is described as a "largely overlooked" facet of Ptolemaic doctrine: the "psychological" one, which concerns the quality of the soul (or psyche). Historian Nicholas Campion has discussed the roots of the notion that celestial and psychological realms are connected, which can be traced to the 6th century BC, and in Ptolemy's case presents a mixture of Aristotelian and Stoic philosophy, resting on the Platonic view that "the soul comes from the heavens" which explains "how human character comes to be determined by the heavens".

The soul, for Ptolemy, includes the faculty for conscious reasoning, which is rational and attributed to the condition of Mercury, and the subconscious and unconscious elements of the mind (the "sensory and irrational part"), which is sensitive and attributed to the condition of the Moon. These two chapters make analysis of instinctual impulses and moral inclinations, being concerned with psychological motives and behavioural expression rather than the physical temperament described in chapter 11. Diseases of the soul are defined as "affections which are utterly disproportionate and as it were pathological" including insanity, inability to exercise moderation or restraint, instability of the emotions, depraved sexuality, morbid perversions, and violent afflictions of the intellectual and passive parts of the mind. The astrological explanations are mainly related to the exaggerated influence of destructive planets which are also in difficult configurations with Mercury and the Sun or Moon, or the planet associated with the psychological impulse (for example, Venus in matters of sexuality). Campion has pointed out that these planetary associations with psychological qualities are not original to Ptolemy, being present in the Corpus Hermeticum which was in circulation in Alexandria at the time Ptolemy compiled his text.

Within this book Ptolemy has surveyed all the topics that relate to inner qualities, genetic patterns, predispositions and the natural tendencies present from birth. His exploration of individual horoscopes continues into book IV, the only distinction of content being that subsequent topics relate to material matters and life experiences: what Ptolemy refers to as "external accidentals".

== Book IV: Individual horoscopes (external accidentals) ==
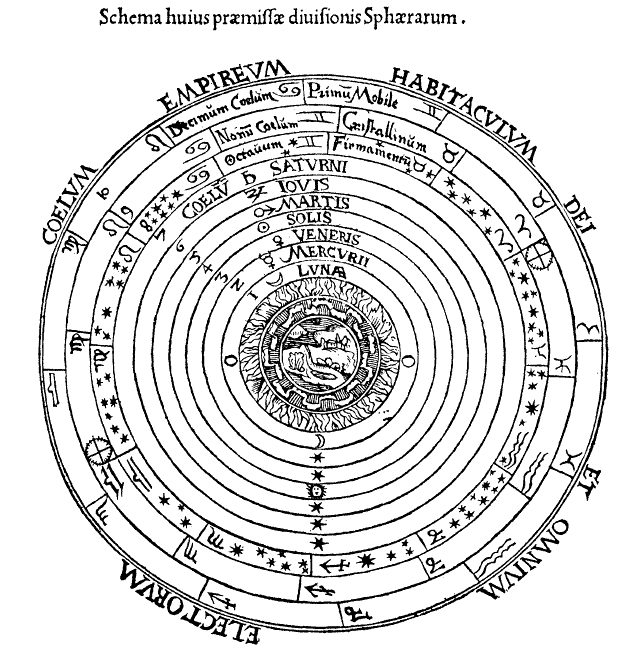
Ptolemy's geocentric celestial spheres; Peter Apian's Cosmographia (1539)

Book IV is presented with a brief introduction to reaffirm the arrangement of content as previously described. It starts with the topics of riches and honour. Ptolemy says: "as material fortune is associated with the properties of the body, so honour belongs to those of the soul". Chapter 2, on material wealth, employs the "so-called 'Lot of Fortune'" although Ptolemy's instruction conflicts with that of many of his contemporaries in stating that for its calculation "we measure from the horoscope the distance from the sun to the moon, in both diurnal and nocturnal nativities". Ptolemy's reputation ensured this approach to calculation was adopted by many later medieval and Renaissance astrologers, although it is now realised that most Hellenistic astrologers reversed the formula of calculation for nocturnal births. It is notable that in his discussion "Of the fortune of Dignity", in chapter three, Ptolemy makes no reference to the Lot of Spirit (or Daimon), which would normally be used as the spiritual counterpart to the material wealth and happiness associated with the Lot of Fortune. This is viewed as a demonstration of his general dislike (declared in bk. III.3) for "lots and numbers of which no reasonable explanation can be given".

The subsequent chapter, the title of which is translated by Robbins as 'Of the Quality of Action', concerns professional inclinations and the significators of career advance (or decline). This is followed by the treatment of marriage in chapter 5, which is primarily referred to the Moon in a man's chart, to describe his wife, and the Sun in a woman's chart to describe her husband. Here Ptolemy shows employment of the astrological technique known as synastry, in which the planetary positions of two separate horoscopes are compared with each other for indications of relationship harmony or enmity.

"Marriages for the most part are lasting when in both the genitures the luminaries happen to be in harmonious aspect, that is, in trine or in sextile with one another … Divorces on slight pretexts and complete alienations occur when the aforesaid positions of the luminaries are in disjunct signs, or in opposition or in quartile."

— Ptolemy, Tetrabiblos IV.5.

The next four chapters complete the survey of natal themes, dealing with the topics of children (ch.6); friends and enemies (ch.7); the dangers of foreign travel (ch.8) and the quality (or type) of death (ch.9 – as opposed to the time of death considered in III.10).

The final chapter of the work is described as "a curious one" for introducing a separate theme at the end of the book. This refers to the seven 'ages of man', which Ptolemy briefly mentioned in III.1 as a matter which varies the emphasis of astrological configurations according to the time in life they occur: "we predict events that will come about at specific times and vary in degree, following the so called ages of life. His argument is that, just as an astrologer must consider cultural differences "lest he mistake the appropriate customs and manners by assigning, for example, marriage with a sister to one who is Italian by race, instead of to the Egyptian as he should", it is necessary to consider the age in life that important astrological events occur. This is to ensure the prediction will "harmonise those details which are contemplated in temporal terms with that which is suitable and possible for persons in the various age-classes" and avoid out-of-context predictions such as imminent marriage for a young child, or "to an extremely old man the begetting of children or anything else that fits younger men". This leads into a discussion of the planetary themes of the seven ages of life which:

...for likeness and comparison depends upon the order of the seven planets; it begins with the first age of man and with the first sphere from us, that is, the moon's, and ends with the last of the ages and the outermost of the planetary spheres, which is called that of Saturn.

The information in the passage can be summarised as follows:

Planet	Period	Years	Age	Planetary theme
Moon	first 4 years	0–3	babyhood	suppleness, growth, changeability, nourishment of the body
Mercury	next 10 years	4–13	childhood	development of intelligence, articulation, physical and mental dexterity
Venus	next 8 years	14–21	youth	impulse towards love and sexuality, burning passion, guile
Sun	next 19 years	22–40	early manhood	responsibilities, ambition, substance, decorum, change from playfulness
Mars	next 15 years	41–55	later manhood	severity, realisation of passing prime, labour to complete life-tasks
Jupiter	next 12 years	56–67	full maturity	fulfilment, retirement, independence, dignity, deliberation, honour
Saturn	all remaining years	68–death	old age	coldness, weakness, decline, impediments, dispiritedness

The book ends with a brief discussion of astronomical and symbolic cycles used in the prediction of timed events, which includes mention of (primary) directions, annual profections, ingresses, lunations and transits.

The translator of the Loeb 1940 English translation, F. E. Robbins, reports a "puzzling problem" regarding the final paragraph of the book. One group of manuscripts have either been left unconcluded or supplied with text that matches an Anonymous Paraphrase of the work (speculatively attributed to Proclus); the other presents text which is the same in general content, but longer, according with manuscripts that were transmitted through Arabic translations. Robbins considers it certain that the ending which concurs with the text of the Paraphrase is spurious. Robert Schmidt, the English translator of the later Project Hindsight edition agrees with his choice, stating that the text of the latter "sounds more generally Ptolemaic".

Robbins explains that the lack of an ending usually occurs when ancient books are compiled in the form of a codex rather than a roll. Since the Paraphrase edition of the Tetrabiblos aimed to present the work's meaning without Ptolemy's own complicated style of text construction, Robbins says that he "cannot conceive how anyone (except perhaps Ptolemy) could have reversed the process and evolved the tortuous, crabbed Greek of the latter from the comparatively simple language of the former". He therefore offers both versions of the ending whilst lending his support to that which is found in the Arabic version of the text. This has the book conclude with Ptolemy declaring "since the topic of nativities has been summarily reviewed, it would be well to bring this procedure also to a fitting close".

== Criticism ==
Despite Ptolemy's prominence as a philosopher, the Dutch historian of science Eduard Jan Dijksterhuis criticizes the Tetrabiblos, stating that "it only remain puzzling that the very writer of the Almagest, who had taught how to develop astronomy from accurate observations and mathematical constructions, could put together such a system of superficial analogies and unfounded assertions."

== Editions and translations ==
No original manuscripts of the text have survived; its contents are known from translations, fragments, paraphrased copies, commentaries and later Greek manuscripts. Astrological researcher Deborah Houlding, in an analysis of how specific points agree or vary between different editions, suggests that areas of conflicting details have been affected by three main streams of transmission: manuscripts that have passed through Arabic translation; those based on a paraphrased edition, and manuscripts that are dated four centuries later than the Arabic ones, but which have not undergone translation out of Greek.

=== Arabic translations ===
The oldest extant manuscript is an Arabic translation compiled in the 9th century by Hunayn ibn Ishaq. This was first translated into Latin, in Barcelona, by Plato de Tivoli in 1138 and became influential as the first complete introduction of Ptolemy's astrological work in medieval Europe. It survives in at least nine manuscripts and five Renaissance printings.

Other Latin translations made from Arabic sources include an anonymous (unpublished) work compiled in 1206 and another of the 13th century by Egidio Tebaldi (Aegidius de Thebaldis). Typically, the Latin translations made from Arabic texts were circulated with a commentary compiled by Ali ibn Ridwan (Haly) in the 11th century.

Egidio Tebaldi's translation was first published by Erhard Ratdolt in 1484 together with Haly's commentary and a "pseudo-Ptolemaic" list of aphorisms known as the Centiloquium. This has been described as "the creature of late-fifteenth-century Italian presses".

=== Paraphrase based editions ===
An anonymous Greek paraphrase is speculatively attributed to the 5th-century philosopher Proclus. It is often referred to as the Proclus' Paraphrase although its authenticity is questioned, being described as "very doubtful" by Professor Stephan Heilen. The content of the Paraphrase is close to that of manuscripts of the Tetrabiblos, but it uses simplified text with the aim of providing what Heilen calls "a more easily understandable version of the difficult original work".

There is no modern critical edition of this text. The oldest extant manuscript is dated to the 10th century and housed in the Vatican Library (Ms. Vaticanus gr.1453, S. X., ff.1–219). Some of the text of the Paraphrase was published with a Latin translation and Preface by Philipp Melanchthon in Basel, 1554, but this was not widely circulated. A full reproduction with an accompanying Latin translation was made around 1630 by the Vatican scholar Leo Allatius "for his own private gratification" and this was published by the Elzevir typsetters in Leiden, 1635, apparently without Allatius's knowledge or consent.

Allatius' Latin translation was used as the source of all English translations of the Tetrabiblos prior to the Robbins' edition of 1940. These include translations made by John Whalley (1701); the Whalley "corrected edition" made by Ebenezer Sibly and his brother (1786); J.M. Ashmand (1822); James Wilson (1828); and other 19th-century privately circulated manuscripts such as that of John Worsdale.

=== Greek manuscripts ===
Although no copies of Ptolemy's original manuscript remain, there are other ancient works, such as Hephaistio's Apotelesmatics I, which describe or reproduce some of its passages. These have been used to help verify disputed areas of content.

The oldest fairly complete Greek manuscript of the text (rather than the paraphrased edition made of it) is dated to the 13th century. Two or three others are dated to the 14th century but most are dated to the 15th and 16th centuries. In the 'Introduction' to his 1940's translation, Frank Eggleston Robbins reported the existence of at least 35 manuscripts containing all or a large part of the Tetrabiblos in European libraries.

The first printed edition was made in 1535 with an accompanying Latin translation by the German classical scholar Joachim Camerarius. This was reprinted in 1553 and is "notable for offering the first Latin translation based upon a Greek rather than Arabic source". Robbins noted the page numbers of the 1553 edition in the Greek text which faces his English translation, stating "My collations have been made against Camerarius' second edition, because thus far this has been the standard text and it was most convenient".

Also in 1940, a Greek critical edition was published by Teubner, in Germany, based on the unpublished work of Franz Boll which was completed by his student Emilie Boer. Robbins expressed regret at not being able to refer to this in the preparation of his English translation.

In 1994 the 'Boll-Boer' edition became the basis of a serialised English translation by Robert Schmidt, published by Project Hindsight. The 'Translator's Preface' was critical of Robbins' understanding of some of the "conceptual issues involved" and argued the need for a new English translation which recognised the "probable superiority of the Teubner text edited by Boll and Boer in 1940".

The most recent critical edition of the Greek text was made by the German scholar Professor Wolfgang Hübner, and published by Teubner in 1998. Based on 33 complete and 14 partial manuscripts, Hübner also incorporated the unpublished notes of Boer and the reasoning given in the Robbins and Boll-Boer editions. This is now considered the authoritative edition. A reviewer's comment in The Classical Review declares of it "Progress over previous editions is evident on virtually every page".

Translators of the Tetrabiblos and associated texts
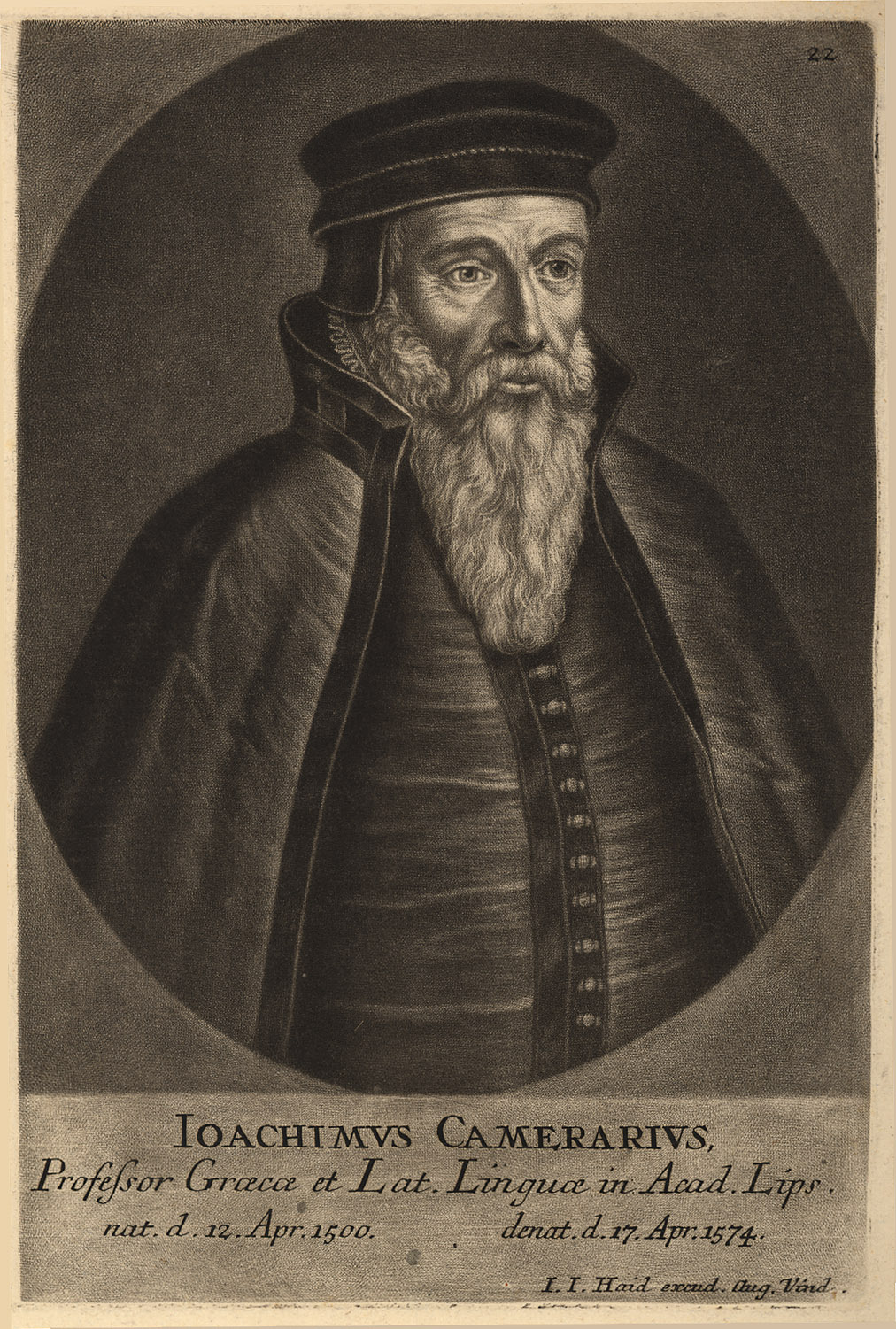
Joachim Camerarius (1500–1574). Translator of the first printed Greek edition of the Tetrabiblos.

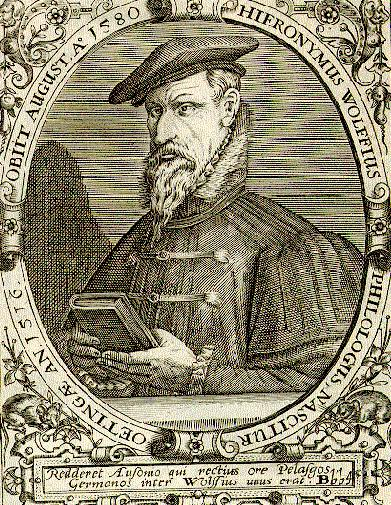
Hieronymus Wolf (1516–1580). Translator of the first printed Latin edition of the Commentary.

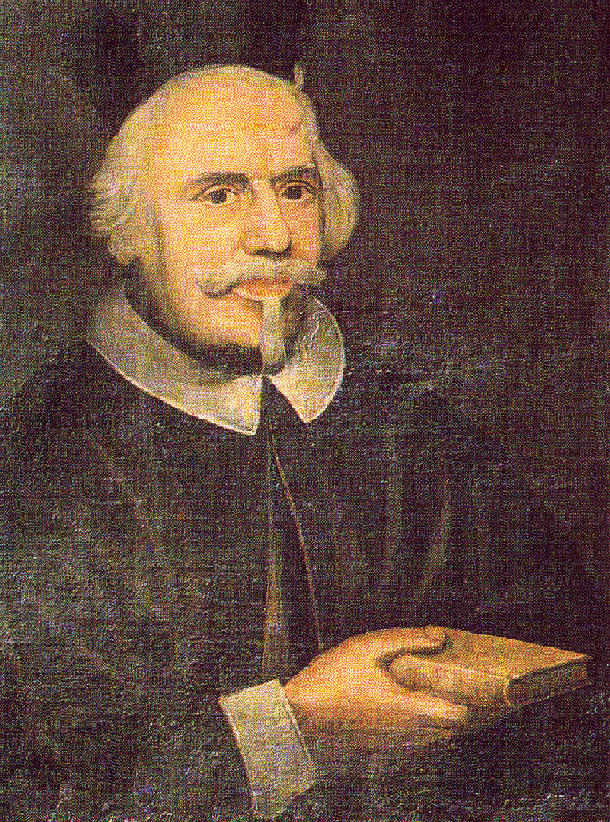
Leo Allatius (1585–1669). Translator of the first printed Greek edition of the Paraphrase.

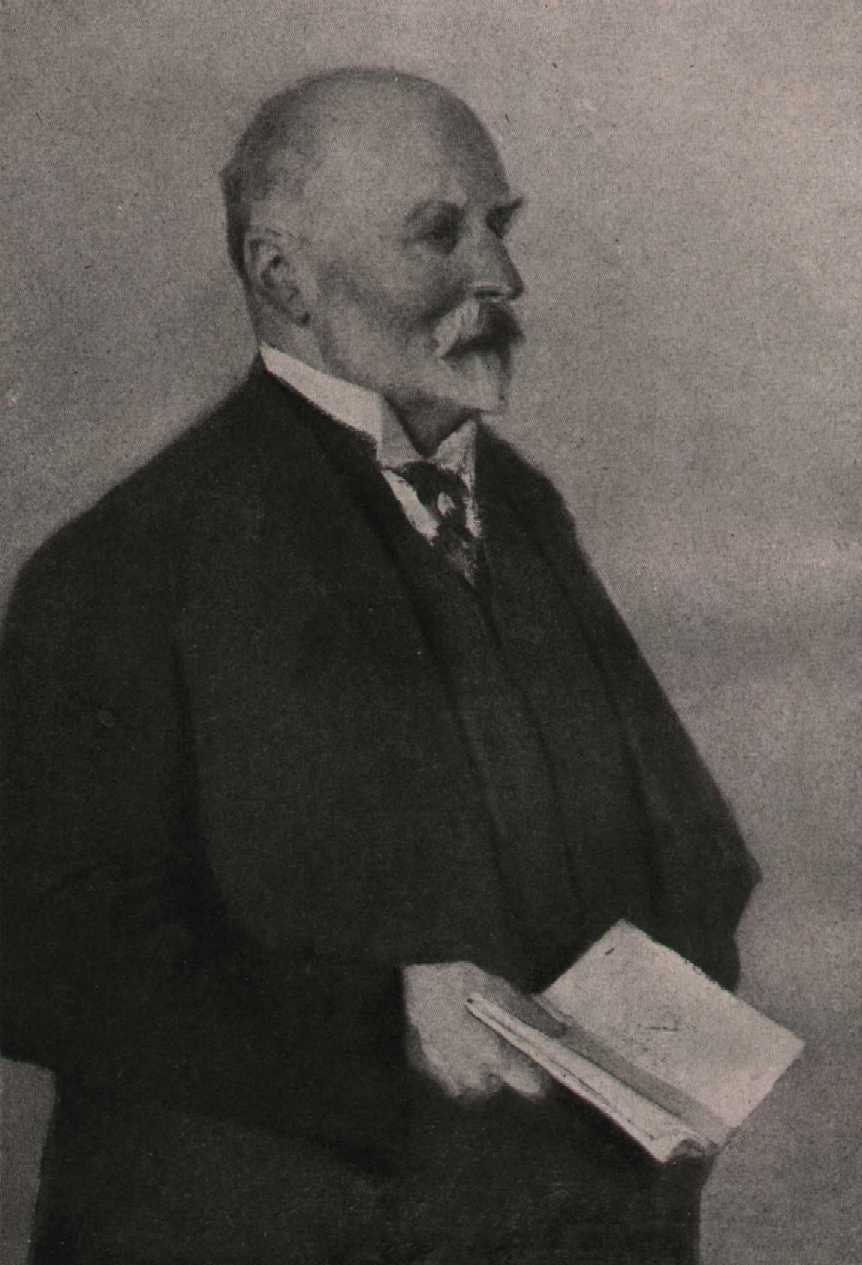
Franz Boll (1867–1924). Translator (with Boer) of Teubner Greek edition (1940) of the Tetrabiblos.

== Associated texts ==
=== Commentary ===
In addition to the Arabic commentary on the Tetrabiblos made by Ali ibn Ridwan (Haly) in the 11th century, significant attention is given to an anonymous Greek Commentary, which has older, obscure origins. It was written at an uncertain date, in either late antiquity or the Byzantine period. This is also attributed to Proclus, as the presumed author of the Paraphrase, although Heilen has remarked that such an attribution "looks like guesswork". Houlding has also pointed out that differences in tabulated information presented within the Paraphrase and the Commentary "is a telling argument that both cannot be the work of the same author".

The Greek Commentary was first printed in 1559 with an accompanying Latin translation by Hieronymus Wolf. This claimed to be based on a heavily corrupted manuscript which required numerous conjectures by a scholarly friend of Wolf, who preferred to remain anonymous rather than face reproaches for "dabbling in this sort of literature". Wolf's edition was bound with an Introduction to the Tetrabiblos, attributed (speculatively) to Porphyry, and the scholia of Demophilus.

The purpose of the Commentary was to offer demonstrated illustrations and fuller explanation of the astrological principles described by Ptolemy. Following Wolf's edition, large passages were incorporated into Latin astrological works which featured extensive collections of example horoscopes. Two notable examples are Jerome Cardan's Ptolemaei De Astrorvm Ivdiciis (Basel, 1578) and Francisco Junctinus's Speculum Astrologiae (Lugduni, 1583). Modern translators continue to make reference to the Hieronymous Wolf Commentary in their explanatory annotations.

=== Centiloquium ===
The Centiloquium 'one hundred (sayings)' was the common Latin title of a collection of 100 important astrological aphorisms. It was also known in Latin as Liber Fructus (Arabic: Kitab al-Tamara; Hebrew: Sefer ha-Peri) 'Book of the Fruit'. The latter reflected the belief that this offered a summation of Ptolemy's key astrological principles, and therefore presented "The Fruit of his Four Books". It began, as all Ptolemy's works did, with a dedication to "Syrus", which helped support the assumption of the work's Ptolemaic authenticity.

Early manuscripts were commonly accompanied by a commentary on their use authored by Ahmad ibn Yusuf al-Misri (835–912). This became translated into Latin at the same time as translations were being made of the Arabic editions of the Tetrabiblos. The earliest translations were made by Johannes Hispanensis in 1136 and Plato of Tivoli in 1138.

Ali ibn Ridwan (Haly), who had produced the Arabic commentary on Ptolemy's work, noticed that the aphorisms highlighted principles of interrogational astrology, and wondered why Ptolemy had not included coverage of these themes in his Tetrabiblos. Jerome Cardan was the first to declare the work a forgery based on such differences, referring in his commentary on the Tetrabiblos to an argument of Galen: "In the old days, kings who were trying to establish great libraries bought the books of famous men at very high prices. By doing so they caused men to ascribe their own works to the ancients".

The authorship of the text is now ascribed to "Pseudo-Ptolemy". Some scholars suggest that Ahmad ibn Yusuf was its true author. Others believe that the Centiloquium, though not Ptolemy's, may preserve some collation of authentic materials from Hellenistic astrology. Ultimately, the historical assumption that the Centiloquium was part of Ptolemy's astrological legacy gave it widespread influence in the medieval period, by which it became established as an important text within the astrological tradition.

== See also ==
- Babylonian astronomy – the ancient sources transmitted to Ptolemy
- Greek astronomy – the astronomy of Ptolemy's era
- Ptolemy's world map – map of the ancient world as described by Ptolemy

== Works cited ==
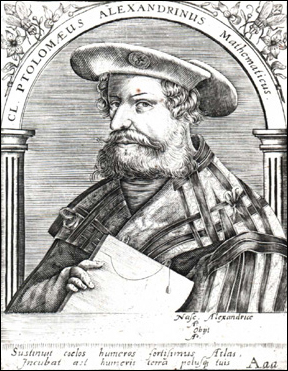
Ptolemy as imagined in 16th-century woodcut by Theodor de Bry. Caption reads: Sustinuit caelos humeros fortisimus Atlas; Incubat ast humeris terra polusque tuis — 'Powerful Atlas held up the heavens on his shoulders: but the very Earth and its pole rest on yours'.

- Ashmand, J. M., (ed.) 1822. Ptolemy’s Tetrabiblos London: Davis and Dickson. Reprinted, Bel Air, MD: Astrology Classics, 2002. ISBN 978-1-933303-12-3.
- Avelar, Helena and Ribeiro, Luis, 2010. On the Heavenly Spheres: A Treatise on Traditional Astrology. Tempe, AZ: American Federation of Astrologers. ISBN 0-86690-609-6.
- Berggren, J. L. and Goldstein, B. R., (eds.) 1987. From Ancient Omens to Statistical Mechanics: Essays on the Exact Sciences presented to Asger Aaboe, vol. 39 . Copenhagen: University Library. ISBN 978-87-7709-002-8.
- Burnett, Charles and Greenbaum, Dorian Gieseler, (eds.) 2007. Culture and Cosmos: The Winding Courses of the Stars: Essays in Ancient Astrology, vol. 11 no 1 and 2, spring/summer and autumn/winter. Bristol, UK: Culture and Cosmos, ISSN 1368-6534.
- Evans, James, 1998. The History & Practice of Ancient Astronomy. Oxford: Oxford University Press. ISBN 978-0-19-509539-5.
- Evans, James, and Berggren, J. Lennart, 2006. Geminos's introduction to the phenomena. Princeton, NJ: Princeton University Press. ISBN 978-0-691-12339-4.
- Falconer, William Armistead (ed.) 1923. Cicero: De senectute, De amicitia, De divinatione (Latin text with English translation). Cambridge, Mass.: Harvard University Press; London: W. Heinemann. ISBN 978-0-674-99170-5.
- Grafton, Amthony, 1999. Cardano's Cosmos. Cambridge, Mass; London: Harvard University Press. ISBN 978-0-674-09555-7.
- Grasshoff, Gerd, 1990. The History of Ptolemy's Star Catalogue. New York: Springer-Verlag. ISBN 978-0-387-97181-0.
- Houlding, Deborah, 1993. 'The Life and Work of Ptolemy', Traditional Astrologer; Issue 1, pp.3–6. Nottingham: Ascella. Reproduced on Skyscript (retrieved 16 November 2011).
- Houlding, Deborah, 2006. 'Ptolemy's Centiloquium transcribed and annotated' (based on Henry Coley's English translation, published as chapter 20 of his Clavis Astrologiae Elimata; London, B. Tooke and T. Sawbridge, 1676. OCLC 4731519). Reproduced on Skyscript (retrieved 16 November 2011).
- Hübner, Wolfgang, 1998. Claudii Ptolemaei opera quae exstant omnia 1, Apotelesmatika (Most recent critical edition of the Greek text). Stuttgart: Teubner. ISBN 978-3-519-01746-2.
- Jensen, Derek, 2006. The science of the stars in Danzig from Rheticus to Hevelius. San Diego: University of California. ISBN 978-0-542-90624-4.
- Jones, Alexander (ed.), 2010. Ptolemy in Perspective: Use and Criticism of his Work from Antiquity to the Nineteenth Century. Dordrecht; New York: Springer. ISBN 978-90-481-2787-0.
- Kieckhefer, Richard, 2000. Magic in the Middle Ages. Cambridge; New York: Cambridge University Press. ISBN 978-0-521-78576-1.
- Lehoux, Daryn, 2006. 'Tomorrow's news today: astrology, fate and the way out', Representations; 95.1: 105-122. California: University of California Press. ISSN 0734-6018.
- Lilly, William, 1647. Christian Astrology. London: John Partridge and Humphrey Partridge. Republished in facsimile, London: Regulus, 1985. ISBN 0-948472-00-6.
- Lindberg, David C., 2007. The beginnings of western science: the European scientific tradition in philosophical, religious, and institutional context, prehistory to A.D. 1450. Chicago: University of Chicago Press. ISBN 978-0-226-48205-7.
- Long, Anthony, 1982. 'Astrology: Arguments pro and contra', Science and Speculation: Studies in Hellenistic Theory and Practice; edited by Jonathon Barnes et al., pp.165–192. Cambridge: Cambridge University Press. ISBN 978-0-521-24689-7.
- Luck, Georg, 2006. Arcana Mundi (2nd ed.). Baltimore: Johns Hopkins University Press. ISBN 978-0-8018-8345-3.
- North, John David, 1989. Stars, minds, and fate: essays in ancient and medieval cosmology. London: Hambledon Press. ISBN 978-0-907628-94-1.
- Pecker, Jean Claude, 2001. Understanding the Heavens: Thirty Centuries of Astronomical Ideas from Ancient Thinking to Modern Cosmology. Berlin; London: Springer. ISBN 3-540-63198-4.
- Ramesey, William, 1654. Astrologia restaurata, or, Astrologie restored. London: Nathaniel Elkins. OCLC 606757518.
- Riley, Mark, 1974. 'Theoretical and Practical Astrology: Ptolemy and His Colleagues', Transactions of the American Philological Association ; vol. 117, pp.235–236. Baltimore; London: Johns Hopkins University Press. ISSN 0360-5949.
- Riley, Mark, 1988. 'Science and Tradition in the Tetrabiblos', Proceedings of the American Philolosophical Society; vol. 132, no. 1, pp. 67–84. Philadelphia: American Philosophical Society. ISSN 0003-049X.
- Robbins, Frank E. (ed.) 1940. Tetrabiblos. Cambridge, Massachusetts: Harvard University Press (Loeb Classical Library). ISBN 0-674-99479-5.
- Rudhyar, Dane, 1936. The Astrology of Personality. New York: Lucis. OCLC 1547769.
- Saliba, George, 1994. A History of Arabic Astronomy: Planetary Theories During the Golden Age of Islam. New York: New York University Press. ISBN 978-0-8147-8023-7.
- Sela, Shlomo, 2003. Abraham Ibn Ezra and the rise of medieval Hebrew science. Leiden; Boston: Brill. ISBN 978-90-04-12973-3.
- Schmidt, Robert, 1994–8. Tetrabiblos, vols. 1–4. Berkeley Springs: Project Hindsight.
- Smith, Mark A., 2006. Ptolemy's theory of visual perception: an English translation of the Optics. Philadelphia: American Philosophical Society. ISBN 978-0-87169-862-9.
- Tarnas, Richard, 1991. The Passion Of The Western Mind: Understanding the Ideas That Have Shaped Our World View. New York: Harmony Books. ISBN 978-0-517-57790-5.
- Tester, Jim, 1987. A history of western astrology. New Hampshire: Boydell and Brewer. ISBN 978-0-85115-446-6.
- Taliaferro, Robert Catesby, and Wallis, Charles Glenn, 1955. Ptolemy's Almagest. Great books of the Western world, vol.16. Chicago: Encyclopædia Britannica. OCLC 342062.
- Thomas, Keith, 1971. Religion and the decline of magic: studies in popular beliefs in sixteenth and seventeenth century England. London: Weidenfeld and Nicolson. ISBN 978-0-297-00220-8.
- Thorndike, Lynn, 1923–58. A History of Magic and Experimental Science, vols. 1-12. New York: Macmillan; Columbia University Press. OCLC 645400199.
- Tymieniecka, Anna-Teresa, 2010. Astronomy and Civilisation in the New Enlightenment: Passions of the Skies. Dordrecht: Springer. ISBN 978-90-481-9747-7.
- Webster, Charles, 1979. Health, medicine, and mortality in the sixteenth century. Cambridge; New York: Cambridge University Press. ISBN 978-0-521-22643-1.
- Westman, Robert S., 2011. The Copernican Question: Prognostication, Scepticism, and Celestial Order. California: University of California Press. ISBN 978-0-520-25481-7.
