= Eliezer the Astronomer =

Eliezer the Astronomer (Hebrew: אליעזר החוזה or התוכן; fl. 16th century) was a German Jewish scholar, known for his contributions to astrological literature.

He authored Ge Ḥizzayon ('Valley of Vision'), an astrological compilation that draws from Hebrew, Arabic, and Latin sources. The work references Abraham bar Ḥiyya ha-Nasi, Ibn Ezra, Andruzagar, Albumasar, 'Ali ibn Riḍwan, 'Ali ibn Rajil, Leopold of Austria, Johannes, Guido Bonatti, and possibly Copernicus, as suggested by Dukes.

In the introduction to Ge Ḥizzayon, Eliezer mentions that he began a great work on astrology, a chapter of which, titled Reshit Ḥokmah, is dedicated to Ibn Ezra. There is some uncertainty about whether the Sefer ha-Goralot (Vatican Manuscript no. 216), which bears the name "Eliezer," was authored by him. Similar uncertainty surrounds Vatican Manuscript no. 477, which contains a commentary on Ptolemy's Centiloquium and is also attributed to someone named Eliezer.
