= Bethem's Centiloquium =

Bethem's Centiloquium is a collection of one hundred astrological aphorisms attributed to Muhammad ibn Jabir al-Battani (c.858–929), also known as Albategnius, or in astrology as Bethem.

The text also exists in many manuscripts as De consuetudinibus ("According to the customs"), ascribed to Abraham ibn Ezra (1089–1164).

== See also ==
- Centiloquium
- Centiloquium Hermetis
