= Centiloquium Hermetis =

The Centiloquium Hermetis is a Latin collection of one hundred astrological aphorisms attributed to Hermes Trismegistus, compiled and translated from Greek by Stephen of Messina for King Manfred of Sicily (r. 1258–1266).

== Authorship and sources ==
At least 22 of the aphorisms are ultimately derived from the Mudhākarāt Abī Maʿshar fi asrār ʿilm al-nujūm, a collection of sayings of Abū Maʿshar (787–886) compiled by his student, Abū Saʿīd Shādhān ibn Bahr. The Mudhākarāt was included with other texts by Abū Maʿshar in the Mysteria, a Greek translation from around 1000. The Greek text was excerpted and translated into Latin as Excerpta de secretis Albumasar. The relationship between the Centiloquium and the Excerpta is uncertain, but their wording is different. At least one other aphorism can be traced to Māshāʾallāh, but the exact wording is different between the Centiloquium and an earlier translation, De interpretationibus. Charles Burnett suggests that Stephen's source for the Centiloquium was an existing Greek compendium, but it cannot be ruled out that he authored some of the aphorisms himself. He may have been working from an Arabic source.

The first letter of each aphorism together form an acrostic that reads:

Domino Manfrido inclito Regi Sicilie Stefanus de Messana hos flores de secretis astrologie divi Hermetis transtulit.

Translation:

Stephen of Messina translated these flowers from the secrets of astrology of the divine Hermes for Lord Manfred, the famous king of Sicily.

== Contents ==
The aphorisms cover weather, harvests, travel, illness, war, etc. Several seem chosen specifically for the king.

== Transmission ==
During the Middle Ages, the Centiloquium Hermetis was exceeded in popularity among Hermetic treatises only by the Asclepius. It is preserved in over 80 manuscripts. It was printed 16 times between 1484 and 1674, including two further incunable editions (1492, 1493).

Henry Coley published an English translation in 1676.

== See also ==
- Centiloquium
- Bethem's Centiloquium
