= Dane Rudhyar =

American astrologer (1895–1985)

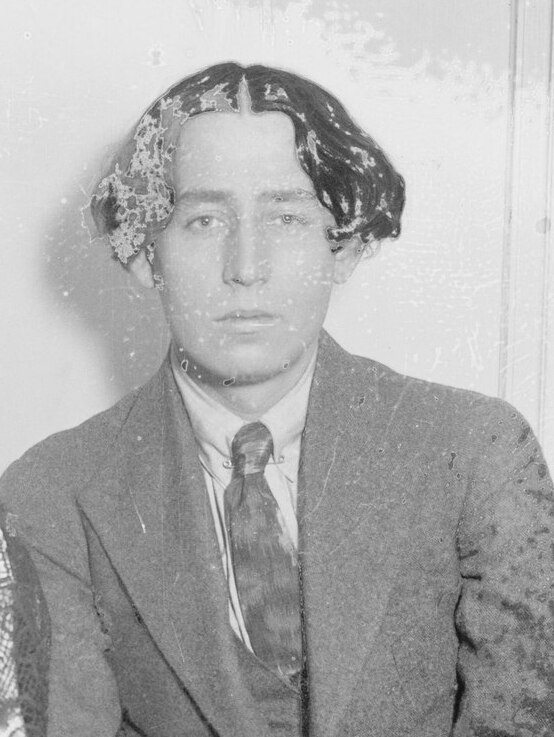
- Born: March 23, 1895; Paris, France
- Died: September 13, 1985 (aged 90); San Francisco, California, United States
- Occupations: Author, modernist composer, astrologer
- Musical career
- Genres: Classical; Modernist

Dane Rudhyar (March 23, 1895 – September 13, 1985), born Daniel Chennevière, was an American author, modernist composer, painter and humanistic astrologer. He was a pioneer of modern transpersonal astrology.

== Biography ==
Dane Rudhyar was born in Paris on March 23, 1895. At the age of 12, a severe illness and surgery disabled him, and he turned to music and intellectual development to compensate for his lack of physical agility. He studied at the Sorbonne, University of Paris (graduating at the age of 16), and at the Paris Conservatoire. His early ventures into philosophy and his association with the artistic community in Paris led to his conviction that all existence is cyclical in character. Influenced by Nietzsche as a youth, Rudhyar envisioned himself as a "seed man" of new age cultural evolution.

In November 1916, Rudhyar's music brought him to New York City, where his orchestral arrangements and original compositions were performed on April 4, 1917, at a performance of Métachorie by the New York Metropolitan Opera. This was one of the first polytonal pieces of music performed in the United States. He also met Sasaki Roshi, one of the early Japanese Zen teachers in America, who led him in the study of Oriental philosophy and occultism. During this period from 1917 to 1919, spent partly in New York City, partly in Canada, and partly in Philadelphia he adopted the name "Rudhyar" a cognate of several attractive Sanskrit words including the name of the god Rudra. His interest was further stimulated by his association with Theosophy, which began when he was asked to compose music for a production at the society's headquarters in Los Angeles in 1920. Rudhyar became a naturalized citizen of the United States in 1926. He stayed in California (often commuting to New York) through the 1920s and in 1930 married Marla Contento, secretary to independent Theosophist Will Levington Comfort. Comfort introduced Rudhyar to Marc Edmund Jones, who in turn introduced him to astrology. Rudhyar received mimeographed lessons on astrology from Jones.

Rudhyar learned astrology during a period when he was also studying the psychological writings of Carl Gustav Jung, and he began to think in terms of bringing astrology and Jungian psychology together. Rudhyar also cites Jan Smuts' book Holism and Evolution as an influence. The marriage between astrology and depth-psychology overcame some basic problems, including astrology's deterministic approach to life and the trouble of designating an agreeable agent to produce the astrological effects. Rudhyar postulated that the stars did not cause the effects seen in human life but were pictures synchronistically aligned to human beings. They detailed psychological forces working in individuals, but did not override human freedom in responding to those forces, he said. At first he called his new interpretation "harmonic astrology" and as the ideas matured renamed it "humanistic astrology," the subject of his monumental volume, The Astrology of Personality, published in 1936. A friend, Theosophist Alice A. Bailey (the person who invented the term New Age), encouraged the development of his thought and published his book on her press, Lucis Publishing. His initial writings were regular articles in Paul Clancy's magazine American Astrology and Grant Lewi's Horoscope Magazine.

Following his divorce in 1945, Rudhyar married the dancer Eya Fechin. Eya was the daughter of the well-known Russian-American painter Nicolai Fechin, with whom Rudhyar also became acquainted. It was at this time that Rudhyar began to undertake his larger-scale paintings. Rudhyar and Eya lived in Colorado, New Mexico, Iowa and New York, before eventually divorcing in 1953.

Over the next two decades Rudhyar continued to write and lecture on astrology, but while he was honored within the astrological community he was little known outside of it. It was not until the 1970s, as the New Age movement emerged, that major publishing houses discovered him and began to publish his writings: among the first was The Practice of Astrology, published in 1970 by Penguin Books.

In 1969 Rudhyar founded the International Committee for Humanistic Astrology, a small professional society that would work on the development of his perspective. He began one of the most fruitful periods of his life, turning out several books a year for the next decade. He began to absorb the insights of transpersonal psychology, which concentrated on exploring altered and exalted states of perception, and by the mid-1970s had moved beyond humanistic astrology to what he termed "transpersonal astrology." He also began to reflect upon the New Age movement and wrote several of the more sophisticated volumes on planetary consciousness and New Age philosophy.

Dane Rudhyar died on September 13, 1985, in San Francisco, California.

== Astrological writings ==
Most of Rudhyar's more than forty books and hundreds of articles concern astrology and spirituality. The book that established his reputation in the astrological field was his first on the subject, The Astrology of Personality (1936). Arguing that astrology is not essentially predictive but rather productive of intuitive insights, The Astrology of Personality was one of the most influential tracts of "free-will" astrology, despite being written in the dense, circuitous style that characterizes much of Rudhyar's writing.

Rudhyar's astrological works were influential in the New Age movement of the 1960s and 1970s, especially among the hippies of San Francisco, where he lived and gave frequent lectures. Rudhyar regarded the 'true early hippies' as potential harbingers of a New Age. In 1967 the scene reached its peak in the Summer of Love in San Francisco." Most notably, Dane Rudhyar predicted in 1972 that the Age of Aquarius would begin in 2062.

== Fiction novels ==
Dane Rudhyar also wrote several novels:

- When Cosmic Love Awakens – A Transpersonal Love Story was written and published in 1952.
- Rania – An Epic Narrative was written in 1930 and first published in 1973.
- Return from No Return (subtitled 'A Paraphysical Novel') was also first published in 1973.

== Transcendental art ==
Dane Rudhyar joined the Transcendental Painting Group in Santa Fe, New Mexico in 1938 and 1939. The idea behind transcendental painting and drawing was to paint or draw images of Jungian archetypes. Transcendental painting may be considered a cousin of surrealist art and a precursor of the cosmic art of the 1950s, the psychedelic art of the 1960s, and the visionary art of the 1970s. Throughout his career, Dane Rudhyar continued to paint and draw new transcendental artwork, or use artwork he had previously painted, to illustrate his pamphlets and books about astrology.

== Writings on music and musical compositions ==
Dane Rudhyar wrote extensively on music as well, producing such books as Claude Debussy and His Work (1913), Dissonant Harmony (1928), Rebirth of Hindu Music (1928), The New Sense of Sound (1930), and The Magic of Tone and the Art of Music (1982).

Rudhyar's own compositions tend to employ dissonant harmony, emphatically not of a systematic variety such as Charles Seeger's; Rudhyar was philosophically opposed to such a rigid approach. His musical thought was influenced by Henri Bergson and theosophy, and he viewed composers as mediums, writing that "the new composer" was "no longer a 'composer,' but an evoker, a magician. His material is his musical instrument, a living thing, a mysterious entity endowed with vital laws of its own, sneering at formulas, fearfully alive." Rudhyar's most distinctive music is for piano, including his Tetragram (1920–67) and Pentagram (1924–26) series, Syntony (1919–24, rev. 1967), and Granites (1929). His works are almost all composed of brief movements—he felt that length and its attendant structural demands led to abstraction and away from the sensuous physicality of sound. He influenced several early-20th-century composers including Ruth Crawford and Carl Ruggles, as well as members of the group centered around Henry Cowell known as the "ultra-modernists." Cowell paid homage to him with a solo piano piece, A Rudhyar (1924).

Late in his life, Rudhyar's musical work was rediscovered by the composers James Tenney, Hsiung-Zee Wong, and Peter Garland, who declared that Rudhyar's "best works occurred in the 1920s and...1970s!!!" In 1983 Glenn Branca dedicated his Symphony No. 3 : Gloria to Rudhyar.

== Bibliography ==
- Chennevière, Daniel Claude Debussy et Son Oeuvre Paris: Durand, 1913.
- Rudhyar, Dane Rhapsodies (Première Série) Ottawa: Imprimerie Beauregard, 1919.
- Rudhyar, Dane "The Birth of the 20th century Piano: Concerning John Hays Hammond's New Device." Eolus 5, 14–17, 1926 (On "the new composer": p. 15.).
- Rudhyar, Dane Toward Man: Poems Carmel: The Seven Arts, 1928.
- Rudhyar, Dane Dissonant Harmony: A New Principle of Musical and Social Organization Carmel: Hamsa Publications, 1928. (Subtitled Seed-Ideas No. 1 when Printed by the Halcyon Press, Halcyon, California)
- Rudhyar, Dane The New Sense Of Space: A Reorientation of the Creative Faculty in Man Carmel: Hamsa Publications, 1929. (Subtitled Seed-Ideas No. 2 when Printed by the Halcyon Press, Halcyon, California)
- Rudhyar, Dane The Cycle of Culture and Sacrifice Carmel: Hamsa Publications, 1929. (Subtitled Seed-Ideas No. 3 when Printed by the Halcyon Press, Halcyon, California)
- Rudhyar, Dane Art of Gestures and Art of Patterns Carmel: Hamsa Publications, 1929. (Subtigled Seed-Ideas No. 4 when Printed by the Halcyon Press, Halcyon, California)
- Rudhyar, Dane Art as Release of Power Carmel: Hamsa Publications, 1929. (Subtitled Seed-Ideas No. 5 when Printed by the Halcyon Press, Halcyon, California)
- Rudhyar, Dane Synthetic Drama as a Seed of Civilization Carmel: Hamsa Publications, 1929. (Subtitled Seed-Ideas No. 6. when Printed by the Halcyon Press, Halcyon, California)
- Rudhyar, Dane Education, Instruction, Initiation 1929. (Seed Ideas 1–6 series)
- Rudhyar, Dane The New Individual and the Work of Civilization Carmel: Hamsa Publications, (no date, c. 1930) (Subtitled Seed-Ideas No. 7 when Printed by the Halcyon Press, Halcyon, California)
- Rudhyar, Dane Art as Release of Power: A Series of Seven Essays on the Philosophy of Art (Seed-Ideas—First Series) Carmel: Hamsa, 1930. Contains:

1. Dissonant Harmony, A New Principle of Musical and Social Organization. 1928. 2. The New Sense of Space, A Reorientation of the Creative Faculty in Man. 3. The Cycle of Culture and Sacrifice. 4. Art of Gestures and Art of Patterns. 5. Art as Release of Power. 6. The Synthetic Drama as a Seed of Civilization. 7. The New Individual and the Work of Civilization

- Rudhyar, Dane The Astrology of Personality: A Reformulation of Astrological Concepts and Ideals, in Terms of Contemporary Psychology and Philosophy New York: Lucis Publishing, 1936.
- Rudhyar, Dane New Mansions For New Men New York: Lucis Publishing, 1938. (The section titled Meditations at the Gates of Light is a mystical epic poem to the Zodiac.)
- Rudhyar, Dane White Thunder Santa Fe: Hazel Dreis Editions, 1938. (poems)
- Rudhyar, Dane The Transcendental Movement in the Arts [1939] (unpublished manuscript) (This work deals with modern dance as well as painting.)
- Rudhyar, Dane The Faith That Gives Meaning To Victory Hollywood: Foundation for Human Integration, 1942.
- Rudhyar, Dane Modern Man’s Conflicts: The Creative Challenge of a Global Society New York: Philosophical Library, 1948.
- Rudhyar, Dane Gifts Of The Spirit Los Angeles: New Age Publishing, 1956.
- Rudhyar, Dane The Pulse of Life. New Dynamics in Astrology The Netherlands: Servire-Wassenaar, 1963.
- Rudhyar, Dane The Lunation Cycle. A Key to the Understanding of Personality The Hague, Netherlands: Servire. Distributed in the United States by Llewellyn Publication, 1967.
- Rudhyar, Dane An Astrological Triptych: The Illuminated Road Santa Fe, New Mexico: Aurora Press, 1968.
- Rudhyar, Dane Astrology For New Minds: A Non-dualistic Harmonic Approach to Astrological Charts and to the Relation Between Man and the Universe Lakemont, Georgia: CSA Press, 1969.
- Rudhyar, Dane The Practice of Astrology New York: Penguin Books, 1970.
- Rudhyar, Dane The Astrological Houses: The Spectrum of Individual Experience Garden City, New York: Doubleday, 1972.
- Rudhyar, Dane Person-centered Astrology Lakemont, Ga.: CSA Press, 1972.
- Rudhyar, Dane The Planetarization of Consciousness New York: Harper, 1972.
- Rudhyar, Dane Astrological Timing: The Transition to the New Age New York: Harper & Row, 1972.
- Rudhyar, Dane An Astrological Mandala: The Cycle of Transformations and Its 360 Symbolic Phases, 1973.
- Rudhyar, Dane The Rhythm of Human Fulfillment:In Tune with Cosmic Cycles Palo Alto, California: The Seed Center, 1973.
- Rudhyar, Dane The Astrology of America's Destiny: A Birth Chart for the United States of America New York: Random House, 1974.
- Rudhyar, Dane The Sun Is Also A Star: The Galactic Dimension of Astrology New York: Dutton, 1975.
- Rudhyar, Dane From Humanistic to Transpersonal Astrology Palo Alto, California: The Seed Center, 1975.
- Rudhyar, Dane Occult Preparations for the New Age Wheaton, Ill.: Theosophical Publishing House, 1975.
- Rudhyar, Dane The Astrology of Transformation: A Multilevel Approach Wheaton, Ill.: Theosophical Publishing House, 1980.
- Rudhyar, Dane Rhythm of Wholeness: A Total Affirmation of Being Wheaton, Ill.: Theosophical Publishing House, 1983.
