= Pseudo-Ptolemy =

De imaginibus super facies signorum

Kitab al-Majalis

Liber de compositione universalis astrolabii

Canon Ptolomei et Pictagore de diversis eventibus secundum naturas planetarum

Pseudo-Ptolemy is a designation used for the authors of pseudepigrapha that appeared under the name of the astronomer and geographer Ptolemy. These are not authentic works of Ptolemy but were either forged in his name or were mistakenly taken to be his. Although Ptolemy wrote in Greek, Pseudo-Ptolemaic works are sometimes known only from translations or purported translations in Arabic and Latin. Many are of medieval origin.

== Works in Greek ==
- Centiloquium, a Latin translation from the Arabic Kitab al-Thamara, with the Greek version Karpos being either the original or a translation from Arabic
- De speculis, translated from a Greek original by William of Moerbeke
- De temporum mutatione, a translation from Greek often included as a chapter of the Latin Judicia
- Musica

== Works in both Arabic and Latin ==
- Maqala fi Dhawat al-dhawa'ib, known in Latin as De cometis, a work on the nine types of comets
- Opus imaginum or De imaginibus super facies signorum, the fragmentary Arabic Kitab al-Suwar

== Arabic pseudepigrapha ==
- al-Du'a' al-mustajab
- Ahkam al-shi'ra l-yamaniyya
- Kitab al-Ahjar
- Kitab al-Majalis
- Kitab Tali' al-mawlud mukhtasar li-l-rijal wa-l-nisa', jointly attributed to Ptolemy and "those wise Indians who are with him"
- Taqwim al-shi'ra l-yamaniyya, jointly attributed to Ptolemy, Hermes Trismegistus and al-Hakimi
- Tawali' al-buruj, jointly attributed to Ptolemy and Balaam

== Latin pseudepigrapha ==
- Archanum magni Dei de reductione geomancie ad orbem, an anonymous Christian text dedicated to an unnamed king of Castile but describing itself as a revelation of God to the Arab king Ptolemy
- Canon Ptolomei et Pictagore de diversis eventibus secundum naturas planetarum, jointly attributed to Ptolemy and Pythagoras,
- De motibus et iudiciis planetarum
- De occultatis, a short text attributed to Ptolemy in Mashallah ibn Athari's Book of Interpretations
- Dixerunt Ptholomeus et Hermes quod locus Lune, a short text often attached to the Latin Centiloquium as a chapter
- Inerrantium stellarum significationes
- Judicia, a work usually misattributed to Ptolemy but sometimes to Aristotle
- Liber de compositione universalis astrolabii, claims to be a translation from Arabic
- Liber figure
- Liber de impressionibus imaginum, anulorum et sigillorum secundum facies duodecim signorum zodiaci
- Liber de iudiciis partium, a chapter from Mashallah's Book of Nativities misattributed to Ptolemy in Latin translation
- Liber proiectionis radiorum stellarum, usually anonymous but in two manuscripts attributed to Ptolemy
- Liber Ptholomei regis Egiptii, a fragmentary treatise in which Ptolemy is confused with a member of the Ptolemaic dynasty
- Liber de nativitatibus hominum
