= Ali ibn Ridwan =

Egyptian astrologer and astronomer

Ali Ibn Ridwan
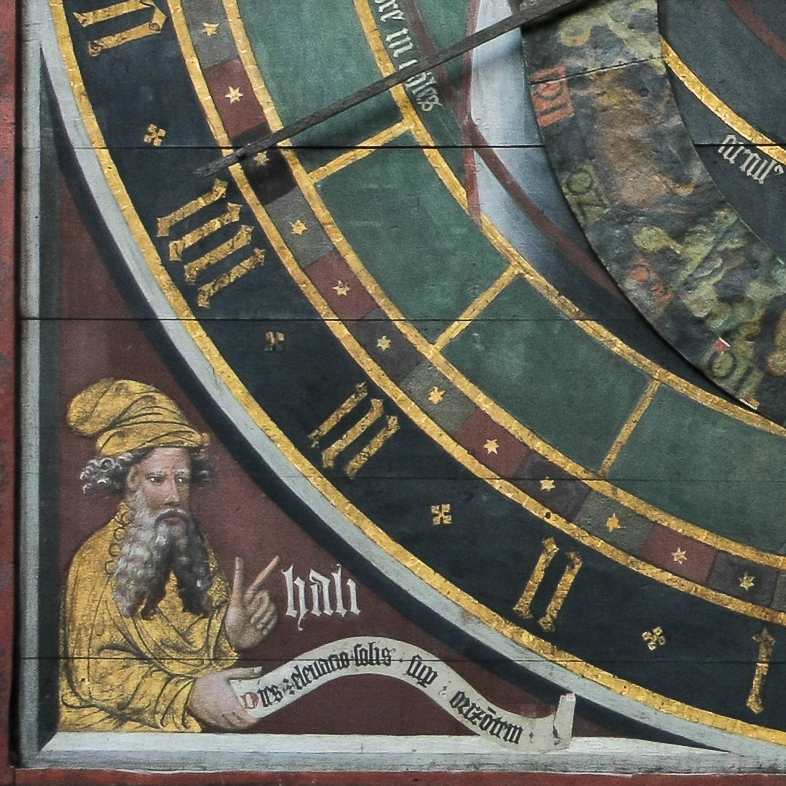
- 14th century painting of Ali Ibn Ridwan (astronomical clock in St. Nicholas' Church (Stralsund)
- Born: 988; Giza, now Egypt
- Died: 1061 (aged 73); Baghdad, Abbasid Caliphate, now Iraq
- Occupations: Physician, Astrologer, Astronomer
- Writing career
- Notable works: Commentator of Galen's Tetrabiblos, Commentator of Ancient Greek Medicine, De revolutionibus nativitatum, Tractatus de cometarum significationibus per xii signa zodiaci, On the Prevention of Bodily Ills in Egypt, Detailed of Supernova SN 1006

Abu'l Hassan Ali ibn Ridwan Al-Misri (Arabic: أبو الحسن علي بن رضوان بن علي بن جعفر المصري) (c. 988 - c. 1061) was an Arab who lived in Egypt and was a physician, astrologer and astronomer, born in Giza.

He was a commentator on ancient Greek medicine, and in particular on Galen; his commentary on Galen's Ars Parva was translated by Gerardo Cremonese. However, he is better known for providing the most detailed description of the supernova now known as SN 1006, the brightest stellar event in recorded history, which he observed in the year 1006. This was written in a commentary on Ptolemy's work Tetrabiblos.

He was later cited by European authors as Hali, Haly, or Haly Abenrudian. According to Alistair Cameron Crombie he also contributed to the theory of induction. He engaged in a celebrated polemic against another physician, Ibn Butlan of Baghdad.

== On The Qualities of a Physician ==
In "The Book of Medical Competence" he mentions the traits of the virtuous physician as the one who possesses the following seven characteristics:

1. He should be ethical, intelligent, with good vision, sane, and benevolent.

2. He should be clean and well-dressed.

3. He should treat patients' secrets as confidential, not revealing their illnesses.

4. His desire to cure patients should exceed his desire to profit from them; he should be more willing to cure the needy than the rich.

5. He should be eager to learn and help.

6. He should be pure of heart, honest, and not envious. Nothing about the wealth he has seen or the affairs of women should cross his mind.

7. He must be careful not to prescribe an untested potentially fatal medicine, or one that would cause abortion. He should cure his enemies as he would his loved ones.

== Works ==
According to Ibn Abi Usaybi'a’s History of Physicians, Ali ibn Ridwan authored over one hundred titles, including letters exchanged with other scholars, the majority of his works appear to be lost. The following list includes some of his extant works:

- A commentary on Ptolemy's Tetrabiblos survived in at least 40 Arabic manuscripts, as well as translations into Latin, Persian and Ottoman. (The pseudo-Ptolemaic Centiloquium and its commentary, which is sometimes attributed to Ali, is actually the work of Ahmad ibn Yusuf ibn al-Daya.)
- De revolutionibus nativitatum (The Revolutions of Nativities), edited by Luca Gaurico, printed in Venice (1524)
- On the Prevention of Bodily Ills in Egypt: a treatise written to refute Ibn al-Jazzar's claim that Egypt was a very unhealthy place. Ibn Ridwan also argues that air (together with other environmental aspects) was fundamental to the health of a population.
- The Book of Medical Competence where he describes the qualities of a physician and more.
