= Plato Tiburtinus =

12th-century Italian astronomer and mathematician

Plato Tiburtinus (Latin: Plato Tiburtinus, "Plato of Tivoli"; fl. 12th century) was a 12th-century Italian mathematician, astronomer and translator who lived in Barcelona from 1116 to 1138. He is best known for translating Hebrew and Arabic documents into Latin, and was apparently the first to translate information on the astrolabe (an astronomical instrument) from Arabic.

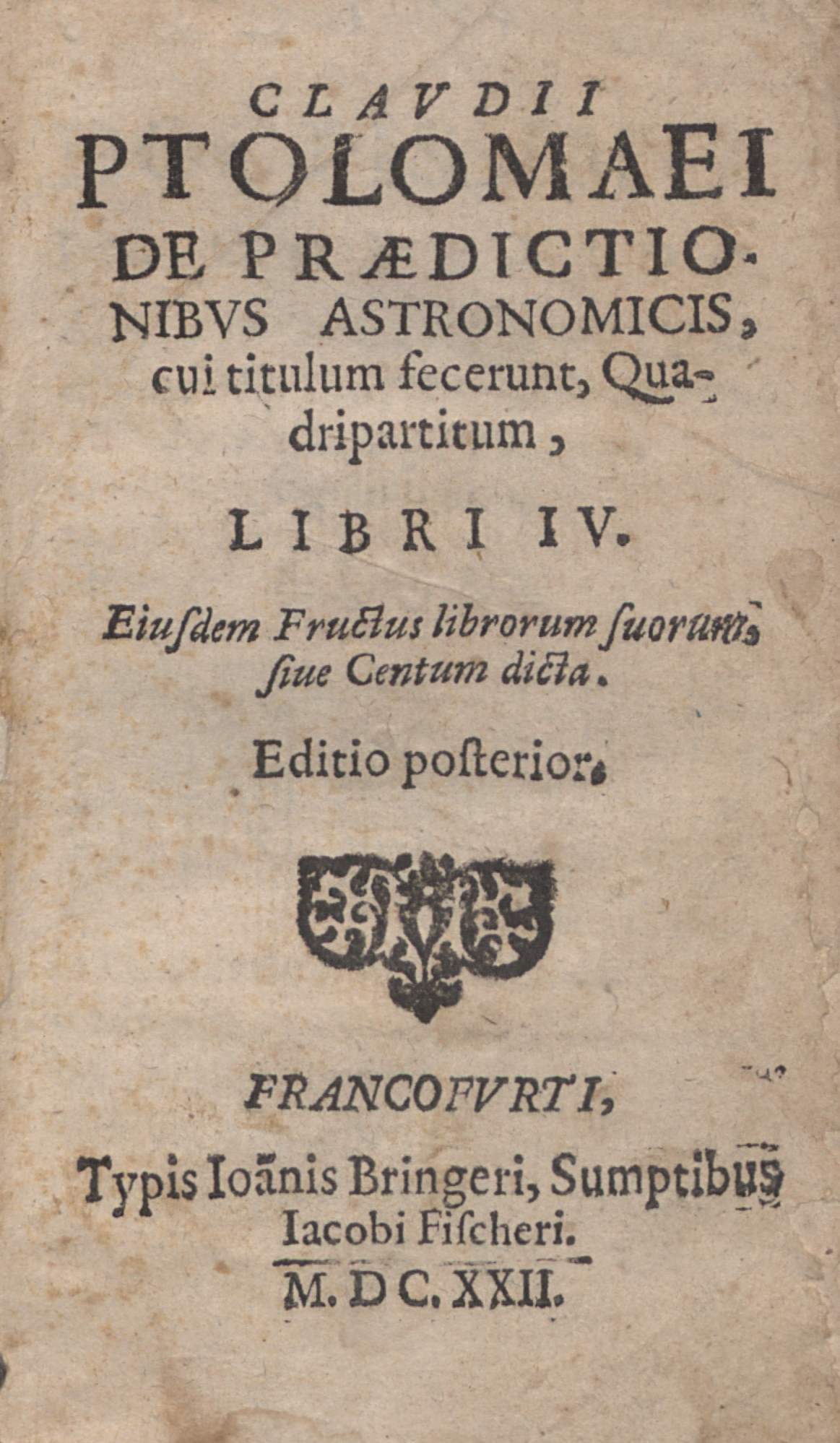
Quadripartitum, 1622

Plato of Tivoli translated the Arab astrologer Albohali's "Book of Birth" into Latin in 1136. He translated Claudius Ptolemy's Tetrabiblos from Arabic to Latin in 1138, the astronomical works of al-Battani, Theodosius' Spherics and the Liber Embadorum by Abraham bar Chiia. He has worked together with the Jewish mathematician Savasorda (Abraham Bar Ḥiyya Ha-Nasi). His manuscripts were widely circulated and were among others used by Albertus Magnus and Fibonacci.

== Works ==
To him are attributed four works in science-mathematics:

- The Liber Embadorum (“Book of Areas,” or “Practical Geometry”), it was transferred (after a date astronomical specified in the text ) in 1145 from the Hebrew. The book had an influence on the Geometry of Fibonacci book and contains one of the first comprehensive treatments of quadratic equations in the Occident.
- The Spherics by Theodosius of Bithynia,
- Al-Battān, i's al-Zij (“Astronomical Treatise”)
- The De usu astrolabii of Abu’l-Qāsim Maslama (Ibn al-Sạffār), The manuscript contains information about the first astrolabe in the West.

The translations from the Arabic of seven other works (five astrological, one geomantical, and one medical [now lost]) are ascribed to Plato:

- Ptolemy's Quadripartitum,
- The Iudicia Almansoris,
- The De electionibus horarum of Ali ibn Aḥmad al-Imrani,
- The De nativitatibus or De iudiciis nativitatum of Abu 'Ali al-Khaiyat,
- The De revolutionibus nativitatum by Abū Bakr al-Ḥasan (Albubather),
- The Questiones geomantice or Liber Arenalis scientie by “Alfakini, son of Abizarch” or “son of Abraham”,
- A De pulsibus et urinis by “Aeneas”.

== See also ==
- Latin translations of the 12th century
