= William Ramsay (astrologer) =

English physician and astrologer

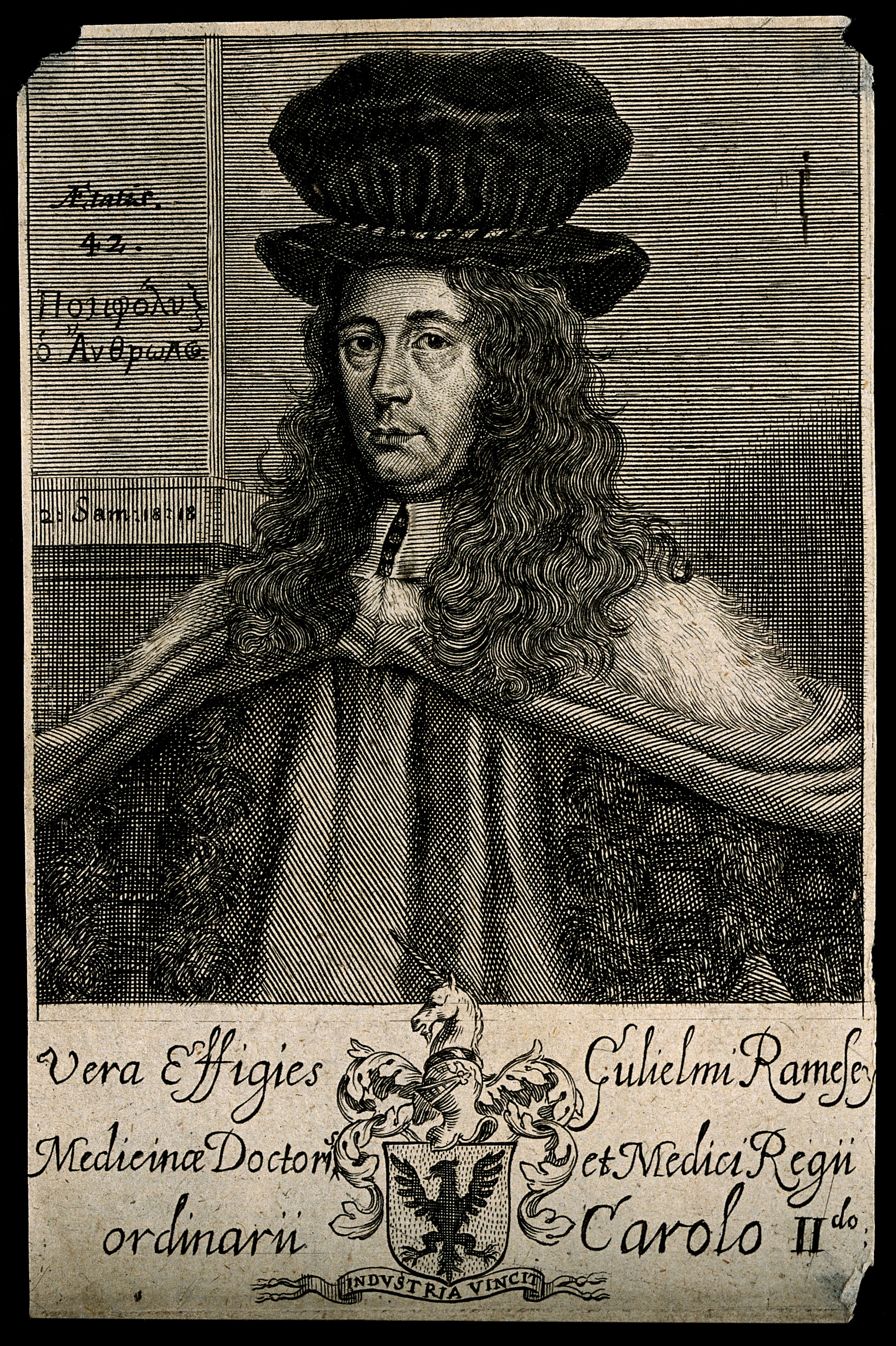
- William Ramesey. Line engraving by W. Sherwin, 1668.
- Born: 13 March 1626 or 1627; Westminster, London, England
- Died: c. 1676
- Occupations: Physician, Astrologer

William Ramsay or William Ramesey (13 March 1626 or 1627 – died c. 1676) was a Scottish-English physician and astrologer.

== Life ==
Ramsay was born at Westminster on 13 March 1626 or 1627. His father David Ramsay was the clock-maker to James I and Charles I, and was of Scottish descent. His mother was of English birth. William Ramsay spelt his name Ramesey, because he thought his ancestors came from Egypt.

After passing through several schools in and about London, Ramsay was to have gone to Oxford, but was prevented by the civil war. Accordingly he went to St. Andrews, where his studies were broken by the war; he then went to Edinburgh, was driven out by the plague, and returned to London in April 1645.

By the end of 1652 he had graduated M.D. at Montpellier, and was living with his father in Holborn. On 31 July he was admitted an extra licentiate of the London College of Physicians.

Ramsay was physician-in-ordinary to Charles II, and was living at Plymouth, when he was admitted M.D. at Cambridge by royal mandate in June 1668. His last publication is dated 1676, after which he disappears.

== Writings ==
- A reply to a scandalous pamphlet entituled A declaration against judicial astrology. 1650.
- Lux veritatis: or, Christian judicial astrology vindicated. 1651.
- Vox stellarum; or, the voice of the starres. 1651.
- Astrologia restaurate; or astrology restored. 1653.
- Man's dignity and perfection vindicated. 1661.
- De venenis; or, a discourse of poisons. 1663; 1665.
- Some physical considerations of the matter, origination, and several species of worms. 1668.
- The gentleman's companion: or a character of true nobility. 1672.
