= Franz Boll (philologist) =

German classical philologist (1867–1924)

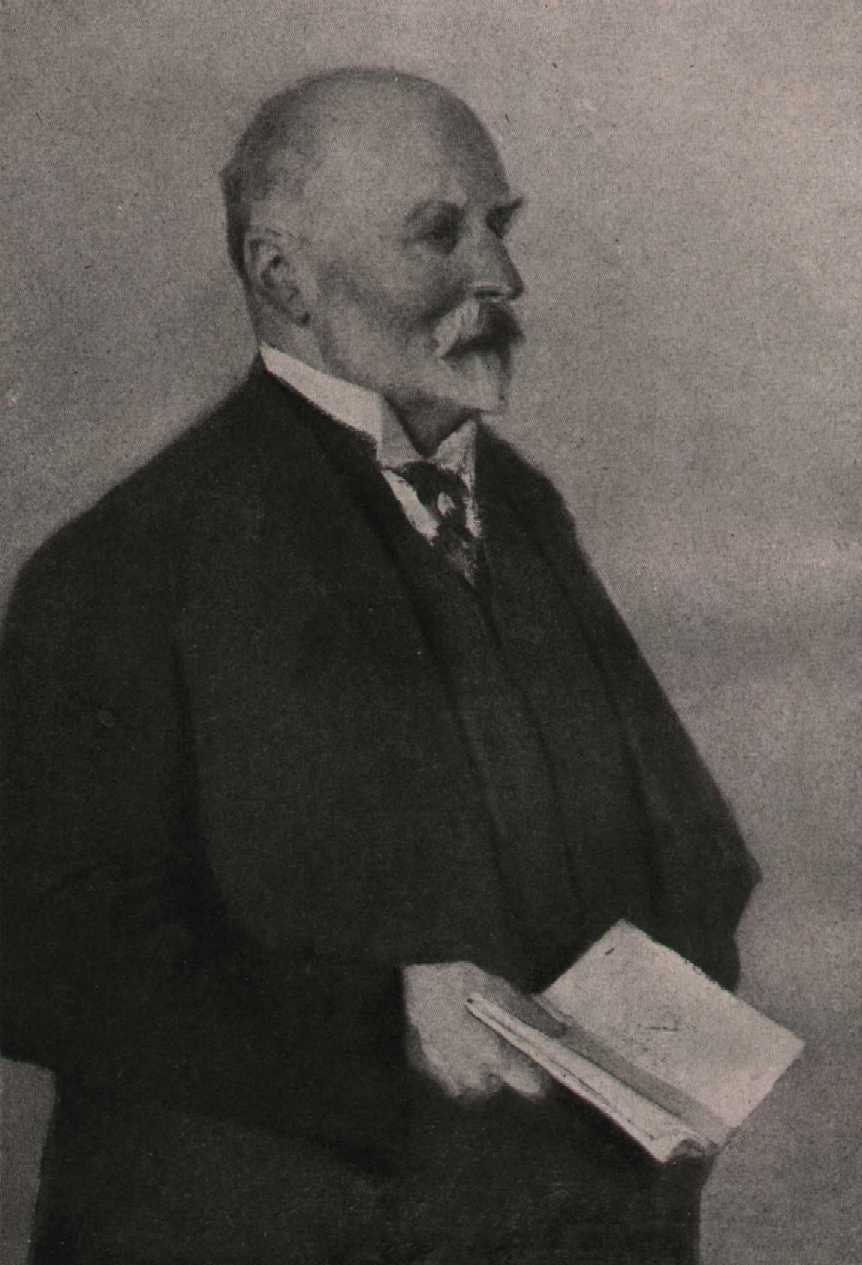
- Franz Boll
- Born: July 1, 1867; Rothenburg ob der Tauber
- Died: July 3, 1924 (aged 57); Heidelberg

Franz Boll (1 July 1867 – 3 July 1924) was a German scholar and contemporary of Franz Cumont. He became Professor of Classical Philology at the University of Heidelberg.

He is known for his editorial and biographical work on Claudius Ptolemy. He also wrote on astrology. He is quoted as saying "Astrology wants to be religion and science at the same time; that marks its essence", and "Mankind measures time using the stars. Lay people, whose knowledge is based on belief, rather than science, say: "The course of the stars determines Time," and from this, religious people drifts the saying that "Heaven guides everything on Earth." Another quote of his is "Kronos and Helios were originally one and the same"

Boll claimed that the Book of Revelation includes an allegorical depiction of the changes of astrological ages from the Age of Pisces to the Age of Aquarius, whereby the Apocalypse is the end of an aeon rather than the end of the world. He also wrote many articles on astrology, and with Gundel and Bezold produced an introduction to the history of astrology.

== Works ==
- Studien über Claudius Ptolemaeus: Ein Beitrag zur Geschichte der griechischen Philosophie und Astrologie, in: Neue Jahrbücher für Philologie und Pädagogik, Supplementband 21,2 (1894), pp. 49–244.
- Sphaera: Neue griechische Texte und Untersuchungen zur Geschichte der Sternbilder (Leipzig: Teubner, 1903) – reprinted in 1967 by Georg Olms, Hildesheim.
- Erinnerungen an Ludwig Traube, 1907
- Catalogus codicum astrologorum Graecorum: Band 7, Codices Germanicos descripsit Franciscus Boll (Brussels: Lamertin, 1908).
- [with August Kopff and Carl Bezold] Zenit- und Aequartorialgestirne am babylonischen Fixsternhimmel (1913).
- Aus der Offenbarung Johannis: Hellenistische Studien zum Weltbild der Apokalypse (Leipzig: Teubner, 1914) – reprinted in 1967 by Hakkert, Amsterdam.
- Antike Beobachtungen farbiger Sterne, (Munich: Akademie der Wissenschaften, 1916).
- [with Carl Bezold] Sternglaube und Sterndeutung: Die Geschichte und das Wesen der Astrologie (Leipzig: Teubner, 1917) – 7th ed. published in 1977 by Wissenschaftliche Buchgesellschaft, Darmstadt (also translated into Hungarian and into Italian).
- Kleine Schriften zur Sternkunde des Altertums (Leipzig: Koehler & Amelang, 1950) – edited by Viktor Stegemann.
