= List of modernist composers =

In music, modernism is an aesthetic stance underlying the period of change and development in musical language that occurred around the turn of the 20th century, a period of diverse reactions in challenging and reinterpreting older categories of music, innovations that led to new ways of organizing and approaching harmonic, melodic, sonic, and rhythmic aspects of music, and changes in aesthetic worldviews in close relation to the larger identifiable period of modernism in the arts of the time. The operative word most associated with it is "innovation". Its leading feature is a "linguistic plurality", which is to say that no one music genre ever assumed a dominant position.

Inherent within musical modernism is the conviction that music is not a static phenomenon defined by timeless truths and classical principles, but rather something which is intrinsically historical and developmental. While belief in musical progress or in the principle of innovation is not new or unique to modernism, such values are particularly important within modernist aesthetic stances.

— Edward Campbell (2010, p. 37) [emphasis added]

Examples include adherents of Arnold Schoenberg's rejection of tonality in chromatic post-tonal and twelve-tone works and Igor Stravinsky's move away from metrical rhythm.

== Australia ==
- Roy Agnew (1891–1944)
- Arthur Benjamin (1893–1960)
- Hooper Brewster-Jones (1887–1949)
- Peggy Glanville-Hicks (1912–1990)
- Percy Grainger (1882–1961)
- Margaret Sutherland (1897–1984)

== Europe ==
=== Austria ===
- Alban Berg (1885–1935)
- Ernst Krenek (1900–1991)
- Gustav Mahler (1860–1911)
- Arnold Schoenberg (1874–1951)
- Anton Webern (1883–1945)
- Alexander Zemlinsky (1871–1942)

=== Belgium ===
- Karel Goeyvaerts (1923–1993)

=== Finland ===
- Erik Bergman (1911–2006)
- Aarre Merikanto (1893–1958)

=== France ===
- Claude Debussy (1862–1918)
- André Jolivet (1905–1974)
- Olivier Messiaen (1908–1992)
- Darius Milhaud (1892–1974)
- Francis Poulenc (1899–1963)
- Maurice Ravel (1875–1937)
- Erik Satie (1866–1925)

=== Germany ===
- Paul Hindemith (1895–1963)
- Hans Pfitzner (1869–1949)
- Max Reger (1873–1916)
- Franz Schreker (1878–1934)
- Richard Strauss (1864–1949)

=== Greece ===
- Nikos Skalkottas (1904–1949)

=== Hungary ===
- Béla Bartók (1881–1945)

=== Italy ===
- Ferruccio Busoni (1866–1924)

=== Poland ===
- Karol Szymanowski (1882–1937)

=== Russia ===
- Edison Denisov (1929–1996)
- Leo Ornstein (1893–2002)
- Sergei Prokofiev (1891–1953)
- Alexander Scriabin (1872–1915)
- Igor Stravinsky (1882–1971)
- Andrei Volkonsky (1933–2008)

=== Switzerland ===
- Arthur Honegger (1892–1955)

== North America ==
=== Mexico ===
- Silvestre Revueltas (1899–1940)

=== United States ===
- George Antheil (1900–1959)
- Milton Babbitt (1916–2011)
- Elliott Carter (1908–2012)
- Henry Cowell (1897–1965)
- Ruth Crawford Seeger (1901–1953)
- Vernon Duke (1903–1969)
- Bernard Herrmann (1911–1975)
- Charles Ives (1874–1954)
- Harry Partch (1901–1974)
- Edgard Varèse (1883–1965)

== See also ==
- Modernism (music)
- Postmodernism
