= The Astrology of Personality =

Astrology book by Dane Rudhyar in 1936

The Astrology of Personality is a book by Dane Rudhyar first published in New York in 1936 by Lucis Publishing Company (Lucis Trust). It was subsequently released in 1963 in the Netherlands by Servire/Wassenaar and again with a new preface in New York in 1970 by Doubleday. The book discusses astrology from a psychological or "person-centered" perspective as opposed to the physiological and elemental perspective of many works on astrology.

Mostly recently, (2004), it has been published by Kessinger Publishing Co.
