= Ahmad ibn Yusuf =

Arab mathematician

Abu Ja'far Ahmad ibn Yusuf ibn Ibrahim ibn Tammam al-Siddiq Al-Baghdadi (Arabic: أبو جعفر أحمد بن يوسف بن ابراهيم بن تمام الصديق البغدادي; 835–912), known in the West by his Latinized name Hametus, was a Muslim Arab mathematician, like his father Yusuf ibn Ibrahim (Arabic: يوسف بن ابراهيم الصدَيق البغدادي).

== Life ==
Ahmad ibn Yusuf was born in Baghdad and moved with his father to Damascus in 839. He later moved to Cairo, but the exact date is unknown: since he was also known as al-Misri, which means the Egyptian, this probably happened at an early age. Eventually, he also died in Cairo. He probably grew up in a strongly intellectual environment: his father worked on Mathematics, Astronomy and Medicine, produced astronomical tables and was a member of a group of scholars. He achieved an important role in Egypt, which was caused by Egypt's relative independence from the Abbasid Caliph.

== Work ==
In some of the works attributed to Ahmad, it is not clear if the text came from him, his father, or whether they wrote together. It is clear, however, that he worked on a book on ratio and proportion. This was translated to Latin by Gherard of Cremona and was a commentary on Euclid's Elements. This book influenced early European mathematicians such as Fibonacci. Further, in On similar arcs, he commented on Ptolemy's Karpos (or Centiloquium); many scholars believe that ibn Yusuf was in fact the true author of that work. He also wrote a book on the astrolabe. He invented methods to solve tax problems that were later presented in Fibonacci's Liber Abaci. He was also quoted by mathematicians such as Thomas Bradwardine, Jordanus de Nemore and Luca Pacioli.

== See also ==
- List of Arab scientists and scholars

== Notes ==
- Schrader, Dorothy (1970). "Aḥmad Ibn Yūsef". Dictionary of Scientific Biography. Vol. 1. New York: Charles Scribner's Sons. pp. 82–83. ISBN 0-684-10114-9.
- H. L. L. Busard and P. S. van Koningsveld, Der "Liber de arcubus similibus" des Ahmad ibn Jusuf, Annals of science 30 (1973), 381–406.
- M Steinschneider, Yusuf ben Ibrahim und Ahmad ibn Yusuf, Bibliotheca mathematic (1888), 49–117.
