= Centiloquium =

Hundred sayings of astrology

Interlinear Greek–Latin text from a 15th-century manuscript

Start of the Arabic text

Hugo of Santalla's Latin translation of Ahmad ibn Yusuf's commentary

The Centiloquium ("one hundred sayings") is a Pseudo-Ptolemaic collection of one hundred aphorisms about astrology and astrological rules. It is first recorded at the start of the tenth century CE, when a commentary was written on it by the Egyptian mathematician Ahmad ibn Yusuf al-Misri (later sometimes confounded with his namesake Ali ibn Ridwan ibn Ali ibn Ja'far al-Misri, who lived a century later and wrote a commentary on Ptolemy's Tetrabiblos).

== Influence and authorship ==
The Centiloquium opens with a dedication to Syrus, like the classical astronomer Ptolemy's astrological treatise the Tetrabiblos ("Four books"). Ptolemy was indeed accepted as its author by medieval Arabic, Hebrew and Latin scholars, and the book was widely taken up and quoted. In Arabic it was known as the Kitab al-Thamara ("Book of the Fruit"), the name supposedly a translation of the Greek καρπος meaning "fruit", the book's aphorisms being seen as standing as the fruit or summation of the earlier treatise. It was translated at least four times into Latin, in which it was also known as the Liber Fructus, including by John of Seville in Toledo in 1136 and by Plato of Tivoli in Barcelona in 1138 (printed in Venice in 1493). In Hebrew it was translated at the same time by Tivoli's collaborator Abraham bar Hiyya, and again in 1314 by Kalonymus ben Kalonymus, as the Sefer ha-Peri ("Book of the fruit") or Sefer ha-Ilan ("Book of the tree").

Regardless of its authorship, the text has been described as "one of the most influential texts in astrology's history". It was, for example, a standard set text for medical students at the University of Bologna in the fifteenth century.

However, as even the original commentary on the book noted, the Centiloquium contains quite substantial differences in focus from the Tetrabiblos: for example, it is very concerned with "Interrogations", the asking of astrological questions about forthcoming plans and events, which is not treated at all in the earlier work. In the 1550s the Italian scholar Cardano considered this, and pronounced the work to be pseudoepigraphic – not by Ptolemy at all. This has also tended to be the view of subsequent centuries. For example, aphorism 63 discusses implications of a conjunction of Jupiter and Saturn; but this is a doctrine developed by Arabic astrologers, not known to the Greeks. The author of the book is therefore now generally referred to as Pseudo-Ptolemy.

One influential view, argued by Lemay (1978) and others, is that the original author of the work was in fact Ahmad ibn Yusuf himself, reckoning that presenting his views as a commentary on an unknown work by the great Ptolemy would make them far more influential and sought after than merely issuing such a compilation under his own name. Others however still see the Centiloquium as potentially containing a core of genuinely Hellenistic material, which may then have suffered adaptation and partial substitution in the chain of transmission and translation.
