= Mashallah ibn Athari =

8/9th century Persian Jewish astrologer and astronomer

Masha'allah ibn Athari
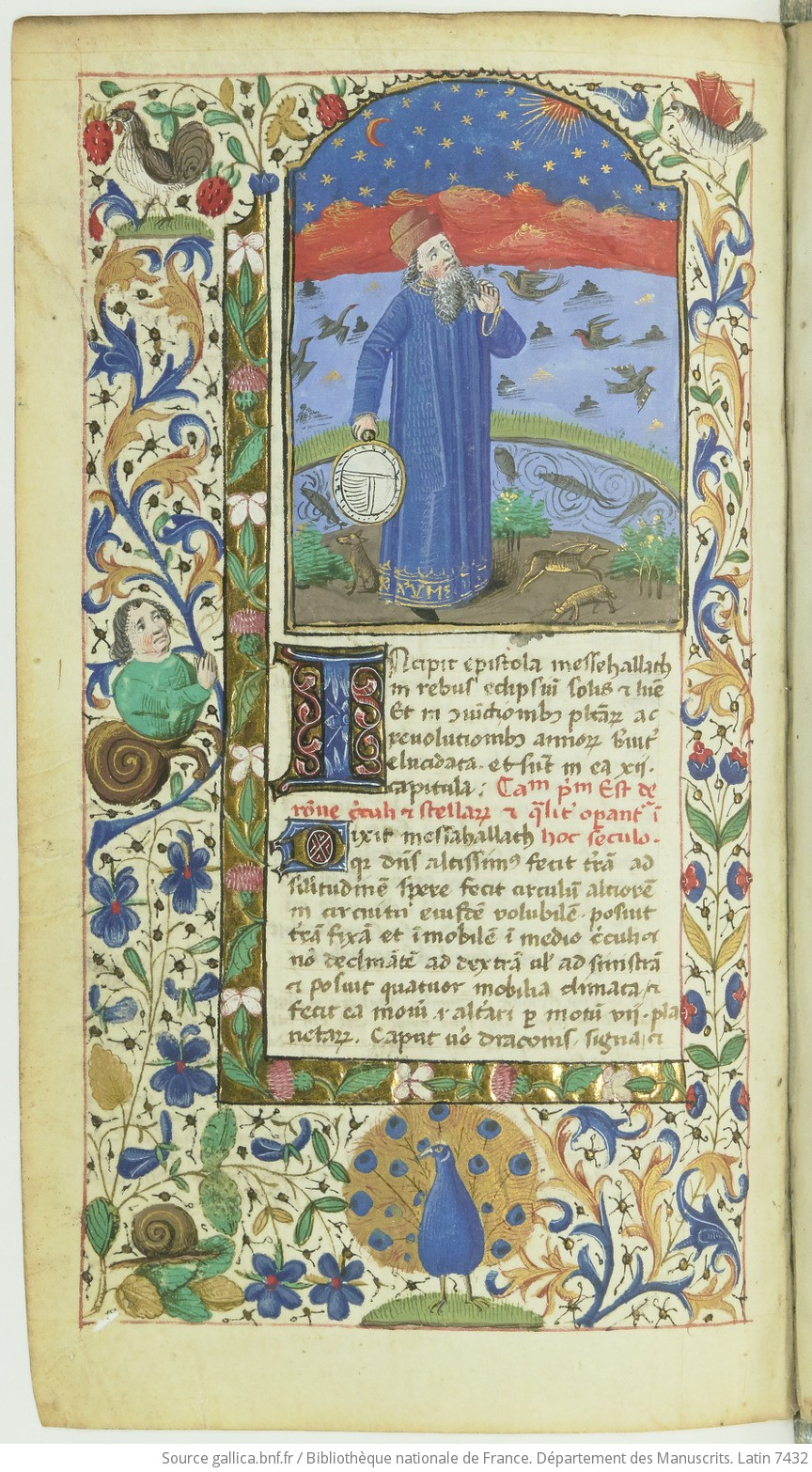
- Māshāʾallāh gazing at the sky, from the 15th-century manuscript BnF Latin 7432
- Born: 740; Basra, Abbasid Caliphate, Iraq
- Died: 815 (aged 75); Baghdad, Abbasid Caliphate
- Occupation: Astronomer

Māshāʾallāh ibn Atharī (Persian: ماشاءالله ابن اثری یهودی; c. 740 – 815), known as Mashallah, was an 8th-century Persian Jewish astrologer, astronomer, and mathematician. Originally from Khorasan, he lived in Basra (in present-day Iraq) during the reigns of the Abbasid caliphs al-Manṣūr and al-Ma’mūn, and was among those who introduced astrology and astronomy to Baghdad. The bibliographer ibn al-Nadim described Mashallah "as virtuous and in his time a leader in the science of jurisprudence, i.e. the science of judgments of the stars". Mashallah served as a court astrologer for the Abbasid caliphate and wrote works on astrology in Arabic. Some Latin translations survive.

The Arabic phrase mā shā’ Allāh indicates a believer's acceptance of God's ordainment of good or ill fortune. His name is probably an Arabic rendering of the Hebrew Shiluh. Al-Nadim writes Mashallah's name as Mīshā ("Yithru" or "Jethro"). (Note: Latin translators called him many variants such as Messahala, Messahalla, Messala, Macellama, and Macelarma, Messahalah.)

The crater Messala on the Moon is named after Mashallah.

== Biography ==
As a young man Mashallah participated in the founding of Baghdad for Caliph al-Manṣūr in 762 by working with a group of astrologers led by Naubakht the Persian to pick an electional horoscope for the founding of the city, and building of an observatory. As the attributed author of 21 works, predominantly on astrology, Mashallah's authority was established over the centuries in the Middle East, and later in the West, when horoscopic astrology was transmitted to Europe from the 12th century. His writings include both what would be recognized as traditional horary astrology, and an earlier type of astrology which casts consultation charts to divine the client's intention. The strong influence of Hermes Trismegistus and Dorotheus is evident in his work.

== Philosophy ==
Mashallah postulated a ten-orb universe, rather than the eight-orb model proposed by Aristotle, and the nine-orb version that was popular in his time. In all, Mashallah's planetary model ascribes 26 orbs to the universe, which account for the relative position and motion of the seven planets.

- Of the ten orbs, the first seven contain the planets, and the eighth contains the fixed stars.
- The ninth and tenth orbs were called the Orb of Signs and the Great Orb, respectively. Both are starless and move with the diurnal motion, but the tenth orb moves in the plane of the celestial equator, while the ninth orb moves around poles that are inclined 24° with respect to the poles of the tenth orb.
- The ninth is also divided into twelve parts, named after the zodiacal constellations seen beneath them in the eighth orb. The eighth and ninth orbs move around the same poles, but with different motions. The ninth orb moves with the daily motion, so that the 12 signs are static with respect to the equinoxes, while the eighth orb of the fixed stars moves 1° per century, so that the 12 zodiacal constellations are mobile with respect to the equinoxes. The eighth and ninth orbs moving around the same poles also guarantees that the 12 stationary signs and the 12 mobile zodiacal constellations overlap.

By describing the universe in such a manner, Mashallah was attempting to demonstrate the natural reality of the 12 signs, by stressing that the stars are located with respect to the signs, and that fundamental natural phenomena, such as the beginning of the seasons, changes of weather, and the passage of the months, take place in the sublunar domain, when the sun enters the signs of the ninth orb.

Mashallah was an advocate of the idea that the conjunctions of Saturn and Jupiter dictate the timing of important events on Earth. These conjunctions, which occur about every two decades, take place in the same triplicity for about two centuries, and special significance is attached to a shift to another triplicity.

== Works ==
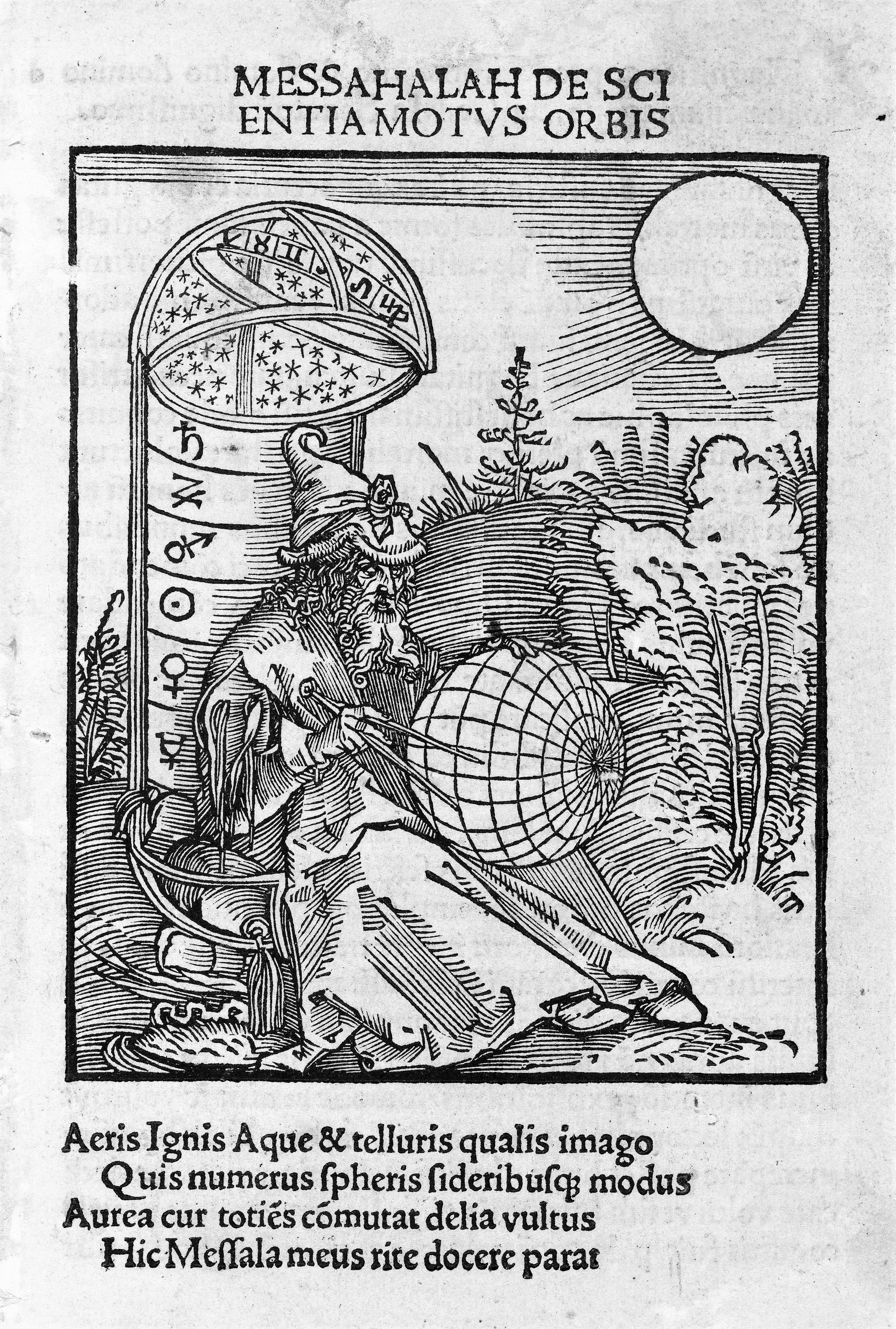
Albrecht Dürer's illustration for the title page of De scientia motus orbis (1504)

English Title	Arabic Title
The Big Book of Births (14 volumes)	كتاب المواليد الكبير
The Twenty-One On Conjunctions, Religions and Sects	الواحد والعشرين في قرانات والأديان والملل
The Projection of (Astrological) Rays	مطرح الشعاع
The Meaning	المعاني
Construction and Operation of Astrolabes	صنعة الإسطرلابات والعمل بها
The Armillary Sphere	ذات الحلق
Rains and Winds	الأمطار والرياح
The Two Arrows	السهمين
Book known as The Seventh & The Tenth: 1. The Beginning of Actions; 2. Averting What Is Predestined; 3. On Questions; 4. Testimonies of the Stars; 5. Happenings; 6. Movement and Indications of the Two Luminaries (Sun and Moon)	1. ابتداء الأعمال; 2. على دفع التدبير; 3. في المسائل; 4. شهادات الكواكب; 5. الحدوث; 6. تسيير النيرين وما يدلان عليه
The Letters	الحروف
The Sultan	السلطان
The Journey	السفر
Prices (Perceptions) (Note: Dodge notes that the Arabic word al-as’ār (الأسعار), meaning prices, should probably be rendered al-ash’ār (الأشعار), meaning perceptions.)	الأسعار
Nativities	المواليد
Revolution (Transfer) of the Years of Nativities	تحويل سني المواليد
Governments (Dynasties) and Sects	الدول والملل
Prediction (Judgement) Based on Conjunctions and Oppositions	الحكم على الاجتماعات والاستقبالات
The Sick	المرضى
Predictions (Judgements) Based on Constellations (Ṣūr)	الصور والحكم عليها

Mashallah's treatise De mercibus (On Prices) is the oldest known scientific work extant in Arabic, and the only work of his extant in its original Arabic.

One of Mashallah's most popular works in the Middle Ages was a cosmological treatise. This comprehensive account of the cosmos along Aristotelian lines, covers many topics important to early cosmology. Postulating a ten-orb universe, it strays from traditional cosmology. Mashallah aimed at the lay reader and illustrated his main ideas with comprehensible diagrams. Two versions of the manuscript were printed: a short version De scientia motus orbis (27 chapters), and an expanded version De elementis et orbibus (40 chapters). The short version was translated by Gherardo Cremonese (Gerard of Cremona). Both were printed in Nuremberg, in 1504 and 1549, respectively. This work is commonly abbreviated to De orbe.

=== Texts and translations ===
- On Conjunctions, Religions, and People was an astrological world history based on conjunctions of Jupiter and Saturn. A few fragments are extant as quotations by the Christian astrologer Ibn Hibinta.
- Liber Messahallaede revoltione liber annorum mundi, a work on revolutions, and De rebus eclipsium et de conjunctionibus planetarum in revolutionibus annorm mundi, a work on eclipses.
- Nativities, under its Arabic title Kitab al-Mawalid, has been partially translated into English from a Latin translation of the Arabic.
- On Reception is available in English from the Latin edition by Joachim Heller of Nuremberg in 1549.

Other astronomical and astrological writings are quoted by Suter and Steinschneider. The Irish Astronomical Tract appears partly based on a medieval Latin version of Mashallah, two-thirds thereof being part paraphrase, part translation. The 12th-century scholar and astrologer Abraham ibn Ezra translated two of Mashallah's astrological treatises into Hebrew: She'elot and Ḳadrut. Eleven modern translations of Mashallah's astrological treatises have been translated out of Latin into English.

=== Bibliography ===
- De cogitatione
- Epistola de rebus eclipsium et conjunctionibus planetarum (distinct from De magnis conjunctionibus by Abu Ma'shar al-Balkhi; Latin translation: John of Seville)
- De revolutionibus annorum mundi
- De significationibus planetarum in nativitate
- Liber receptioni
- Works of Sahl and Masha'allah, trans. Benjamin Dykes, Cazimi Press, Golden Valley, MN, 2008.
- Masha'Allah, On Reception, trans. Robert Hand, ARHAT Publications, Reston, VA, 1998.

=== Source for Chaucer's Treatise on the Astrolabe (1391) ===
Mashallah's treatise on the astrolabe, which was translated from Arabic into Latin as De Astrolabii Compositione et Ultilitate, is the first known of its kind. The source of Geoffrey Chaucer's Treatise on the Astrolabe (1391) in Middle English is not known, but most of his 'conclusions' can be traced to a Latin translation of Mashallah's work, Compositio et Operatio Astrolabii. Chaucer's description of the instrument expands upon Mashallah's version; that Chaucer used the treatise by Mashallah was recognised by the English scholar John Selden in 1613 and established for certain by the philologist Walter William Skeat.

While Mark Harvey Liddell held that Chaucer drew on De Sphaera of John de Sacrobosco for the substantial part of his astronomical definitions and descriptions, the non-correspondence suggests his probable source was another compilation. Skeat's Treatise of the Astrolabe includes a collotype MS facsimile of the Latin version of the second part of Mashallah's work, which parallels Chaucer's. This is also found in Robert Gunther's Chaucer and Messahala on the Astrolabe. De elementis et orbibus was included in Gregor Reisch's Margarita phylosophica (ed. pr., Freiburg, 1503; Suter says the text is included in the Basel edition of 1583). Its contents primarily deal with the construction and usage of an astrolabe.

In 1981, Paul Kunitzsch argued that the treatise on the astrolabe long attributed to Mashallah is in fact written by Ibn al-Saffar.

== See also ==
- Liber de orbe
- Astrology in medieval Islam
- Jewish views of astrology
- List of Persian scientists and scholars

== Sources ==
- Anonymous (2018) [14th century]. "An Irish Astronomical Tract". Translated by Power, Afaula. University College Cork.
- Belenkiy, Ari (2007). "Māshāʾallāh ibn Atharī (Sāriya)" (PDF). In Hockey, Thomas; et al. (eds.). Biographical Encyclopedia of Astronomers. New York: Springer Publishers.
- Durant, Will (1950). The Age of Faith: A History of Medieval Civilization – Christian, Islamic, and Judaic – from Constantine to Dante A.D. 325–1300. Vol. 4. New York: Simon and Schuster. OCLC 869431083.
- Dodge, Bayard (1970). The Fihrist of al-Nadim: a Tenth-Century Survey of Muslim Culture (PDF). Vol. 2. New York: Columbia University Press. OCLC 59215780.
- Dykes, Benjamin N., ed. (2008). Works of Sahl and Masha'allah. Translated by Dykes, Benjamin N. Cazimi Press. ISBN 978-19345-8-602-0. Archived from the original on 2009-11-14.
- Gunther, Robert Theodore (1929). Chaucer and Messahalla on the Astrolabe. Early Science in Oxford. Vol. 5. Oxford: University of Oxford. OCLC 1042928106.
- Hill, Donald R. (1994). Islamic Science and Engineering. Edinburgh, UK: Edinburgh University Press. ISBN 978-0-7486-0457-9.
- Hooper, Richard (1876). The complete works of Michael Drayton. Library of Old Authors. Soho Square, London: John Russell Smith.
- Lorch, R.P. (2013). "The Astrological History of Māshā'allāh". The British Journal for the History of Science. 6 (4). Cambridge: Cambridge University Press. doi:10.1017/s0007087400012644. S2CID 145491804.
- Kunitzsch, Paul (1989). "On the authenticity of the treatise on the composition and use of the astrolabe ascribed to Messahalla". The Arabs and the Stars. Routledge. doi:10.4324/9781315241340. ISBN 978-1-315-24134-0.
- Sela, Shlomo (2012). "Maimonides and Mashallah on the Ninth Orb of the Signs and Astrology". Historical Studies in Science and Judaism. 12 (1). Indiana University Press; Hebrew University of Jerusalem: 101–134. doi:10.2979/aleph.12.1.101. ISSN 1565-1525. S2CID 170422340.
- Selin, Helaine (1997). Encyclopaedia of the History of Science, Technology, and Medicine in Non-Western Cultures. Berlin; New York: Springer Nature. ISBN 978-1-4020-4960-6.
- Skeat, Walter William (1872). A Treatise on the Astrolabe: addressed to his son Lowys by Geoffrey Chaucer A.D. 1391. London: N. Trubner & Co. OCLC 1129737770.
- Steinschneider, Moritz (1893). Die Hebraeischen Uebersetzungen des Mittelalters und die Juden als Dolmetscher. Ein Beitrag zur Literaturgeschichte des Mittelalters, meist nach handschriftlichen Quellen. Berlin.
- Thomson, Ron B. (2022). Pseudo-Masha’allah, On the Astrolabe: A Critical Edition of the Latin Text with English Translation. Toronto: Volumes Publishing. ISBN 978-1-7782705-2-9
