= John Frawley =

John Frawley may refer to:

- John Frawley (tennis) (born 1965), retired Australian tennis player
- John Frawley (actor) (died 1999), Australian actor
- John Frawley (astrologer) (born 1955), English astrologer, writer and educator
