= Katarche =

Term in Hellenistic astrology

Katarche (καταρχή) is an ancient Greek word meaning a "beginning" or "inception."

One of the older applications of the term was within the context of religious rituals to refer to the moment when the sacrifice was first offered, or when the beginning or inception of the sacrifice took place. (See Homer, Odyssey, Chapter III.)

The main application of the term "katarche" in the Hellenistic and Roman period was to the branch of astrology now called electional astrology, or the art of choosing an auspicious time to begin a venture or an enterprise. Also included in this practice were techniques for analyzing an astrological chart drawn up for the beginning moment of an event that had already taken place, in order to foretell the likely success of a venture, or the timing of its development.

Recently, in the late 20th century, some astrologers began to extend the use of the word katarche to interrogations or horary astrology, where a chart is cast for the moment that a question is posed to an astrologer. According to this modern interpretation there is a fluid connection between the notions of electional and horary astrology. This view, which is primarily advocated by Geoffrey Cornelius, is that the origins of the concept and core meaning of the term katarche lie in the ritual, sacrificial and divinatory connotations of the term, and that the later application of the term in the Hellenistic and Roman periods strictly to elections and inceptions were a result of some sort of decay in the understanding of the term.
