= Christian Astrology =

1647 book by the English astrologer William Lilly

Christian Astrology, written in 1647 by the English astrologer William Lilly, is considered a seminal work of Western astrology. William Lilly successively treats the rules of western astrology, horary astrology and 'nativities', about erecting and analysing a birth chart in natal astrology. He wrote the book when he was ill and had to stay at home. Running away from the plague in London, he spent a year in the countryside to study, reflect, and write Christian Astrology.

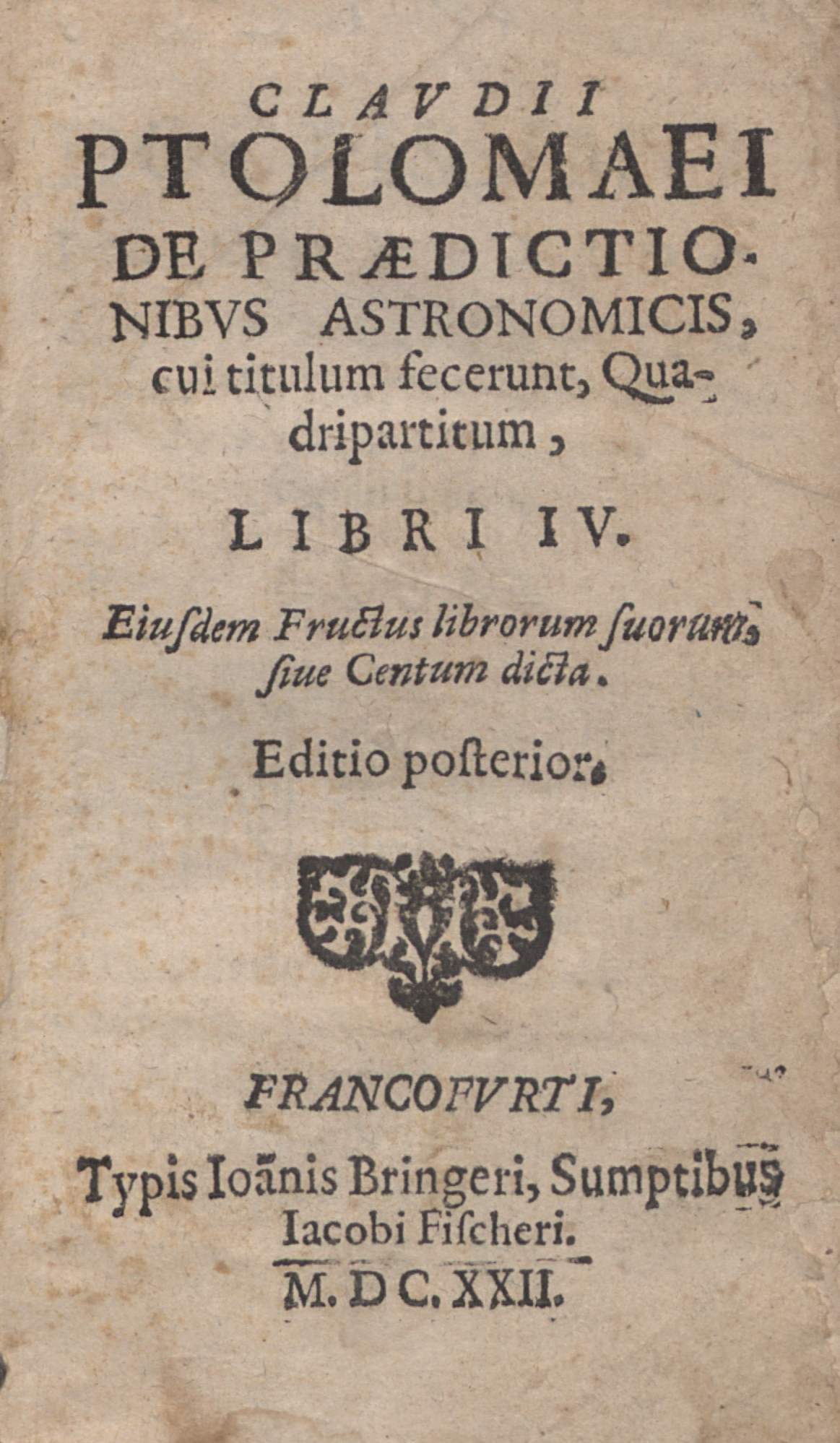
Quadripartitum, 1622

Lilly himself explains that he was influenced among others by Ptolemy's Quadripartitum (Tetrabiblos), De occulta philosophia by Agrippa, De Astronima Tractarus 10 by Guido Bonatti, 120 Aphorismi of John Dee, Medicina Catholica by Robert Fludd, Epitomes Astronomiae by Johan Kepler and Paracelsus' De Meteoris, all of which are mentioned in the appendix of Christian Astrology.

The modern edition of Christian Astrology consists of three volumes:

1. Book 1: An Introduction to Astrology
2. Book 2: The Resolution of all manners of Questions and Demands
3. Book 3: An Easie and Plaine Method How to Judge Upon Nativities

== Book 1 ==
Introduction to Astrology

Lilly referred to this book as a course for astrology students in which he expounds the general principles of astrology. Topics covered:

- The use of the ephemeris.
- Preparing the horoscope.
- The nature of the 12 signs of the zodiac.
- The nature of the planets.
- The nature of the 12 houses.

== Book 2 ==
About the solution of many questions and issues

This part of Lilly's work is a methodical instruction the student must follow to be able to answer all kinds of questions - on disease, wealth, marriage choices, travel, etc. - using the techniques of horary astrology. Lilly includes 35 examples of such questions. He gives a detailed explanation of the procedure to be followed and elaborates on all elements that are important in the analysis. The act of choosing the right "significator" is especially important, as well as choosing the right house and its ruler that are involved.

== Book 3 ==
An easy and clear method for the natal chart

In this third part, "How to judge upon Nativities" William Lilly discusses the interpretation of the natal chart.

His treatment includes the following topics:

- Determining body build, shape, color and intelligence of the unborn.
- If the person will be born rich, which diseases he will likely suffer from, and whether he will suffer a violent death, his marriage, the number of spouses, their origin, his children and what will be the most appropriate career.
- In the section on primary directions (predictions by 'advancing' the birth planets according to a formula) Lilly gives advice on the use of solar returns, transits and the signification of the aspects the planets make.

In addition, he also gives clues about how these techniques can be used to 'correct' a natal chart in case the time of birth is not exactly known to the astrologer. This he finds to be of major importance to make accurate predictions.

== See also ==
- Christian views on astrology
