= Christian views on astrology =

The early Christians, like the early Jews, were vehemently opposed to astrology, even attributing it to demonic origin.

The Church Fathers were willing to impose strong sanctions against astrology to protect their flocks. In AD 120, the noted mathematician Aquila Ponticus was excommunicated from the Church at Rome for astrological heresies.

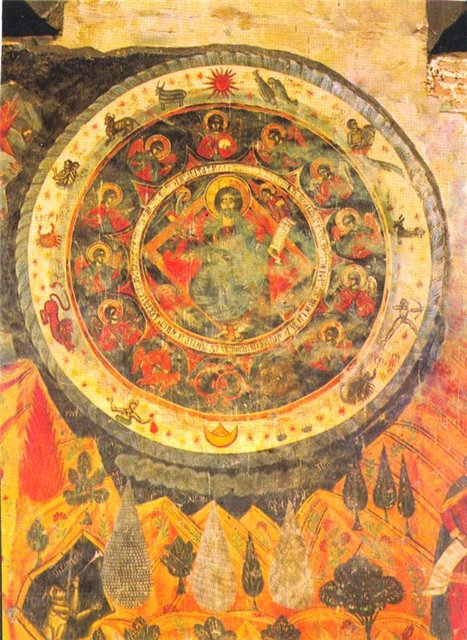
A 17th-century fresco from the Eastern Orthodox Cathedral of Living Pillar in Georgia depicting Jesus within the Zodiac circle

== Ancient ==
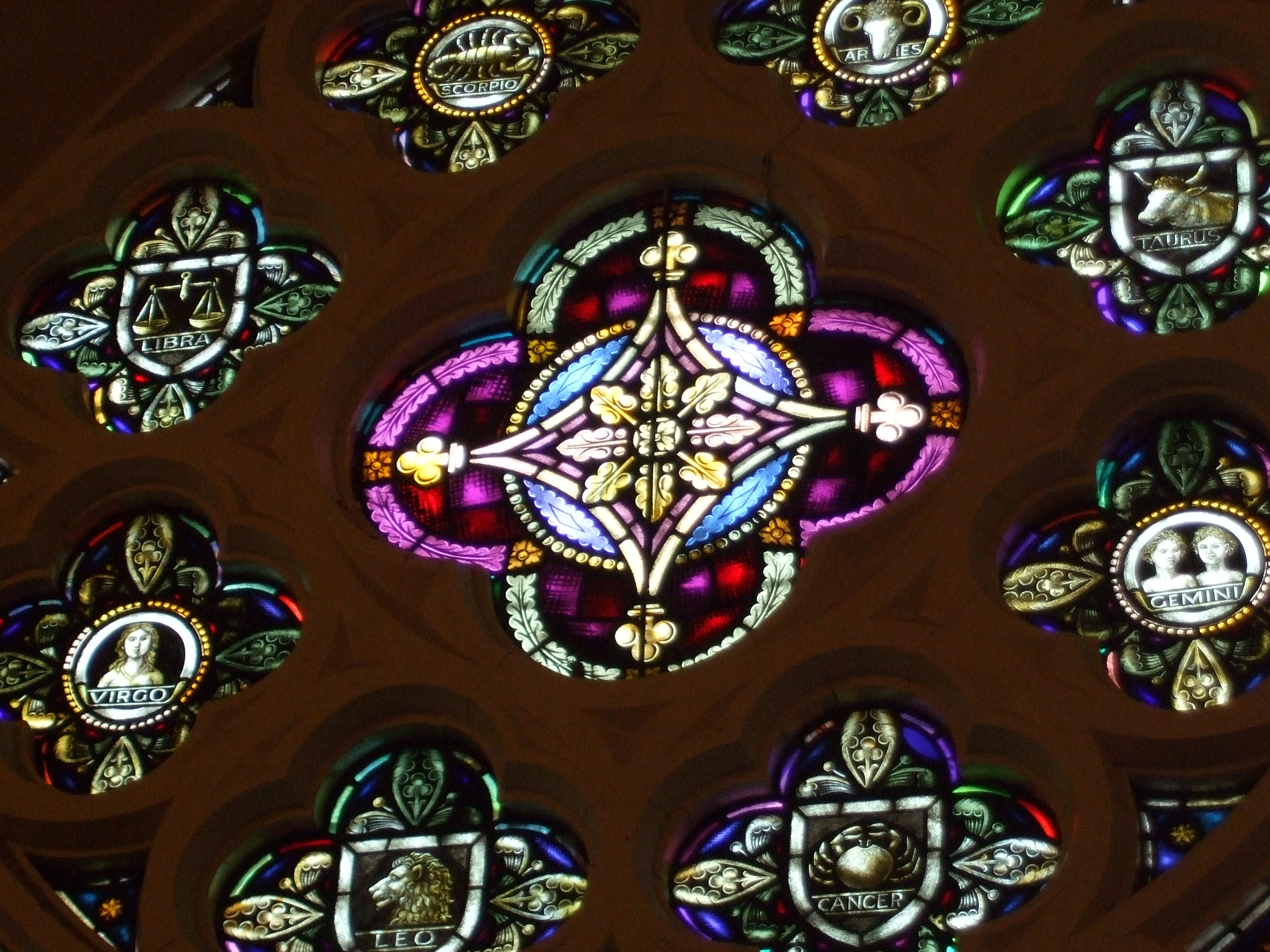
An astrological wheel located in the main stained glass window of a Presbyterian church found in Cambridge, Ontario. The church was finished in 1889. The wheel is not complete, it only contains eight of the twelve signs.

St. Augustine (354–430) believed that the determinism of astrology conflicted with the Christian doctrines of man's free will and responsibility, and God not being the cause of evil, but he also grounded his opposition philosophically, citing the failure of astrology to explain twins who behave differently although conceived at the same moment and born at approximately the same time.

== Medieval ==
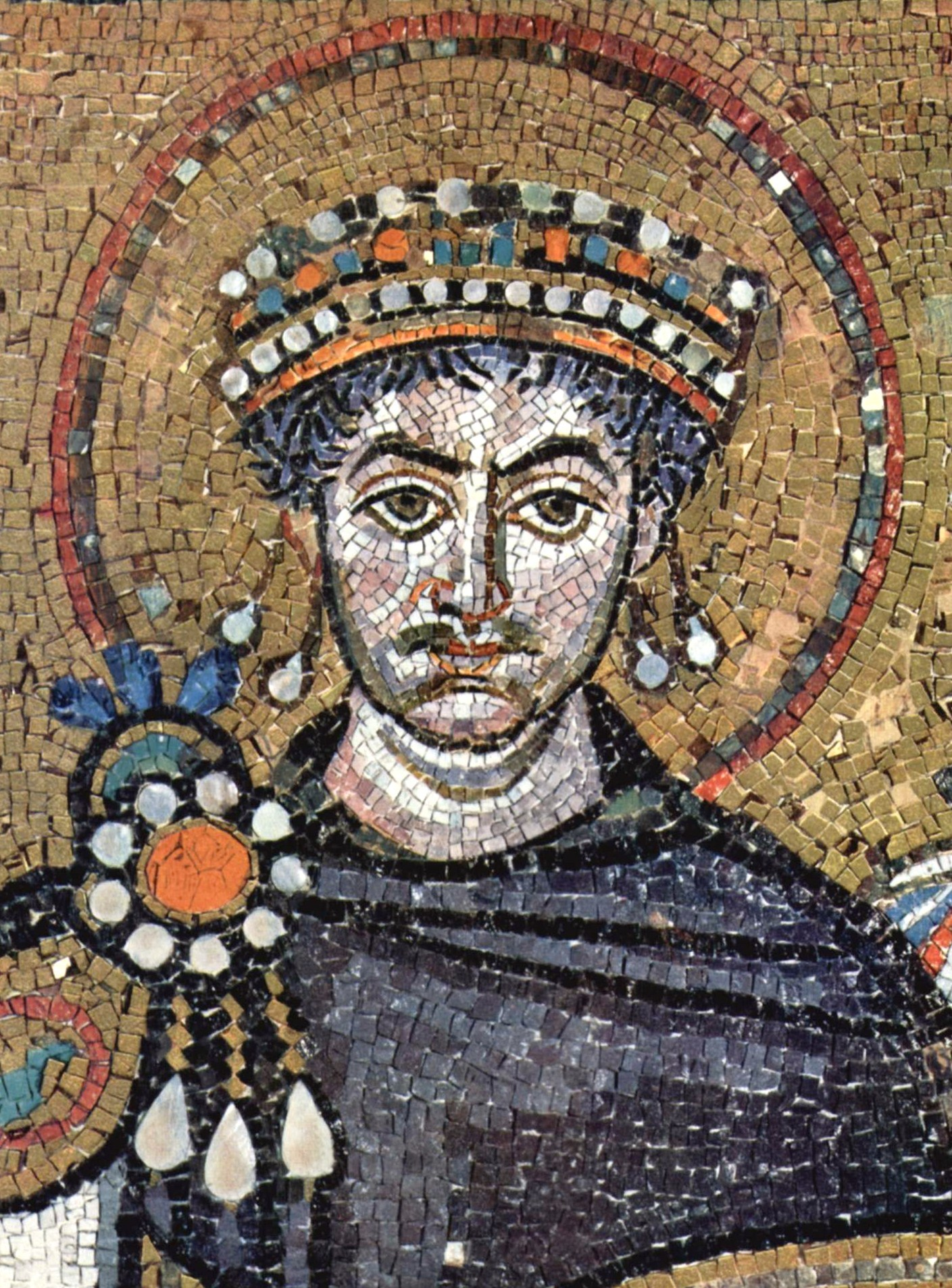
Dante Alighieri meets the Emperor Justinian in the Sphere of Mercury, in Canto 5 of the Paradiso.

The first astrological book published in Europe was the Liber Planetis et Mundi Climatibus ("Book of the Planets and Regions of the World"), which appeared between 1010 and 1027 AD, and may have been authored by Gerbert of Aurillac. Ptolemy's second century AD Tetrabiblos was translated into Latin by Plato of Tivoli in 1138. The Dominican theologian Thomas Aquinas followed Aristotle in proposing that the stars ruled the imperfect 'sublunary' body, while attempting to reconcile astrology with Christianity by stating that God ruled the soul. The thirteenth century mathematician Campanus of Novara is said to have devised a system of astrological houses that divides the prime vertical into 'houses' of equal 30° arcs, though the system was used earlier in the East. The thirteenth century astronomer Guido Bonatti wrote a textbook, the Liber Astronomicus, a copy of which King Henry VII of England owned at the end of the fifteenth century.

In Paradiso, the final part of the Divine Comedy, the Italian poet Dante Alighieri referred "in countless details" to the astrological planets, though he adapted traditional astrology to suit his Christian viewpoint, for example using astrological thinking in his prophecies of the reform of Christendom.

=== Objections ===
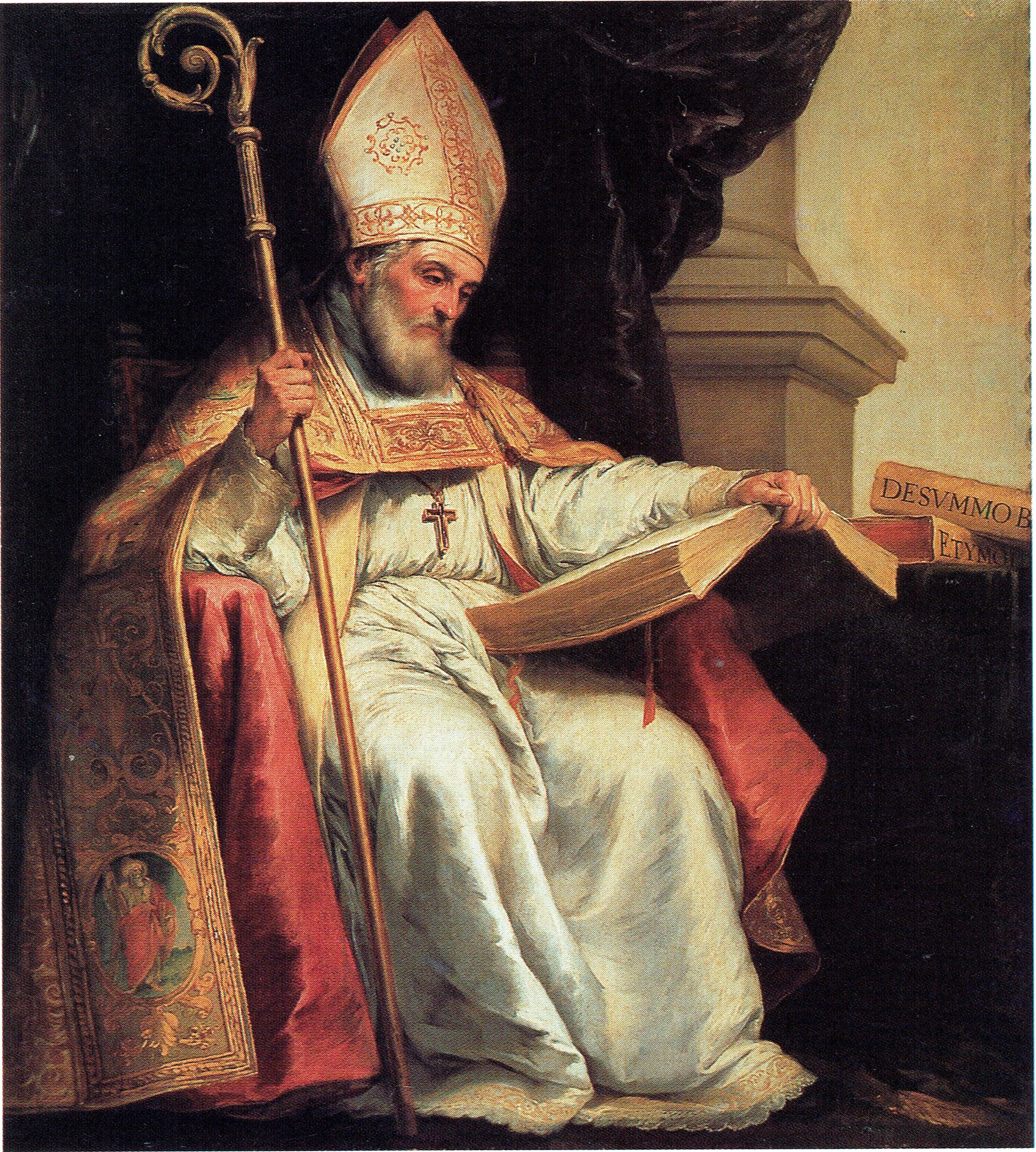
The medieval theologian Isidore of Seville criticized the predictive part of astrology.

In the seventh century, Isidore of Seville argued in his Etymologiae that astronomy described the movements of the heavens, while astrology had two parts: one was scientific, describing the movements of the sun, the moon and the stars, while the other, making predictions, was theologically erroneous. In contrast, John Gower in the fourteenth century defined astrology as essentially limited to the making of predictions. The influence of the stars was in turn divided into natural astrology, with for example effects on tides and the growth of plants, and judicial astrology, with supposedly predictable effects on people. The fourteenth century skeptic Nicole Oresme however included astronomy as a part of astrology in his Livre de divinacions. Oresme argued that current approaches to prediction of events such as plagues, wars, and weather were inappropriate, but that such prediction was a valid field of inquiry. However, he attacked the use of astrology to choose the timing of actions (so-called interrogation and election) as wholly false, and rejected the determination of human action by the stars on grounds of free will. The friar Laurens Pignon (c. 1368–1449) similarly rejected all forms of divination and determinism, including by the stars, in his 1411 Contre les Devineurs. This was in opposition to the tradition carried by the Arab astronomer Albumasar (787–886) whose Introductorium in Astronomiam and De Magnis Coniunctionibus argued the view that both individual actions and larger scale history are determined by the stars.

== Early modern period ==
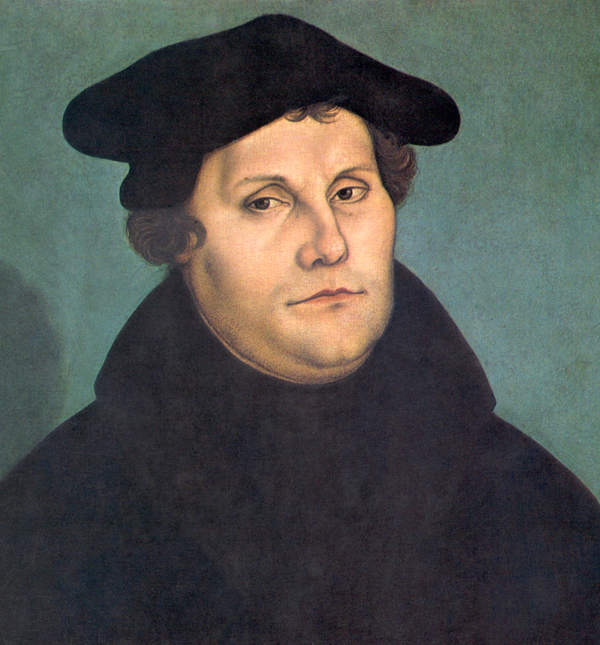
Martin Luther

Martin Luther denounced astrology in his Table Talk. He asked why twins like Esau and Jacob had two different natures yet were born at the same time. Luther also compared astrologers to those who say their dice will always land on a certain number. Although the dice may roll on the number a couple of times, the predictor is silent for all the times the dice fails to land on that number.

What is done by God, ought not to be ascribed to the stars. The upright and true Christian religion opposes and confutes all such fables.

— Martin Luther, Table Talk

Luther also went on to say:

Astrology is framed by the devil, to the end people may be scared from entering into the state of matrimony, and from every divine and human office and calling; for the star-peepers presage nothing that is good out of the planets; they affright people’s consciences, in regard of misfortunes to come, which all stand in God’s hand, and through such mischievous and unprofitable cogitations vex and torment the whole life. Great wrong is done to God’s creatures by the star-expounders. God has created and placed the stars in the firmament, to the end they might give light to the kingdoms of the earth, make people glad and joyful in the Lord, and be good signs of years and seasons. But the star-peepers feign that those creatures, of God created, darken and trouble the earth, and are hurtful; whereas all creatures of God are good, and by God created only for good, though mankind makes them evil, by abusing them. Eclipses, indeed, are monsters, and like to strange and untimely births. Lastly, to believe in the stars, or to trust thereon, or to be affrighted thereat, is idolatry, and against the first commandment.

— Martin Luther,Table Talk

=== Renaissance ===
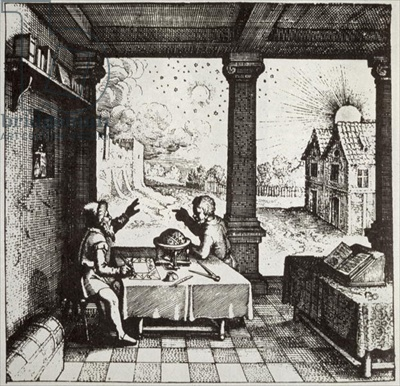
'An Astrologer Casting a Horoscope' from Robert Fludd's Utriusque Cosmi Historia, 1617

Renaissance scholars often practised astrology to pay for their research into other subjects. In England, Gerolamo Cardano cast the horoscope of King Edward VI, while John Dee was the personal astrologer to Queen Elizabeth I. Catherine de Medici paid Michael Nostradamus in 1566 to verify the prediction of the death of her husband, king Henry II of France, made by her astrologer Lucus Gauricus. Major astronomers who practised as court astrologers included Tycho Brahe in the royal court of Denmark, Johannes Kepler to the Habsburgs and Galileo Galilei to the Medici. The astronomer and spiritual astrologer Giordano Bruno was burnt at the stake for heresy in Rome in 1600.

Ephemerides with complex astrological calculations, and almanacs interpreting celestial events for use in medicine and for choosing times to plant crops, were popular in Elizabethan England. In 1597, the English mathematician and physician Thomas Hood made a set of paper instruments that used revolving overlays to help students work out relationships between fixed stars or constellations, the midheaven, and the twelve astrological houses. Hood's instruments also illustrated, for pedagogical purposes, the supposed relationships between the signs of the zodiac, the planets, and the parts of the human body adherents believed were governed by the planets and signs. While Hood's presentation was innovative, his astrological information was largely standard and was taken from Gerard Mercator's astrological disc made in 1551, or a source used by Mercator.

English astrology had reached its zenith by the 17th century. Astrologers were theorists, researchers, and social engineers, as well as providing individual advice to everyone from monarchs downwards. Among other things, astrologers could advise on the best time to take a journey or harvest a crop, diagnose and prescribe for physical or mental illnesses, and predict natural disasters. This underpinned a system in which everything—people, the world, the universe—was understood to be interconnected, and astrology co-existed happily with religion, magic and science.

== Enlightenment period ==
During the Enlightenment, belief in astrology amongst intellectuals fell away, though it had a popular following supported by almanacs. One English almanac compiler, Richard Saunders, followed the spirit of the age by printing a derisive Discourse on the Invalidity of Astrology, while in France Pierre Bayle's Dictionnaire of 1697 stated that the subject was puerile. The Anglo-Irish satirist Jonathan Swift ridiculed the Whig political astrologer John Partridge.

== Modern ==
Astrology saw a popular revival starting in the 19th century, as part of a general revival of spiritualism and, later, New Age philosophy, and through the influence of mass media such as newspaper horoscopes. Early in the 20th century the psychiatrist Carl Jung developed some concepts concerning astrology, which led to the development of psychological astrology.

The Catechism of the Catholic Church maintains that divination, including predictive astrology, is incompatible with modern Catholic beliefs such as free will:

All forms of divination are to be rejected: recourse to Satan or demons, conjuring up the dead or other practices falsely supposed to "unveil" the future. Consulting horoscopes, astrology, palm reading, interpretation of omens and lots, the phenomena of clairvoyance, and recourse to mediums all conceal a desire for power over time, history, and, in the last analysis, other human beings, as well as a wish to conciliate hidden powers. They contradict the honor, respect, and loving fear that we owe to God alone.

— Catechism of the Catholic Church

== See also ==
- Astrology and science
- Christian mysticism
- Christianity and paganism
- Esoteric Christianity
- Jesus Christ in comparative mythology

== Notes ==
- Astrologer William Lilly's book Christian Astrology (1647) is a noted work.
