= Event chart =

Horoscope of a particular event

In electional astrology, an event chart is a horoscope that is cast for the date, time and place of a particular event. Such a chart is interpreted to gain insight into influences surrounding the event and an outlook for possible developments stemming from that event.

For example, astrologers can erect a chart for a major event, such as a marriage, and interpret it as though the event were a person in its own right. For example, if a chart was cast for the date of one's marriage then the chart would give an indication of what the couple can expect during their married life. If a chart is cast for a national event then one can interpret the chart to determine influences surrounding the event. This is in contrast to a birth chart, which is calculated for the actual time of a person's birth, but the design and interpretation are similar.

== See also ==
- Composite chart, a chart that is composed of the planetary midpoints of two or more horoscopes
