= John Frawley (astrologer) =

English astrologer (born 1955)

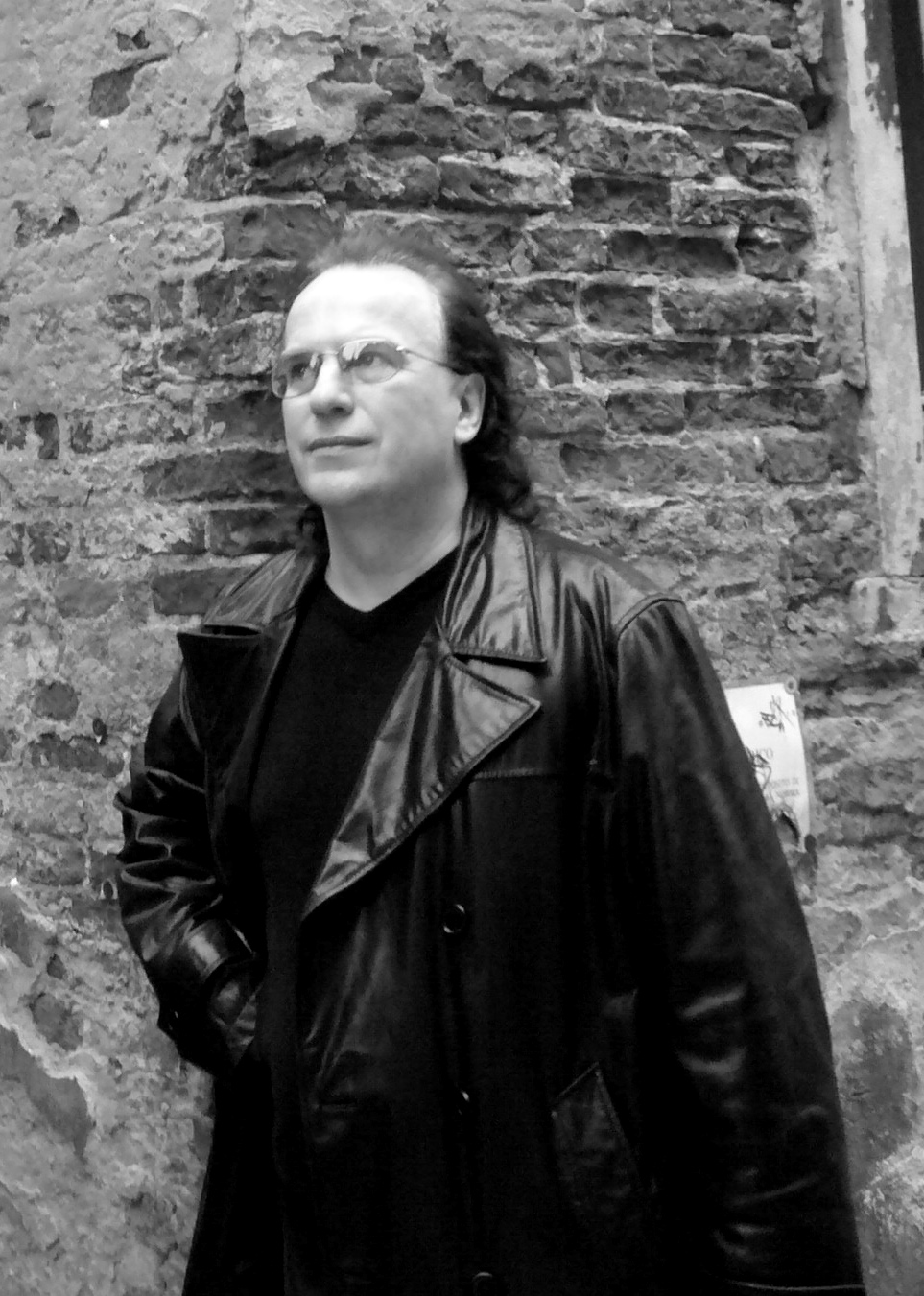
John Frawley, Astrologer

John Frawley (born 16 May 1955 in London, England) is a traditional astrologer, writer and educator, who has been noted for practicality and directness of approach, a depth of scholarship, and a provocative, challenging and witty style.

== Astrological technique and works ==
Frawley became interested in astrology at a very early age, but was repeatedly frustrated at limitations he found in the schools of modern astrology that had emerged from the thinking of 19th-century Theosophist Alan Leo.

In 1993 he encountered the work of 17th-century English astrologer William Lilly. Taking formal training from Olivia Barclay, he decided to specialise in western traditional astrology, which he perceives as having a rigorously logical approach, a capacity to deliver precise and concrete delineation, verifiable judgements and a foundation in a cosmology inseparable from a religious or spiritual faith. William Lilly has remained the greatest single influence on his work.

From 1996 to 2006, Frawley edited and produced The Astrologer's Apprentice magazine. In 2001, he launched his publishing company, Apprentice Books.

His first book, The Real Astrology, was commissioned to provide a satirical critique of modern astrology and won the Spica Award International Book of the Year in 2001.

In the book's introduction, Victor Laude criticises modern astrology for "never saying anything concrete; making only universally valid pronouncements; always flattering its audience" and for avoiding anything controversial or unpleasant. The different approaches of traditional and modern astrology are later illustrated through contrasting delineations of Adolf Hitler's birthchart by typical applications of each method.

However, Frawley also differentiates his practice from Medieval, Renaissance, or Classical branches of Astrology. He asserts that his practice is modern, but with deeper roots than those of modern astrology. The term "The Real Astrology" was coined by Frawley as a distinct term for the modern-day practice and application of traditional astrological methods.

The Real Astrology was described in the Astrological Association Journal as "a must for all serious astrologers". It was followed by several further published works. All titles have been translated into several languages.

In the late 1990s, Frawley regularly appeared on British television, including hosting his own daily program Frawley and the Fish on L!VE TV. He featured in Odds on Sport, Predictions! and a number of other British television shows, where he accurately predicted outcomes for high-profile sports contests.

Frawley runs his own diploma courses in traditional horary and traditional natal astrology. He has speaking and lecturing engagements around the world, some of which have been recorded and distributed on compact disc.

== Bibliography ==
- The Astrologer’s Apprentice, 1996–2006. Apprentice Books, London.
- The Real Astrology, 2001. Apprentice Books, London. ASIN B00IBOTKBC
- The Real Astrology Applied, 2002. Apprentice Books, London. ASIN B00AA9NO5O
- The Horary Textbook, 2005. Apprentice Books, London. ISBN 978-0953977499
- Sports Astrology, 2007. Apprentice Books, London. ISBN 978-0953977420
- The 4th Real Astrology Intensive on Natal Astrology, June 2010. CD set produced by Entity, London.
- The 4th Real Astrology Conference, June 2010. CD set produced by Entity, London.
