= Ranna an aeir =

Medieval Irish astronomical tract

Ranna an aeir ("The Constellations") is the title of a medieval Irish astronomical tract, thought to date from c.1500–1550? It was written in Early Modern Irish, with some words in English and Latin.

== See also ==
- An Irish Astronomical Tract
