= Olivia Barclay =

English astrologer

- Born: 12 December 1919; Essex, England
- Died: 1 April 2001 (aged 81)
- Occupation: Astrologer
- Awards: Professional Astrologers Inc. Award from the APAE

Olivia Barclay (12 December 1919 – 1 April 2001) was a British astrologer who played an important role in the revival of traditional forms of astrology in the late 20th century. Much of her focus in the latter part of her life was on the work of the 17th-century astrologer William Lilly.

== Biography ==
In 1980, Barclay obtained an original copy of Lilly's Christian Astrology, and later she arranged to have it re-printed as a facsimile edition in 1985. This dissemination of Christian Astrology helped to spur a revival of interest in traditional astrology in the late 20th century. Her work stimulated the unearthing of techniques that had been lost in various cultural transitions since the Enlightenment and encouraged wider researches into the astrological traditions of the Babylonians, Greeks, Egyptians, Persians, Arabs, Western medieval and Renaissance practitioners.

As part of her work as a professional astrologer, Barclay taught horary astrology, and she founded the Qualified Horary Practitioner ("QHP") correspondence course. This consisted of twelve lessons, the last of which required students to make a successful prediction using horary astrology. Several graduates of her course went on to make prominent careers for themselves in the field.

Barclay wrote Horary Astrology Rediscovered (published in 1990), which is a detailed description of the theory, practice and history of horary astrology. The book included material from her correspondence course and in 1991 received the Professional Astrologers Inc. Award for her 'outstanding contribution to astrology'. According to James Holden, in her book, she "advocates the use of Regiomontanus houses, apparently reasoning that if they were good enough for Lilly, they are good enough for 20th century horary astrologers."

Barclay's advocacy of Lilly also brought about an elevation of horary astrology (which is the main focus of Christian Astrology) from obscure occultism to mainstream astrological practice.

== Publications ==
Olivia Barclay, Horary Astrology Rediscovered, Whitford Press, 1997. ISBN 0-914918-99-0

== Sources ==
- Nicholas Campion, "The Traditional Revival in Modern Astrology: A Preliminary History," Astrology Quarterly, Volume 74, No. 1, Winter 2003, pgs. 28–38.
