= Liber de orbe =

Astrological book of medieval Islam

Liber de orbe was a Latin translation made in 1130s CE of an Arabic work attributed to the 8th century astrologer Mashallah ibn Athari.

The work's main topic is cosmology and is considered one of the earliest works on Aristotelian physics available in Latin.

== See also ==
- Astrology in medieval Islam
