= Irish Astronomical Tract =

The Irish Astronomical Tract is an Irish text that was created in the first half of the 14th century. It was written in Early Modern Irish and is based on a Latin translation of an Arabic work De Scientia Motus Orbis by Masha'allah ibn Atharī (c.740–815 AD). Of its 40 chapters, 27 correspond to chapters in Masha'allah's work and the rest to various classical authors.

The name of its author and place of composition is unknown, but it is dated by its reference to the use of spectacles.

== See also ==
- Ranna an aeir

== Manuscripts ==
- Stowe, B II 1; Royal Irish Academy, Dublin. Electronically available, with cataloguing information, on the ISOS Project (http://www.isos.dcu.ie).
- Z 2. 2. 1. (olim V. 3. 1. 38); Marsh's Library, Dublin.
- 23 F 13; Royal Irish Academy, Dublin.
- British Library L 3. B. 32 (transcript of 'De Scientia Motus Orbis').

== Editions ==
- J. J. O'Farrelly, Irish Cosmographical Tract: Transcription of the Irish Text with contractions retained [From Stowe B II 1]. Unpublished handwritten manuscript, MS 3A7, 852, Royal Irish Academy Library, 1893.
- J. J. O'Farrelly, Irish Cosmographical Tract Transcription of the Irish Text, with contractions in Irish extended with reference to Marsh copy and to RIA copy 2. Unpublished handwritten manuscript, MS 3A10, 855, Royal Irish Academy Library, 1893.
- J. E. Gore, 'An Irish Astronomical Tract', in: 'Knowledge & Scientific News'; February, 1909.
- Maura Power, Chapters 8, 39, and a portion of chapter 9, with another small fragment of the text, were published with the same English translation of the 1914 edition in Celtia, a pan-Celtic monthly magazine, 11 (London, The Celtic Association) 54–6; 90–92; 101–03.
- Tomás Ó Concheanainn, The Scribe of the Irish Astronomical Tract in the Royal Irish Academy, B II 1, Celtica 11 (1976) 158–67.
- Bartholomei Anglici, De proprietatibus rerum liber octavus, Leagan Gaeilge ó thús na 15ú aoise. Ed. by Gearóid Mac Niocaill, Celtica 8 (1968) 201–42; 9 (1971) 266–315.
- An Irish Corpus Astronomiae (being Manus O'Donnell's seventeenth century version of the Lunario of Geronymo Cortès), ed. by F. W. O'Connell and R. M. Henry, London 1915.
- John A. Williams, The Irish Astronomical Tract: a case study of scientific terminology in 14th century Irish, M.Phil. Thesis, University of Sydney, 2002. Contains a revised translation. Electronically available at: http://hdl.handle.net/2123/515
