= Latin 7432 =

Astronomical manuscript

BNF Latin 7432
- Bibliothèque nationale de France
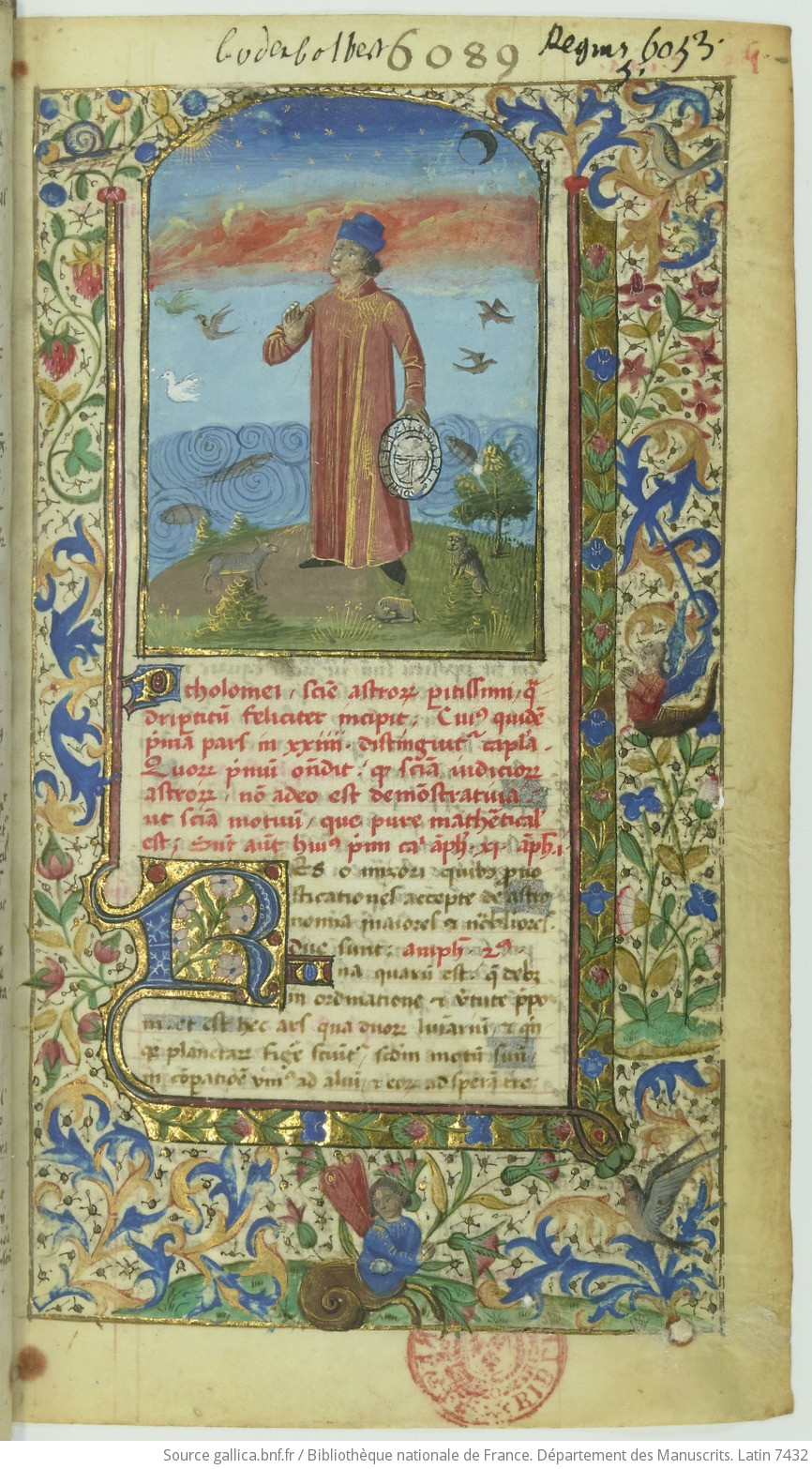
- Fifth Folio representing Ptolemy
- Type: Présentation Manuscript
- Date: Between 1468 and 1488
- Place of origin: Belleperche Castle (Allier, France)
- Language(s): Latin, Greek marginal
- Author(s): Ptolemy, Mashallah, Pseudo-ptolemy...
- Compiled by: Conrad Heingartner
- Patron: John II, Duke of Bourbon
- Size: 275 folios
- Format: 125 × 205 mm

Latin 7432 (former shelfmarks Colbert 6089) is a medieval astronomical manuscript preserved as a part of the Latin collection in Bibliothèque nationale de France. This is an outstanding example of a presentation manuscript. It was produced under the supervision of Swiss astrologer and physician Conrad Heingarter for his patron Jean II, Duke of Bourbon in the second half of the 15th century. The content of this manuscript mainly concerns astrology and astronomy. It includes major texts on the astrological subject such as Ptolemy's Quadripartitum, Pseudo-Ptolemy Centiloquium and the works of Mashallah ibn Athari. It also contains Parisian Alfonsine tables complemented by the respective canons composed by John of Saxony. This manuscript is highly illuminated and contains a large number of decorative miniatures and technical diagrams.

== History ==
The translation of the Alphonsine table gave Europe a common language to talk about astronomy and led to a new interest in the field. As masters of the movement of planets, astronomers had the role of setting the time and determining key dates during the year. Moreover, many famous astronomers of the time, like Heingarter, earned their living by serving at courts, by calculating horoscopes and giving medical advice to the aristocracy. This is not surprising as during the Middle Ages astrology was considered an official astronomical discipline.

This manuscript is written for the most part by the hand of Conrad Heingarter (before 1440 – after 1504), who was a physician and an astronomer of Swiss origin affiliated with the University of Paris. He served as an astrologer at the court of John II, Duke of Bourbon, and his wife Joan of France (The sister of Louis XI, King of France), to whom Heingarter has dedicated several treatises on the subject of health and astrology. He was likewise in the service of Louis XI himself and his heir Charles VIII.

BnF 7432 was produced under Heingarter's supervision as a Presentation manuscript for his patron, in his castle Belleperche in Allier. The manuscript contains direct dedications to the Duke of Bourbon on numerous folios, for instance, on folios 223r–v: "Stelle verificate ad eram Iohannis Borboni ducis et ad orizontem Bellepertice". Unlike BnF 7295A and BnF 7197, copied by Heingarter himself, BnF 7432 was produced by a different scribe, apart from the marginal commentary and on folio 3v-151r and a loose leaf between folios 226v and 227r (inside John of Saxony's canons) with a brief note that is written in Heingarter's hand.

== Presentation manuscript ==
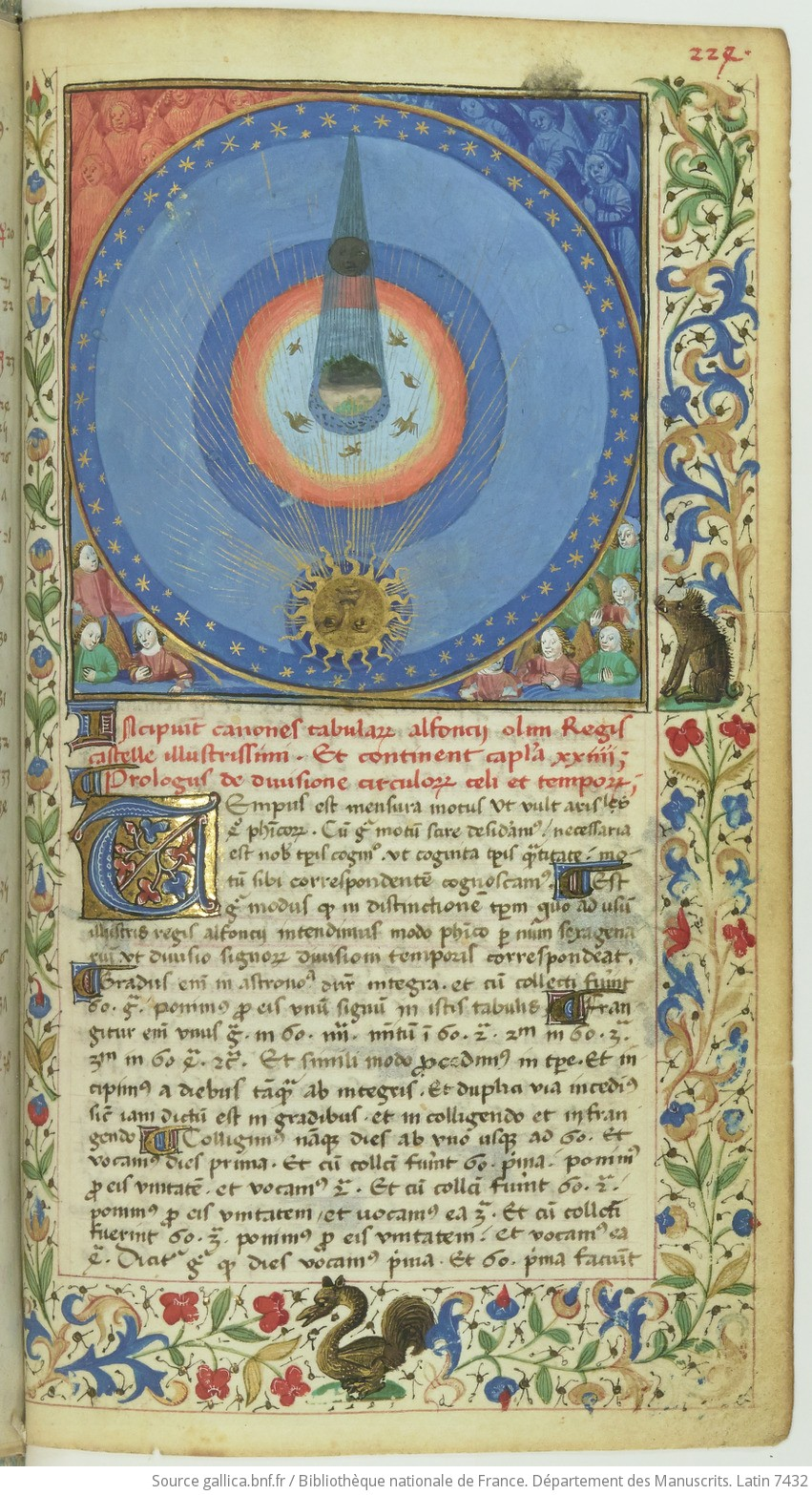
An astronomical diagram representing a lunar eclipse

Presentation manuscripts are usually made in specialised scriptoria and involve various professionals in their production: copyists, illumination artists, miniaturists and a dozen other specialized tasks. The main goal of such codices is to present the state of the art in a field rather than be of practical use, often to popularise the topic to a patron. For that reason, manuscripts of this type are usually highly decorated and neatly copied, adding to their patrimonial value not only for the history of science but also for the fields of art history, palaeography and manuscript conservation. Some Presentation manuscripts have been produced at the royal courts, however, BnF 7432 is a manuscript produced by a famous astrologer in honour of his patron, as a symbolic gratitude for protection. The aim behind the production of BnF 7432 was to demonstrate Conrad Heingarter's vast fundamental knowledge in astrology and his mastery of the practical disciplines underlying it, such as astrological computation, mathematical astronomy, meteorology and medicine. However, despite numerous dedications to the Duke of Bourbon, BnF 7432 also contains many references to the students (such as on folios 3v, 102v, 125v-126r). This led some to speculate that the addressee of this manuscript had changed while its production was still in progress. Concerning the intellectual content, BnF 7432 is a sum of numerous manuscripts, the first half of which is focused on the works of Ptolemy: an astrological treatise Quadripartitum and Pseudo-Ptolemy's Centiloquium and De cometis. It also contains the Arabic text of Messahalah's Epistolae de rebus eclypsium. And some smaller texts on the astrological subject such as Astronomia Ypocratis representing the field of medical astrology. Some major works of the Alfonsine corpus are also present in BnF 7432, such as John of Saxony's canons to the Alfonsine tables or Teorica planetarum Gerardi. A unique feature of this manuscript is the presence of Haingarter's original commentary on Ptolemy's Quadripartitum and Centiloquium. The Greek alphabet and prayer that are found at the end of the codex (folios 55r-275v) is another possible trace of Heingarter's, as notes in Greek can be found in some of his other manuscripts.

== Marginal commentaries ==
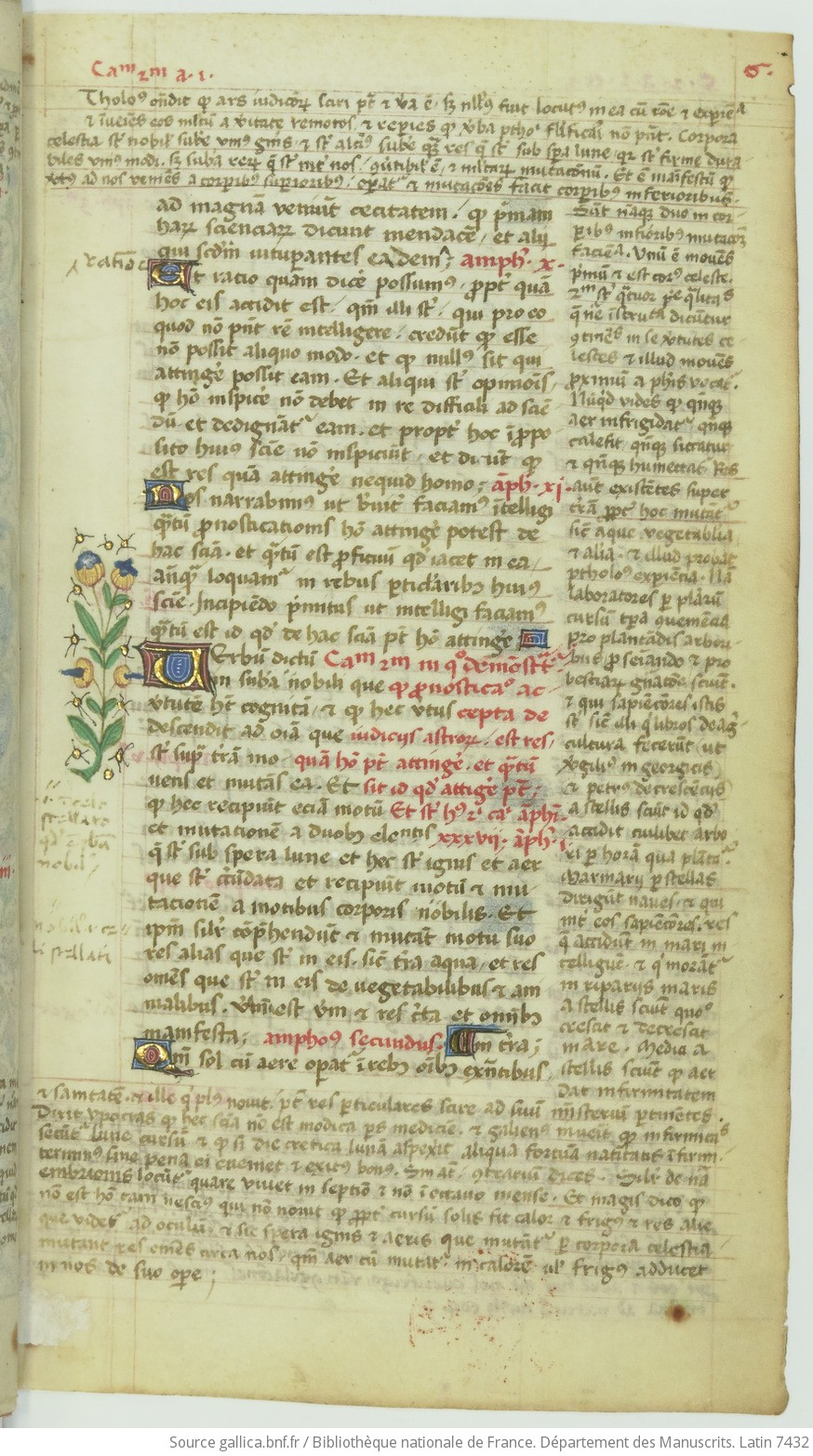
Page of Bnf 7432 with Heingartner commentary

One of the specificities of BnF 7432 is its marginal notes. Unlike most manuscripts, where margins give space to rather brief point annotations or corrections, BnF 7432 shows full treatises written entirely in its marginal space. Those are commentaries on Ptolemey's Quadripartitum and Centiloquium, at least partly composed by Heingarter.

The layout is organized in a two-level way: the main text in a more formal book hand in the centre of the page and the text of Heingarter's commentaries on the margins. Commentum Quadripartiti Ptolomei is found on folios 3v-134r. This text is a re-elaboration of Quadripartitum combined with the commentary by Ali ibn Ridwan (translated into Latin by Aegidius de Tebaldis). The level of Heingarter's originality in this work is yet unclear, however, the preface to Jean II of Bourbon (fol. 3v-4r), a conclusion at the end of Book IV (103r) and certain corrections of Haly Abenrudian's commentary are certainly of his authorship. An almost identical text, including Heingarter's preface, is likewise found in the manuscript BnF Latin 7305, with the difference that BnF 7432 lacks Plato of Tivoli's translation of the Quadripartitum, which is present in BnF 7305. Folios 134v-151r contain a similar commentary on the Centiloquium in Plato of Tivoli's translation. This also includes a commentary on Pseudo-Ptolemy's treatise De cometis. As for the Quadripartitum, the amount of Heingarter's contribution to the composition of this text remains unknown.

== Alfonsine tables ==
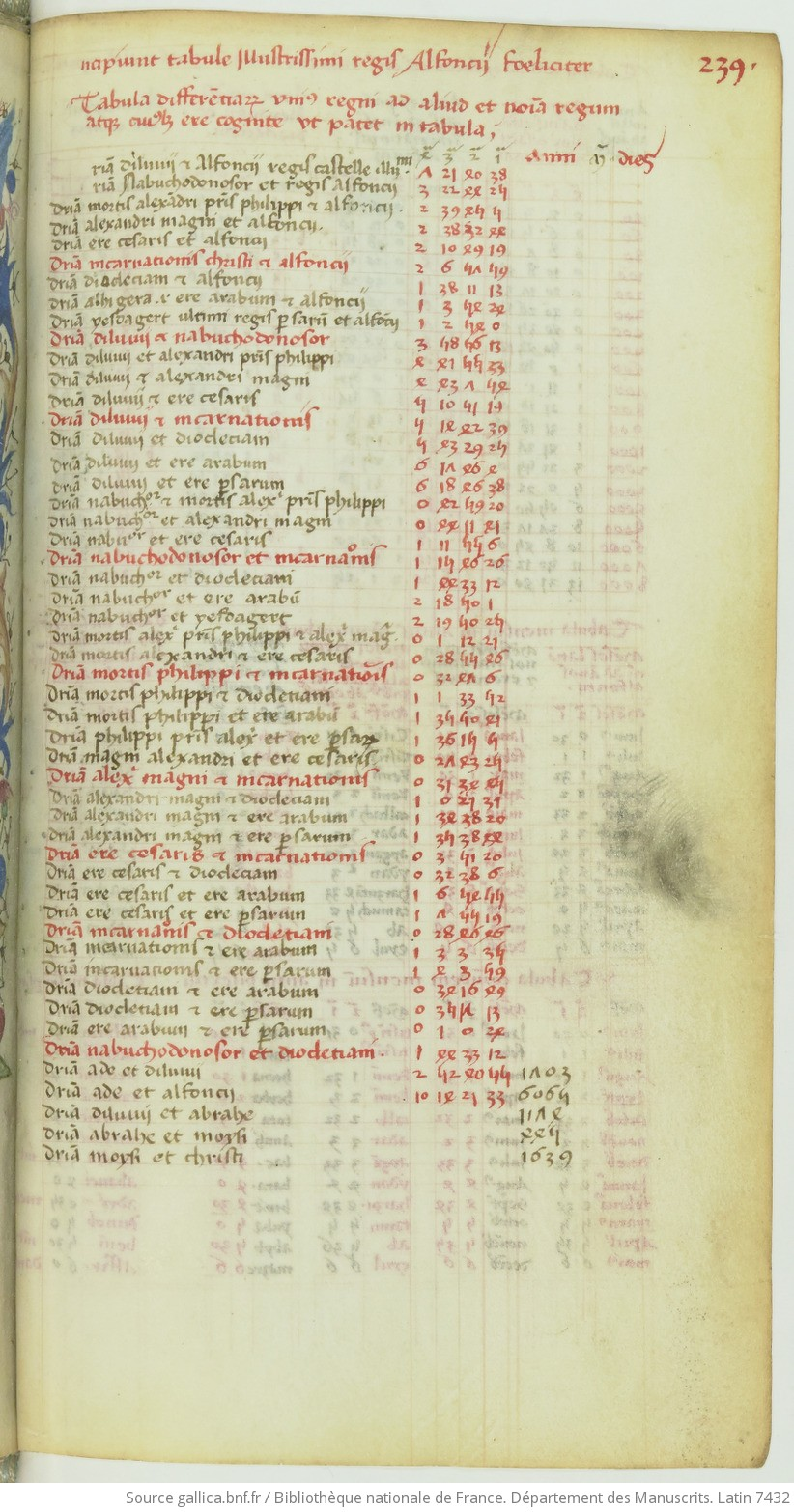
Alfonsine Tables

Even though BnF 7432 is not specifically aimed for practical use in calculations (like Toolbox manuscripts), it does contain a set of tables that are mainly gathered in the end of the codex, on folios 239r-263v.

Folios from 239r to 258v contain a version of the Alfonsine tables, which are aligned with John's of Saxony's Canons of 1327 that are found on folios 224r-236v. In the case of BnF 7432 the canons perfectly coincide with the following tables, while in the astronomical manuscripts production tradition text and tables found within one codex don't always complement each other.

The canons by John of Saxony, alongside Theorica planetarum Gerardi and the Alfonsine tables form a section of mathematical astronomy in the manuscript that is mostly astrology-oriented. Then, a set of astrological tables is found on folios 259-263v, after a treatise on the respective subject. Other tables found in BnF 7432 are on the subject of astrology, geography, star tables, tables for the motion of the eighth sphere, radices, mean motion, trigonometrical tables (for finding right and oblique ascension), syzygies computation and latitude tables. Some of the tables are incomplete or empty, which means that the layout of the manuscript was planned before the copying of its content.

== Illustrations ==
As BnF 7432 is produced mainly for presentation purposes, its visual layer is highly pronounced. Apart from its neat palaeography and peculiar layout, BnF 7432 contains a large number of illustrations that could be divided into three types. The illustrations of the first type are of purely decorative purpose (such as on folio 5r). They usually open a chapter and are thematically related to the discussed subject, and point out some aspects of the astronomical science (such as the relation between astrology and medicine or the importance of astrology to courtly activities and the king's duties), but carry few to no technical knowledge. Marginal decoration and illuminated initials can also be placed in this category.

Apart from the decorative illustrations, many technical diagrams are found in BnF 7432. They are not illuminated and serve particularly for the explanation of the intellectual content, for instance, planetary astronomy in Teorica planetarum Gerardi (fol. 209v).

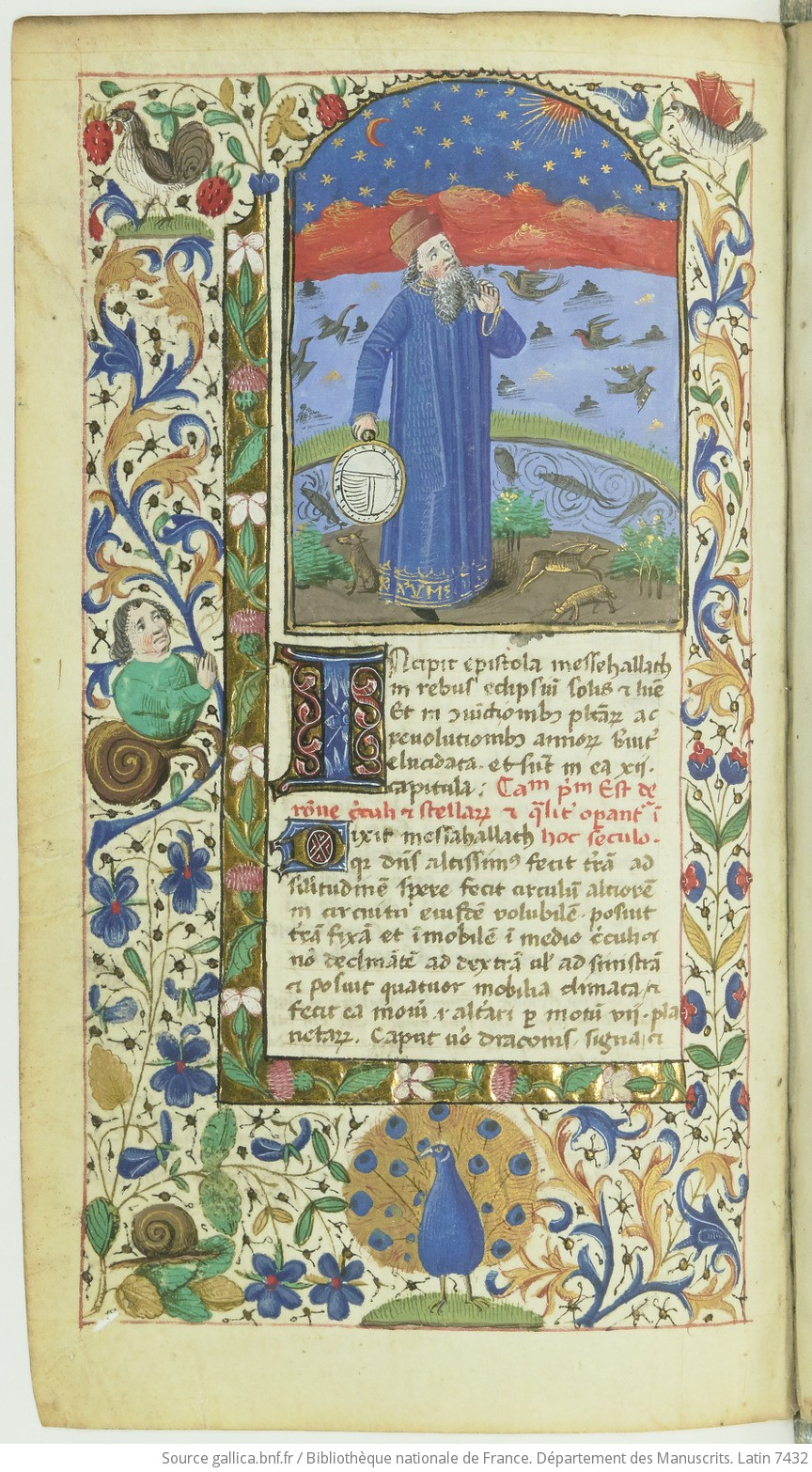
Mashallah gazing at the sky

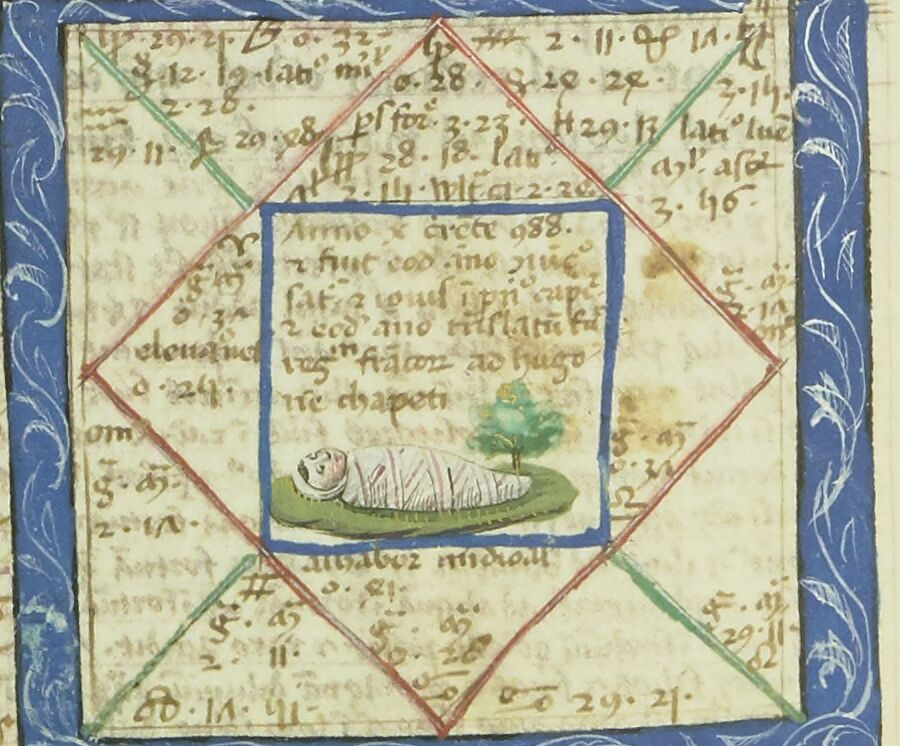
Horoscope Calculation

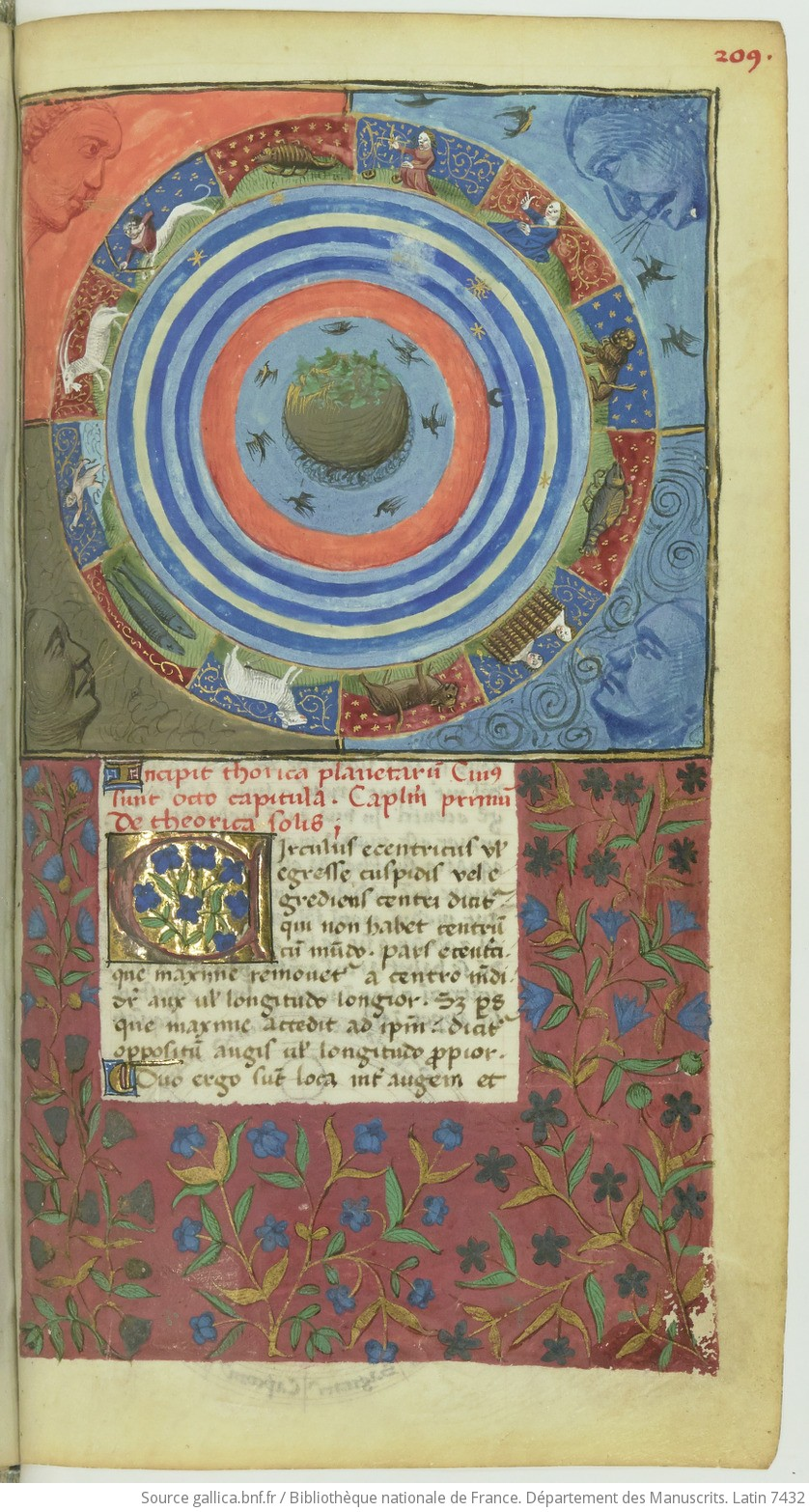
The earth in the Zodiac

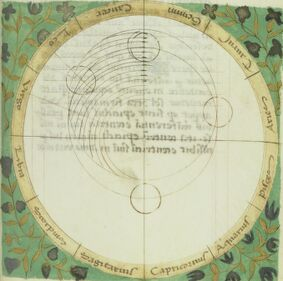
Unfinished Astronomical diagram

However, the most interesting type are the te illuminated (fol. 212r, 214r, 217r, 218v), decorated with a historiated miniature (fol. 125v, 129v, 131r), or were completely transformed into miniatures (fol. 209r, 224r Fig. 2–3). Not only illustrating theoretical content they also depict the object allegorically enabling researchers to understand the popular representation of those elements.

== Table of content ==
- 1r "De vita Ptholomei. Ptholomeus in omnibus scientiis... De Hermete. Hermes in Egipto natus fuerat..."
- 1v-3r Table of contents
- 3v-134r, 134v-151r Ptolemaica
- 151v-156v Messahallah Epistola de rebus eclipsium
- 157r-207v Alcabitius, Introductorius, with commentary by John of Saxony (a chapter index on folios 208r-208v)
- 209r-222v Theorica planetarum Gerardi, with commentaries
- 223r-223v Conrad Heingarter, star table verified for the meridian of Belleperche and the time of Jean II of Bourbon
- 224r-236v John of Saxony Canones tabularum Alphonsi
- NP 226v Marginal notes/calculations in Heingarter's hand
- 237r-238r De statione planetarum et retrogradatione
- 239r-258v Alfonsine tables
- 259r Incipit: 'Dixit divus Albertus Magnus: Hoc autem quod nivem...'
- 269r Incipit: 'Nota quod venti secundum Ptholomeum triplicitatis Arietis sunt inter...'
- 259v-263v Table on the points of essential dignities of each planet in each of the 360°
- 264r-266r Astronomia Ypocratis
- 266r-268r 'Incipit tractatus de pronosticis et componendis atque ministrandis medicinis. Magna utilitas atque laus medico...'
- 268r-268v Incipit: 'Sequitur de scientia pestilentie. In zodiaco sunt quedam loca...'
- 270r-275v Marginal notes in Greek

=== Margins ===
- 3v-134r Conrad Heingarter Commentum Quadripartiti Ptholomei
- 134v-151r Conrad Heingarter's commentary on Centiloquium

== Resource ==
- Digital exhibition on the manuscript:https://alfa.obspm.fr/
- Fully digitalised manuscript: https://gallica.bnf.fr/ark:/12148/btv1b100202503
