= Ibn Hibinta =

Ibn Hibintā (fl. 950) was a Christian in Iraq known from an Arabic manuscript on Islamic astrology al-Mughnī fī aḥkām al-nujūm, the second part of which is preserved in Munich.

Hibinta's lived during the reign of the Buwayhid rulers Ahmad ibn Buwayh (946–949) and ʿAḍūd al-Dawla (949–982) at Baghdad. His only known work, the Kitab al-Mughnī fī aḥkām al-nujūm (literally, the enriching book of the judgement of the stars) includes notes from Ptolemy, Dorotheus of Sidon, al-Khwarizmi and the Indian astrologer Kanaka. A manuscript copy of the second part is held as Arabic Codex 852 at the Bayerische Staatsbibliothek, Munich.
