= William Lilly =

English astrologer

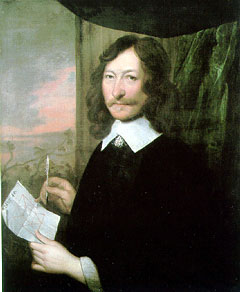
- Portrait of Lilly, aged 45, now housed in the Ashmolean Museum at Oxford
- Born: 1 May 1602; Diseworth, Leicestershire, England
- Died: 9 June 1681 (aged 79); Hersham, Surrey, England
- Occupations: Astrologer, author, translator astrological consultant
- Known for: Prophecy, astrological prediction, propaganda of English Civil War

William Lilly (11 May [O.S. 1 May] 1602 – 9 June 1681) was a seventeenth century English astrologer. He is described as having been a genius at something "that modern mainstream opinion has since decided cannot be done at all" having developed his stature as the most important astrologer in England through his social and political connections as well as going on to have an indelible impact on the future course of Western astrological tradition.

Born the son of a yeoman farmer in Leicestershire, Lilly travelled to London as a youth to take up a servant's position. Seven years later he secured his fortune by marrying his former master's widow, allowing him the leisure to study astrology. In 1644, during the English Civil War, he published the first of many popular astrological texts, and in 1647 he published Christian Astrology, a huge compendium of astrological technique. This was the first of its kind to be printed in the English language rather than Latin, and is said to have tutored "a nation in crisis in the language of the stars". By 1659, Lilly's fame was widely acknowledged and his annual almanac was achieving sales of around 30,000 copies a year.

Lilly's autobiography, published towards the end of his life in 1681, at the request of his patron Elias Ashmole, gives candid accounts of the political events of his era, and biographical details of contemporaries that are unavailable elsewhere. It was described, in the late 18th century, as "one of the most entertaining narratives in our language", in particular for the historical portrayal it leaves of men like John Dee, Simon Forman, John Booker, Edward Kelley, including a whimsical first meeting of John Napier and Henry Briggs, respective co-inventors of the logarithm and Briggsian logarithms, and for its curious tales about the effects of crystals and the appearance of Queen Mab. In it, Lilly describes the friendly support of Oliver Cromwell during a period in which he faced prosecution for issuing political astrological predictions. He also writes about the 1666 Great Fire of London, and how he was brought before the committee investigating the cause of the fire, being suspected of involvement because of his publication of images, 15 years earlier, which depicted a city in flames surrounded by coffins.

Lilly was a controversial character who was both aided and abetted by powerful friends and enemies. He attracted the attention of many members of Parliament, through the support of Sir Bulstrode Whitelocke, Lord Keeper of the Great Seal of England, (to whom he dedicated his Christian Astrology), but also accused Members of Parliament of engineering charges against him in 1651. To his supporters he was an "English Merlin"; to his detractors he was a "juggling wizard and imposter".

== Biography ==
=== Early life ===
Lilly was born on 1 May 1602 in the small village of Diseworth, Leicestershire; the thatched cottage his family lived in still stands near the village church. (Note: A photograph of the cottage is included in the Leicester Mercury report (see 'Star man Lilly's magic life' 5 March 2013). The report explains that during restoration of the cottage in the 1950s, "a wealth of hieroglyphics and astrological signs were revealed".) It was a substantial house for its time, although Lilly's father, (also called William), struggled with the cost of running his farm. By the time Lilly came to school age, his mother, Alice, complained about the family's back-slidings and decayed estate, yet she determined to give her son the best education the family could afford.

Lilly was fortunate in receiving a classical education at the Grammar school of Ashby-de-la-Zouch, under John Brinsley, one of the finest teachers of his time. Brinsley was strict in discipline but advocated encouragement and praise, and by the time Lilly left the school in 1619, he was excellently educated and excelled at Latin. This was to serve him well in his later astrological studies, since almost all astrological textbooks were written in Latin at that time.

Lilly's hopes of attending Cambridge University were dashed by his father's increasing poverty. His biography records his disappointment at being denied the opportunity that all of his fellow students enjoyed, even though he describes the knowledge of most of them as "defective":

[A]ll and every of those scholars who were of my form and standing went to Cambridge ... only poor I, William Lilly, was not so happy; fortune then frowning upon father's present condition, he not in any capacity to maintain me at the university.

A lesser opportunity came through his father's attorney, who recognised Lilly's level of education and recommended him to Gilbert Wright, Master of the Salters' Company and resident of the Strand in London (but formerly of Market Bosworth, Leicestershire). Wright was looking for a literate youth to act as his secretary and general servant, and at that time Lilly's father (then in prison for debt) was very happy to be rid of him, considering that since his son was no good around the farm, he was "good for nothing". With his letter of recommendation and just a few shillings, eighteen-year-old Lilly walked to London alongside a carrier's cart, later recounting "it was a very stormy week, cold and uncomfortable: I footed it all along".

Lilly received a warm welcome from Gilbert Wright, and worked as his servant until Wright's death in 1627. His biography recounts how, during these seven years, he was happy to perform all manner of menial tasks for his master; how he nursed Gilbert's wife through breast-cancer, until she died of the illness in 1624; how he survived the Great Plague of London in 1625; how his master married again in 1626 (a widow named Ellen Whitehaire), and then settled upon Lilly an annuity of £20 a year, before his death in May 1627.

Within months of Wright's death, the newly widowed Ellen made it clear that, having married twice for money, she was now looking to marry someone who would be loving and look after her, regardless of her suitor's status. Lilly took the "audacious" step of proposing himself, and despite her initial protestations that at 25 years of age Lilly was too young, they married in September of that year, keeping their marriage secret from her friends and family for two years.

Lilly describes a contented marriage with Ellen, which continued for six years. Upon her death she left everything to Lilly, of which he reports "it was considerable, very near to the value of one thousand pounds".

=== Astrological career ===
The comfortable lifestyle and fortune that Lilly inherited from Ellen, gave him leisure time to frequent sermons and lectures in London society. In 1632, shortly before Ellen's death, he began to study astrology, reading all the books on the subject he could fall in with, and occasionally trying his hand at unravelling mysteries by means of his art. The years 1642 and 1643 were devoted to a careful revision of all his previous reading, and in particular, having lighted on Valentine Naibod's Commentary on Alcabitius, he "seriously studied him and found him to be the profoundest author he ever met with." About the same time he tells us that he "did carefully take notice of every grandaction betwixt king and parliament, and did first then incline to believe that as all sublunary affairs depend on superior causes, so there, was: a possibility of discovering them by the configurations of the superior bodies." And, having thereupon "made some essays," he "found encouragement to proceed further, and ultimately framed to himself that method which he ever afterwards followed."

Lilly's most comprehensive book was published in 1647 and was entitled Christian Astrology. It is so large that it came in three separate volumes in modern times, and it remains popular even today and has never gone totally out-of-print. It is considered one of the classic texts for the study of traditional astrology from the Middle Ages, in particular horary astrology, which is mainly concerned with predicting future events or investigating unknown elements of current affairs, based on an astrological chart cast for the time a particular question is asked of the astrologer. Worked examples of horary charts are found in Volume 2 of Christian Astrology.

He then began to issue his prophetical almanacs and other works, which met with serious attention from some of the most prominent members of the Long Parliament. Lilly was on intimate terms with Bulstrode Whitelocke, William Lenthall the speaker, Sir Philip Stapleton, Elias Ashmole and others. Even John Selden seems to have acknowledged him, and probably the chief difference between him and the mass of the community at the time was that, while others believed in the general truth of astrology, he ventured to specify the future events to which he referred.

In 1650, Lilly wrote a preface to Sir Christopher Heydon's An Astrological Discourse with Mathematical Demonstrations, a defence of astrology written about 1608 which was first published posthumously, largely at the expense of Elias Ashmole.

=== Retirement and death ===
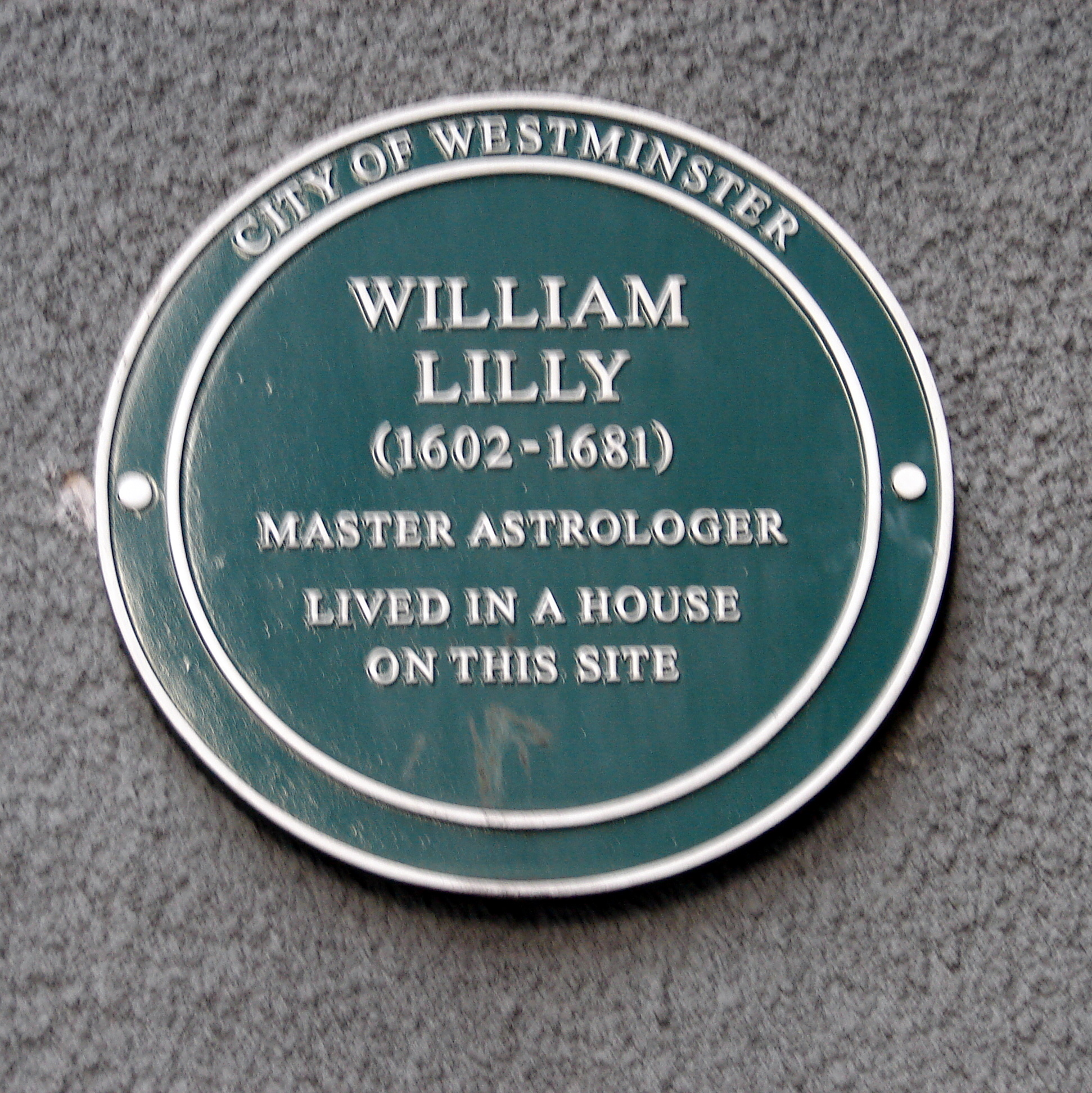
City of Westminster Green plaque, (given to "people of renown who have made lasting contributions to society") marking Lilly's London residence in the Strand.

After the Restoration he very quickly fell into disrepute. His sympathy with the parliament, which his predictions had generally shown, was not calculated to bring him into royal favour. He came under the lash of Samuel Butler, who, making allowance for some satiric exaggeration, has given in the character of Hudibras' Sidrophel a probably not very incorrect picture of the man; and, having by this time amassed a tolerable fortune, he bought a small estate at Hersham in Surrey, to which he retired, and where he diverted the exercise of his peculiar talents to the practice of medicine. He died in 1681. In 2003 a commemorative plaque was placed next to the disused Aldwych tube station on the Strand. Lilly lived in a house on the site from 1627 to 1665.

== Influence and works ==
The publication of a facsimile of the original 1647 edition of Lilly's Christian Astrology in 1985 by Regulus Publishing Company Ltd., in the UK, brought about a renaissance in astrological scholarship in North America and Europe, and also a transformation of the techniques of modern astrology. Olivia Barclay and other British astrologers began to unearth Lilly's astrological work, and were influential in the eventual re-publication of Christian Astrology.

Besides his 36 annual almanacs published between 1647 and 1682, Lilly's published works also include:

- Merlinus Anglicus Junior, 1644.
- Supernatural Sights and Apparitions seen in London, June 20th 1644, 1644.
- The Prophecy of the White King, 1644.
- England's Prophetical Merlin, 1644.
- Collections of Prophecies, 1646.
- Christian Astrology, 1647.
- The World's Catastrophe, or Europe's many mutations untill 1666, 1647; which includes 'A Whip for Wharton'; some copies also include Elias Ashmole's translations of The Prophecies of Ambrose Merlin, with a Key, and Trithemius, or the Government of the World by presiding Angels.
- An Astrologicall Prediction of the Occurrences in England for the years 1648, 1649, 1650, London, 1648, with 'Hamilton's nativity', and a dedication addressed to the House of Commons.
- Monarchy or No Monarchy, 1651.
- Mr. Lillyes Prognostications of 1667, predicting the Prosperity … of the English and their glorious Victories … by Land and Sea, 1667.
- The dangerous Condition of the United Provinces prognosticated, 1672.
- Mr. Lillies late Prophecy come to pass concerning the present War and the late unseasonableness of the Weather, 1673.
- Mr. Lillies Prophesie of a General Peace, 1674.
- Mr. Lillies Prophecy, or a sober Prediction of a Peace between the French and the Dutch and their Allies, 1675.
- Anima Astrologiae, or a Guide for Astrologers, being translated from Guido Bonatus, and Cardan's seaven Segments, with a new Table of the Fixed Stars, rectified for several years to come, 1676.
- Mr Lillies Astrological Predictions for 1677, proving the happy Condition of this our Nation for the Year ensuing, 1676.
- Mr. Lillies Prediction concerning the many lamentable Fires which have lately happened, with a full Account of Fires at Home and Abroad, 1676.
- Strange News from the East, or a sober Account of the Comet or blazing Star that has been seen several Mornings of late, 1677.
- Lillies New Prophecy relating to the Year, 1678.
- William Lilly's History of His Life and Times by William Lilly, 1681.
- Fore-Warn'd, Fore-Arm'd, or England's Timely Warning in general, and London's in particular, 1682.
- Catastrophe Mundi, Mr. Lilly's Hieroglyphicks exactly cut, 1683, a reissue of the appendix to Monarchy or No Monarchy, 1651.

== Sources ==
- Bayle, Pierre (1738). A general dictionary, historical and critical, vol.7. J. Bettenham.
- Capp, Bernard (1979). Astrology and the Popular Press: English Almanacs 1500-1800. Faber & Faber, Limited. ISBN 0571113796.
- Patrick Curry, Prophecy and Power: Astrology in Early Modern England, Princeton University Press, 1989.
- Dunn, Jane (2012). Read My Heart: Dorothy Osborne and Sir William Temple, A Love Story in the Age of Revolution. Harper Collins. ISBN 9780007373260.
- Geneva, Anne (1995). Astrology and the Seventeenth Century Mind: William Lilly and the Language of the Stars. Manchester University Press. ISBN 9780719041549.
- Houlding, Deborah (2010). An Annotated Lilly, part 1 (PDF). Skyscript.
- Kassell, Lauren (2007). Medicine and Magic in Elizabethan London: Simon Forman: Astrologer, Alchemist, and Physician. Oxford University Press. ISBN 9780199215270.
- Lewis, James (2003). The Astrology Book: The Encyclopedia of Heavenly Influences. Visible Ink Press. ISBN 9781578591442.
- Lilly, William (1647). Christian Astrology, London, John Partridge.
- Lilly, William (1681). William Lilly's history of his life and times (1774 reprint issued under the title The lives of those eminent antiquaries Elias Ashmole, esquire, and Mr. William Lilly, written by themselves, edited by Charles Burnham ed.). London: T. Davies.
- Parker, Derek (1975). Familiar to All: William Lilly and Astrology in the Seventeenth Century. Jonathan Cape. ISBN 022401112X.
