= Electional astrology =

Form of astrology used for planning events

Electional astrology, also known as event astrology, is a branch found in most traditions of astrology according to which a practitioner decides the most appropriate time for an event based on the astrological auspiciousness of that time. It differs from horary astrology because, while horary astrologers seek to find the answer to a question based on the time the question was asked, electional astrologers seek to find a period of time which will result in the most preferable outcome for an event being planned.

Historically used primarily to schedule battles, electional astrology has been used by its proponents to plan a number of events, including weddings and trips.

Modern discoveries about the true nature of celestial objects has undermined theoretical bases for believing that their motions affect luck, and empirical scientific investigation has shown that predictions and recommendations based on these systems are not accurate. Astrology in general counts as a pseudoscience.

== History ==
A rudimentary form of electional astrology was used by the Babylonians beginning sometime after the 16th century BCE. This and other Babylonian forms of astrology were passed on to the Egyptians, and Persians; Early Vedic astrologers also used a sophisticated form of electional astrology known as Muhurta (Muhurat) that was used for choosing the start of yajnas, travel, warfare, marriage and even filmmaking (muhurat shot) etc.

Modern electional astrology, as well as most other astrology, can in general be traced directly back to Book Five of Dorotheus of Sidon's treatises in Greek on the subject, Carmen Astrologicum from the 1st Century CE. This is the oldest treatise on electional astrology.

== Practice ==
In electional astrology, an astrologer is given an event the querent intends to plan. The astrologer then finds a date and time most auspicious for the event to take place, around which the querent bases the following plans. The method of coming to these conclusions is based on the relative positions of stars, planets and other celestial bodies at various times. Each celestial body's placement means something particular to the tradition the individual astrologer is using, in combination with the natal chart of the querent.

=== Event chart ===
An event chart is a horoscope that is cast for the date, time and place of a particular event. Such a chart is interpreted to gain insight into influences surrounding the event and an outlook for possible developments stemming from that event.

For example, astrologers can erect a chart for a major event, such as a marriage, and interpret it as though the event were a person in its own right. For example, if a chart was cast for the date of one's marriage then the chart would give an indication of what the couple can expect during their married life. If a chart is cast for a national event then one can interpret the chart to determine influences surrounding the event. This is in contrast to a birth chart, which is calculated for the actual time of a person's birth, but the design and interpretation are similar.

== Branches ==
Elections, or predictions for auspicious times, are usually divided into three branches, which are used depending on the type of event being planned.

=== Radical elections ===
Radical elections rest on the assumption that an election should be performed primarily based on the natal chart of the querent or person for whom the election is being performed. An underlying assumption of radical elections is that, because each person was born under different astrological conditions, the most auspicious time to hold an event will be different for each.

=== Mundane elections ===
Mundane elections involve using prominent mundane horoscopes ("mundane astrology" is concerned with world affairs) in force at the time for which the election is made.

=== Ephemeral elections ===
The most commonly used and distinctive form of election is the ephemeral election. These involve picking a date for an event based on the position of the celestial bodies in the sky at the moment of the event. Most of the time, when a person is talking about electional astrology, that person is referring to ephemeral elections. They can be described as "an horary chart set for a certain time in the future."

==== Magical elections ====
Ephemeral elections have been used in ancient and modern times to make talismans and seals. These items were seen to be imbued with the qualities of the auspicious date during which they were made, and their instruction is commonly found in medieval literature.
