= Horary astrology =

Form of astrology for answering questions posed

Horary astrology is an ancient branch of horoscopic astrology in which an astrologer attempts to answer a question by constructing a horoscope for the exact time at which the question was received and understood by the astrologer.

The answer to the horary question might be a simple yes or no, but is generally more complex with insights into, for example, the motives of the questioners, the motives of others involved in the matter, and the options available to them.

== Method ==
Horary astrology, as a system of divination, relies on principles consistent with broader astrological methods, but with some techniques unique to the branch. Unlike in natal astrology, where the chart represents one person's life, the horary chart represents factors unique to as specific situation, including objects and other people.

The person asking the question, or "querent," is represented by the ruler of the sign the first house cusp falls on in the horoscope. The position of and aspects to the Moon are of prime importance, with the Moon often representing the querent. Planetary aspects to the house cusps are considered more important than in other branches of astrology, although planetary rulers of the houses tend to take precedence in analysis.

Typically, a horary chart is read by first assigning the thing asked about, the "quesited", to a particular house in the chart. For instance, if asking "where is my lost dog?", the dog would be represented by the sixth house, as it is the house that governs small animals (traditionally, smaller than a goat).

The house cusp of the sixth house will be in a particular sign, for example Libra. Libra is ruled by Venus, so Venus is considered the "significator" of the lost dog. Venus's state in the horoscope will give clues to the animal's wellbeing, and its placement will give indications related to its location. Applying astrological aspects between the planet(s) representing the querent and those representing the quesited will indicate those two things coming together in the future.

=== Assigning houses ===
Horary astrologers use many different house systems, but in contemporary horary astrology the Regiomontanus house system is commonly used, following influential early modern horary astrologer William Lilly.

Understanding the correct house for the context of the question is pivotal to the correct interpretation of a horary question. In astrological theory, everything can be assigned to a house, and it is to that house, and its planetary ruler, that the assignation of the quesited is derived. Whatever planet is ruling the sign on the cusp of the house is taken to signify the quesited. For example, if the horary is about matters pertaining to career, the ruler of the tenth house, the house for careers and jobs, will indicate the quesited.

A short, non-exhaustive, list of possible associations with houses follows:

The First House

The querent (person asking the question). The querent's physical appearance, temperament, and mental state.

The Second House

The querent's finances, wealth, and material and financial possessions. Considered to represent moveable possessions as opposed to immovable possessions. Allies of the querent, such as lawyers in court cases.

The Third House

Siblings and neighbors. General comings and goings and short journeys and travels. Letters, emails and paperwork, including communications and contracts. Lower education such as elementary through to high school. Cars may be second or third depending on the context of the question.

The Fourth House

Parents. Immovable possessions as opposed to movable possessions, such as houses, gardens, and orchards. Mines, oil, buried treasure and anything which comes from the ground.

The Fifth House

Children, love affairs, romance, sex (pleasure and procreation). Gambling, speculation, arguments, games and pleasure. Any venue that caters to pleasures or provide entertainment including restaurants, clubs, bars and music venues.

The Sixth House

Illness and disease or sickness. Servants, or employees in contemporary horary astrology, including contractors. Pets and small animals, traditionally animals smaller than a goat (larger animals are twelfth house). Work and work environment. People with whom you work together in some kind of agreement.

The Seventh House

Marriage, partners and partnerships — both business and personal. Competitors and opponents of all kinds. Open enemies, as in enemies that you are aware of (hidden enemies are the twelfth house). If no other house suffices, use the seventh house to represent any other person.

The Eighth House

Death, fears, anxiety. Commonly used to indicate other people's money (see turning the chart below).

The Ninth House

Long distance travel, including travel to unknown locations. Foreigners and foreign lands. Universities and students of any subject of higher education such as doctors, lawyers, priests and astrologers. Visions, dreams and religion, as well as churches and philosophies. Books. Pilgrimages or journeys for spiritual or religious reasons.

The Tenth House

Career and persons of authority. Heads of state, the government generally, judges and royalty. Commonly used to indicate property belonging to a partner or opponent (see turning the chart below).

The Eleventh House

Friendships or groups. Wishes, hopes and aspirations.

The Twelfth House

Secrets, hidden motives and enemies, captivity, imprisonment and self-undoing. Things not yet known to the querent. Any form of non-voluntary bondage or captivity, monasteries, being voluntary and religious are ninth house. Traditionally associated with witchcraft, or any manner of secretly undermining the querent.

==== Turning the chart ====
"Turning the chart" is a technique to combine house significations, commonly to identify topics or things related to people who are not the querent. This is done by first selecting the house for the other person, and taking that house as if it was the first house of that person, and counting outwards. For example, to identify the house that represents the siblings of the querent's father, first start from the fourth house (which represents the querent's parents), then count to the third house (siblings) from the fourth house, resulting in the sixth house.

In this manner the sixth house (third from the fourth), in addition to its natural meaning, may also be used for any brothers and sisters of the father. In a horary question about, for example, the querent's aunt or uncle, the sixth house could then be used. Turned houses are called "derived" houses, as opposed to the normal "radical" houses.

=== Interpretation ===
Fundamental to horary astrology interpretation are the concepts of planetary dignity and reception. Planetary dignity is in two forms, essential and accidental. Essential dignity refers to the quality of a planet at a particular degree of the zodiac, and its ability to express its inherent nature. Accidental dignity refers to non-zodiac related factors that the planet is in. For example, if the planet is in a traditionally bad house (6th, 8th, or 12th) in the chart, if it is retrograde, aspected by malefic planet (Saturn or Mars), combust, or subject to various other factors, then it is considered an accidental debility and circumstantially hindered.

Reception refers to how each planet in a horary question chart views, or "receives", another planet, either favourably, unfavourably, or somewhere in between. This is determined by the zodiacal placement of the planets in question. For example, if The Moon is in Taurus, and Venus is in Cancer, then each of the planets is in the sign the other planet rules. This is called mutual reception by rulership, and shows the planets receiving each other favourably. In some horary questions, reception is used to delineate if different factors involved in the question are able to "receive" or interact with each other.

One factor of horary astrology is called the "radicality" of the chart. Some astrologers believe that they should avoid further judgment if a horary chart does not meet specific criteria. This rule is sometimes criticized by modern horary astrologers, such as John Frawley in his Horary Textbook, who states that the traditional rules of radicality should be ignored, while other astrologers continue to use them.

== See also ==
- Electional astrology
- Katarche
