= Dharma Karmadhipati yoga =

Planetary relation conferring good results

Dharma Karmadhipati yoga arises when the lords of the 9th and the 10th bhavas counted from the lagna or the Chandra-lagna (the Moon-sign), whichever is stronger, establish a sambandha (mutual relationship) preferably in a kendra or a trikonasthana; it is a shubha (auspicious) yoga . The 9th bhava (house) signifies Poorvapunya, Dharma and Bhagya, which are all auspicious significations. The 10th house, also known as Kirtisthana and the Rajyabhava, is the Karmabhava or the Karmasthana . In general terms the 10th house refers to occupation, profession or means of livelihood, temporal honours, foreign travels, self-respect, knowledge and dignity.

== Rationale ==
Without luck there is no reason for one to survive; the lord of the 9th house (a trikonasthana) which is the house of luck, occupying the 9th or a planet occupying its friendly or exaltation sign in the 9th house indicates a good name and good fortune, the person will be virtuous, prosperous and fortunate. Laghu Parashari tells us: -

केन्द्रत्रिकोणनेतारो दोषयुक्तावपि स्वयम् |
सम्बन्धमात्राद्बलिनौ भवेतां योगकारकौ ||

that the lords of the kendras and the trikonas even if they be tainted with malefic propensities become yogakarakas provided they establish a powerful sambandha i.e. relationship. The basic sambandhas are of five kinds, - 1) through the mutual exchange of rasis (signs), 2) through mutual aspect, 3) when one planet aspects the other planet but in turn is not aspected by the other planet, 4) through conjunction of two or more planets in the same sign and when planets occupy mutual-kendras or mutual trikonas; planets devoid of sambandha are restricted in their effects. If lords of a kendra and a trikona happen to establish a mutual relationship a Raja yoga is produced whose result becomes more pronounced if the lord of another trikona joins them but for any Raja yoga to produce more effective results the yoga-causing planets must form an immediate relationship with the lagna which is possible by occupying or aspecting the lagna or by associating with the lagna-lord without being afflicted by malefics or by the lords of the trikasthanas. There will be no yoga or Raja yoga if the dispositor of the lord of the lagna is combusted.

== Constitution ==
Laghu Parashari defines Dharma Karmadhipati yoga as follows: -

निवसेता व्यत्ययेन तावुभौ धर्मकर्मणोः |
एकत्रान्यतरो वापि वसेच्चेद्योगकारकौ ||
" The lords of the powerful Dharmasthana and Karmasthana in spite of being lords of a trikasthana by their other signs having mutual aspect, conjunction or association, give good results. "

In other words, a Raja yoga arises if the lord of the 9th is in the 10th house and the lord of the 10th occupies the 9th house or if both happen to conjoin in the 9th or in the 10th house provided the lord of the 9th does not simultaneously own the adjoining 8th and the lord of the 10th, the adjoining 12th house. The Raja yoga formed by these two lords is known as the Dharma Karmadhipati yoga.

== Impact ==
Mantreswara in his Phaladeepika verses 6.37-38 states that the person born with the lords of the 9th and the 10th giving rise to Raja yoga will be king or equal to a king. When he sets out on a journey, he will be greeted by bands like Bheri and sounds of Conch etc. He will have Royal Umbrella over his head and will be accompanied by elephants, horses and palanquins etc. Bards and minstrels will recite poems in his praise; he will be presented gifts by eminent persons.

Kalidasa in his Uttara Kalamrita (4.3-4) tells us that if the lord of the 9th in the 9th and the lord of the 10th in the 10th house; the lord of the 9th in the 10th and the lord of the 10th in the 9th house; or both fully aspect each other than both become Rajayogakarakas, and if these two planets form such an association also involving the lord of the 5th, the 7th, the lagna or the 4th house the person will be very wealthy and lead a happy life throughout provided they do not simultaneously rule the 8th or the 12th house, then there will be break in the operation of the Raja yoga. In case these unsullied powerful Rajayoga-causing planets also associate with the dispositor of the lord of the lagna the person will be an extremely wealthy and powerful ruler. He states that this yoga occurs with reference to the lords of the 9th and the 10th counted from the lagna or the 9th or the 10th house. The Raja yoga gives best results for Virgo and Pisces lagna, very good results for Taurus, Cancer, Sagittarius and Capricorn lagna, but mixed results in all other cases. Dharma Karmadhipati yoga is also called the Mudradhikari yoga, indicating that persons born with this yoga becomes a high-ranking government official.

Gopesh Kumar Ojha in his "Hindu Predictive Astrology" clarifies that in case the lord of the 9th house is strong in own sign or exaltation in the lagna or the 3rd or the 9th the person will be powerful and influential, if it is in conjunction with the lord of the 10th in a good house preferably in a kendra or a trikona, the person will enjoy Raja yoga, be fortunate and occupy a high position but if the lords of the 9th and 10th happen to exchange signs the person will occupy a high position and be in good books of the government. The lord of a kendra associating with a lord of a trikona is a contributory factor for good luck. Mehr Lal Soni Zia Fatehabadi was born in Pisces Lagna occupied by Venus with Dharma Karmadhipati yoga caused by Jupiter and Mars combining in the 10th house in Sagittarius sign, which yoga made him a high-ranking government official and also gave him fame as an Urdu language poet and writer.
