= Yoga-karakas =

Planets causing benefic results

Yoga-karakas are those planets which, according to Hindu astrology, confer fame, honour, dignity, financial prosperity, political success, and reputation. The lords of the kendras and trikonas (if not also owning a trikona; or associated with a trika-lord Lord of the 6th, the 8th, or the 12th house) associating with each other, or the lords of the 9th and 10th interchanging signs or fully aspecting each other, give rise to Raja yoga.

== Karakas ==
Karaka (कारक), the word derived from the verb Kr meaning to do or make; literally it means that which makes or causes an event. Vatsyayana states –"When a thing is a participant in an action or when it is endowed with a special functional activity, it becomes a "karaka" (Vatsyayana's Bhashya on Nayasutra II.i.16). Karakas remain constant under active paraphrase. According to Kiparsky and Staal they are the underlying relations of deep structure, belonging to a level intermediate between the level of semantic relations and the level of surface structure. And, Cardona states that things are karakas when they play certain roles in the accomplishment of an action (vyapara). The classification of the Karakas depends on the action denoted by particular items. This means action is 'that which is to be established' (saadhya) and the karakas are 'the establishers' (saadhakas).

In Hindu astrology, the word karaka is used to mean the 'significator' of a particular thing or event, and also causes that thing or event to occur. Each of the twelve bhavas or houses rule certain significances which are in turn ruled by a Karaka-graha i.e. planet particular to that house and significance, which planet is generally called the Karaka. The signification of the planets is known as Karakatva. The favourable or the unfavourable situation of the Karaka gives favourable or unfavourable results signified by it, and by the bhava and the bhava-lord. The effects of planets as Karakas ('functional benefics') or Akarakas ('functional malefics') or Marakas ('death-inflicting') are related to the Rasis or signs. Generally speaking each bhava has one or more Karakas or significators but it is bad for the bhava-lord or the bhava-karaka to occupy an evil trikasthana – the 6th, the 8th or the 12th from the lagna or from the concerned bhava. The Sun is the karaka of the lagna, the 9th and the 10th; Jupiter is the karaka of the 2nd, 5th, 10th and the 11th; Mars is the karaka of the 3rd and the 6th; the Moon is the karaka of the 4th; Mercury is the karaka of the 4th and the 10th; Saturn is the karaka of the 6th, 8th, 10th and the 12th and Venus is the karaka of the 7th house from the lagna; these are the Bhava-karakas.

== Yoga-karakas ==
The Yoga-karaka is the planet which rules a Kendra ('Angular house') and a Trikona ('Trine') simultaneously. Thus, Saturn is the yoga-karaka for Taurus and Libra, Mars for Cancer and Leo, Venus for Capricorn and Aquarius sign. The Sun, Mercury and Jupiter do not attain this status which the two Lunar Nodes can if they are aspected or associated with the lord of a kendra or a trikona. Yoga-karakas are first rate functional benefics, they are particularly suited to benefit a person materially and in status.

Kalyan Verma, citing Hari, states that the planet at the time of birth occupying its own sign, moolatrikona-rasi or exaltation sign in a kendra from the lagna becomes a yoga-karaka. Therefore, if for Cancer lagna the Moon and Jupiter are in the lagna, Saturn is in the 4th and the Sun and Mars combine in the 10th house, all these named planets become mutual yoga-karakas. The planet which is situated in its exaltation sign, friendly sign and in its own navamsa, and the Sun exalted in the 10th house become special Raja yoga-karakas (Saravali St.VI.1-6).

== Impact ==
According to Jataka Parijata, the designated Karakas of the 10th house i.e. of the Karmasthana, are a) Jupiter, which is the natural significator of wealth, body and life; b) the Sun, the natural significator of energy, will-power, authority and the Atman; c) Mercury, the natural significator of intellect, education, ability to write and business and d) Saturn, the natural significator of labour and hard-work.

Exalted planets if they are combust or retrograde or in neecha or inimical navamsa can even produce evil results. The planet which is in its exaltation sign in the rasi-chart but in its neecha-navamsa produces its bad results very soon; a planet situated in its debilitation sign in the rasi-chart but in its uccha-nvamsa proves to be auspicious but the occupation of one's own navamsa is superior to the occupation of the uccha-navamsa. Exalted planets confer better results if they are situated alone in their respective signs of exaltation, they become constrained in the presence of other planets that are not their 'dispositors'. The kendras and the trikonas not occupied by a Tara-graha indicate a turbulent life. If benefic planets and malefic planets occupy the kendras, and the Moon is either conjoined with Saturn or is in a navamsa owned by Saturn or if all three natural benefics along with the Moon, even if occupying own, friendly or exaltation signs, occupy inimical or neecha navamsas and Saturn is in the lagna cause yoga which makes one lead a very miserable life.

Janardan Harji in his Mansagari reiterates that the presence of Karaka-grahas will raise even a lowly-born to the status of a minister, the one born in a royal family will certainly be crowned a king, and adds that a benefic planet situated in the 2nd house from the Sun and the rest occupying the kendras give long-lasting riches and if the lords of the lagna and the Chandra-lagna along with Jupiter occupy the 10th house one becomes very fortunate or if Jupiter is in the lagna, Venus in the 4th, Mercury in the 7th and Mars is situated in the 10th house a person will be very fortunate, very wealthy and very generous.
