= Karmasthana (astrology) =

House in Hindu astrology

Karmasthana, also known as the Kirtisthana and the Rajyasthana, is the 10th bhava or house counted from the Lagna or the Ascendant or from the Chandra-lagna i.e. the natal position of the Moon. It is the house of action and the house of profession.

From the 10th house is judged the rank and status, position and authority, command, ruling powers, means of livelihood and all actions dealing with it, respect, honour, father, living abroad, debts etc. According to Rudra, the word, 'respect', connotes all sentiments and experiences which elevate and uplift the feeling of self-gratification, and the honour and homage paid by others whether by members of a clan or community or government. Vaidyanatha includes renunciation of worldly life and taking to asceticism, and Kalidasa adds trade, depositing of treasure, athletics, teaching, supremacy and fame as matters to be judged from this house. In general terms the 10th house refers to occupation, profession, means of livelihood, temporal honours, foreign travels, self-respect, knowledge and dignity. The analysis of this house too needs the study of the strength of the house, its lord, its occupants, its karakas and planets aspecting it, and also the different yogas bearing on it.

According to the basic principles of Hindu astrology the signs that are owned by natural benefics are auspicious signs as also those that are even signs and the shirshodaya signs (those rising with the head first); the odd signs, prashtodaya signs (those rising with their hind-portion first) and the signs owned by natural malefic are not auspicious signs; benefics become more benefic by occupying shirshodya signs. However, Jatakadeshmarga (p. 171) explains that natural malefics confer good results if they are not evilly inclined and are strong in shadabala i.e. occupy own, friendly or exalted rasi, hora, drekkena, navamsa, dwadasamsa and trimsamsa, and thus occupying benefic vargas (sub-divisions of signs) are aspected by benefics occupying benefic vargas; natural benefics that are weak in shadabala and occupying evil vargas are aspected by evil planets occupying evil vargas do not confer good results expected of them.

Power and fame are associated with the lagna or the Chandra-lagna, the 9th and the 10th house counted from these lagnas whichever is stronger; these houses and their respective lords should be strong and not afflicted. The location of Saturn in the 10th house from the Chandra-lagna even if occupying a friendly sign does not confer high status and fame, and if not aspected by Venus or Jupiter makes one earn a bad name and occupy subordinate position. Sankhya yoga arises if the lord of the lagna and the lord of the 10th house simultaneously occupy moveable signs and the lord of the 9th is not weak but vested with required strength; those born with Sankhya yoga enjoy the usual comforts of life, remain above want, possess a forgiving-nature, blessed with wife and son live in own residence, are learned and of good conduct and temperament, engage in good deeds and live very long.

The 10th house lives up to its promise if a benefic sign falls on the 10th house, its lord strong in all respects situated in benefic vargas associates with other planets who are also likewise vested with requisite strength, are beneficially inclined, own gainful bhavas preferably the lagna or the trikonas, and are in occupation of many benefic vargas. It is implied that a sign is vested with requisite strength if it is not influenced by unfriendly papa-grahas but by its own lord and/or friendly shubha-grahas, that the lord of the 10th house and the planets not owning unfavourable bhavas associating with it not situated in inimical signs, debilitation signs, in unfavourable bhavas, are not combust or in rasi-sandhi or bhava-sandhi. Phaladeepika (Sloka II.27) lists the dark-half Moon, the Sun, Mars, Rahu, Ketu and Saturn as papa-grahas; Mercury associating with papa-grahas acts as a papa-graha. Mantreswara, the author of Phaladeepika (vide Slokas XVI.27-28 p. 767) states that if there is a benefic in the 10th house and the strong lord of the 10th is in its own sign or if situated in its own sign is in a kendra or a trikona or the strong lord of the lagna is in the 10th house then one becomes fortunate, long-lived, engages in noble works, earns fame and enjoys the benefits of Raja yogas. The Sun or Mars situated in the 10th make one enterprising, valourous and popular if the lord of the 10th is also in a favourable sign and house, a benefic planet in the 10th makes one engage in praiseworthy acts but Saturn, Rahu or Ketu therein make one commit evil or unworthy deeds.

Jataka Parijata (Sloka XI.18) adds that the lord of the 10th house situated in the Lagna makes one self-made, meritorious and praiseworthy, if it is strong in shadabala and in the 2nd house it will confer exceptional fame but not when it is in the 6th, the 8th or the 12th, then one earns a bad name and suffers many hardships. The karakas (significators) of the 10th house, the Sun, Mercury, Jupiter and Saturn, weak and situated in the 6th, the 8th or 12th house compel one to commit evil deeds.

Varahamihira at the very beginning of Karmajeevadhyaya of Brihat Jataka states that from the Sun, etc., the acquisition of wealth must be predicted through father, mother, enemy, friend, brother, woman and servant respectively, when he occupies the 10th house from birth or Moon, or through the lord of the 10th or the lord of the navamsa occupied by the lord of the 10th, from birth, the Moon or the Sun, and that planets give wealth similar to the houses they occupy.

Kalyan Verma in Chapter XXXIII of his Saravali emphasizes that from the nature of the sign falling on the 10th house from either the Lagna or the Chandra-lagna, whichever is stronger, and from the nature of the planet occupying it, is to be judged the means of livelihood a person is likely to adopt. Dhundiraja in the section titled Dashamvichara of his Jataka Bharanam reiterates that the nature of a sign changes in accordance with the planet occupying it and the aspect of other planet that it receives or conjoins with, he has also like Kalyan Verma exhaustively dealt with these particular situations. For instance, Saravali states that Jupiter in its own Pisces sign makes one very learned, famous, respected, praiseworthy, steadfast, wealthy, proud, peace-loving and a minister adept in law and diplomacy (XXVII.23-4). If such a Jupiter is aspected by the Sun the person will be a rebel, poor and devoid of family; if by the Moon, he will command and enjoy all kinds of happiness, proud of his gains, position and possessions; if by Mars, cruel, battle-hardened and scarred but generous; if by Mercury, will rise to be an advisor to a king or very influential powerful person, blessed with wealth, sons and good fortune; if by Venus, be wealthy, learned, fortunate, happy and bear a spotless character and if by Saturn, be slovenly, fearful, shunned by own community and devoid of happiness (XXVII.55-60). But, Jupiter occupying its own sign in the 10th house if not otherwise weak or afflicted gives rise to the favourable Amla yoga, the person blessed with all means of wealth and comforts will be a very wise, clever and adept person who will earn much acclaim and fame (XXX.59). With regard to Pisces sign falling on the 10th house from the Lagna, Janardan Harji in the section titled Dwadashbhavasthitirasiphalam of his Mansagari (Sloka III.12) states that the person will receive diksha from his family guru under whose direction he will conduct himself on the path of Dharma, he will accomplish many objectives confidently, and will respect and serve learned people.

The 10th house and its lord are an important factor in the formation of yogas and Raja yogas. Venkatesa Sarma in his Sarvartha Chintamani (Sloka VIII.15-23) explains that the lord of the 10th house a benefic associated with or aspected by another benefic makes one exercise ruling or administrative powers. If the lord of the 10th occupies a kendra and the Sun also joins Mars in the 10th house or if Saturn joins the lord of the 10th in a kendra in a cruel shastiamsa along with the lord of the 8th he will be a harsh and a cruel administrator. If the lord of the 10th associating with benefics is in the 5th shashtiamsa then he will be an able leader and ruler. Best results are experienced in case the lord of the Chandra-lagna associates with benefics is hemmed by benefics and, the lord of the 10th, a benefic, is exalted or in a friendly sign gaining many benefic vargas. He states that the lord of the 10th house even though associating with papa-grahas will confer Raja yoga provided all planets severally occupy the first six bhavas counted from the lagna (IX.31).

Jataka Tattva reiterates that the person whose lord of the 10th house is in conjunction with benefic planets (Sutra X.19) or is hemmed and aspected by benefic planets (Sutra X.22) or is situated in a navamsa owned by a benefic planet (Sutra X.20), becomes renowned, however, any association with evil planets earns bad name only, makes one notorious (Sutra X.23) and makes his father suffer (Sutra X.57). Raja yoga arises if the 10th house formed by a fixed sign is occupied by the lord of the lagna and Jupiter is in a kendrasthana (Sutra X.148) or if the strong lord of the 10th house from the Natal Moon is in a kendra, in the 9th or in the 2nd from the Lagna (Sutra X.160).
