= Parajata yoga =

Hindu Planetary combinations for paternity

Parajāta yogas (Sanskrit: परजात – meaning stranger or servant or born of another) are special planetary combinations or yogas that indicate birth of children who are not genetically related to their father or non-marital children or born out of illicit connections of their married mothers. Illegitimate children are stigmatized for no fault of theirs; some, like T. E. Lawrence, are made to seek redemption of their mother’s status but most accept their fate like Satyakama Jabala did. In India, illegitimate children of a Hindu father do not inherit from him on intestacy but they do inherit from their mother at par with her legitimate children.

== Overview ==
Hindu astrology has taken due care in handling the sensitive issue of establishing one’s parentage when it is in doubt. The text books describe several yogas that establish a new-born’s paternity, or foretell its adoption or abandonment, but which yogas are meant to be judicially applied taking into account other relevant factors; they are not to be applied word for word. Parajāta yogas highlight the affliction caused by malefic influences on the lagna, on the Chandra-lagna (Moon-sign) and the Moon, and on Jupiter, the Karaka (significator) of children and the 5th house (the Sutabhava) counted from the lagna, the Moon and Jupiter. All such yogas require careful application supported by mathematical accuracy, interpretation and reasoning, and should not be mishandled.

== Yoga-description ==
Parasara in his Brihat Parasara Hora Shastra(Ch.XVI Slokas 13-14) states that a) the person born will not be the legitimate son of his father if the lord of the 5th house is in a moveable sign (in Aries, Cancer, Libra or Capricorn), the Moon joins Rahu and Saturn is in the 5th house, or b) if Jupiter is in the 8th house from the Moon and the Moon is in the 8th house from the lagna both either aspected or in conjunction with malefic planets.

Varahamihira in his Brihat Jataka (Ch.V.Sloka 6) states that if at the time of birth Jupiter does not aspect the lagna and the Moon or the Moon in conjunction with the Sun or the conjunction of the Moon, the Sun and a malefic planet, then the child will be illegitimate.

Kalyan Verma in his Saravali(Ch.IX. Slokas 32-33) states that the child will be illegitimate if a)the lagna or the Moon are not aspected by Jupiter, b) if the conjunction of the Sun and the Moon is not aspected by Jupiter, c) if the Sun and the Moon in conjunction with a malefic planet are not aspected by Jupiter, d) if Jupiter, the Moon and the Sun are in their debilitation signs and Saturn is in the lagna and no benefic planet aspects the lagna, the Moon or Venus.

Janardan Harji in his Mansagari (Ch.IV Slokas 91,92,93,96) states that birth of an illegitimate child is indicated if a) the lagna is occupied by a malefic planet and no planet aspects the lagna or b) if the birth occurs at the fag-end of the tithi, day (i.e. near Sunset), lagna, in the last navamsa of a moveable sign or c) if the Moon hemmed between Mercury and Venus does not aspect the lagna occupied by Saturn and Mars is in the 7th house or d) if the lagna is not aspected by Jupiter or Venus, and Mars and the Moon do not aspect the Sun.

Bhogiraj Dwivedi cites an old maxim to the effect that an illegitimate child is born if on 4th (Chaturthi), 9th (Navami) or 14th (Chaturdashi) tithi which coincides with Sunday, Saturday or Tuesday and when the Moon is also in the 3rd pada of Uttaraphalguni, Uttarashada or Uttarabhadrapada nakshatra.

== Cancellation of yoga-effects ==
Vaidyanatha Dikshita in his Jataka Parijata (Ch.III Sloka 48-55) tells us that if the Moon is in a sign owned by a benefic planet or is in vargas owned by Jupiter a legitimate child is born but not when - a) the 12th house is aspected by the Sun or b) if the Sun and the Moon are in a varga of the Sun or the Moon or c) if Jupiter does not aspect the lagna or the Moon or d) Jupiter neither occupies the lagna nor conjoins with the Moon or e) if the lagna or the Moon is not in Jupiter’s vargas which are actually words advising exercise of caution in handling yogas indicating birth of an illegitimate child. In his notes to Sloka V.6 of Brihat Jataka, the commentator, N. Chidambaram Iyer, has also cited Yavaneswara who states that if the lagna-navamsa or the navamsa occupied by the Moon is owned by Jupiter the child will not be illegitimate. And, that according to Garga the child will not be illegitimate if a) the Moon is in Sagittarius or Pisces or b) if the Moon is in conjunction with Jupiter in any other sign or c) if the Moon is in a drekkena or navamsa of Jupiter. If a Parajāta yoga is found to occur and at the same time any one of the condition mentioned by Garga, Yavaneswara and Vaidyanatha indicating legitimate birth is also met then that particular birth will not be of an illegitimate child.
