= Uttara Kalamrita =

Hindu astrological text

Uttara Kalamrita is a reference work on Vedic astrology or Jyotisa. It is also termed as sidereal astrology, written by Kalidasa. However, it is unknown whether the Kalidasa who wrote this work is the same Kalidasa who wrote Raghuvamsha and Abhijñānaśākuntalam. The manuscript is available in various libraries in India, including the Government Oriental Manuscript Library in Chennai.

== History ==
The text was first printed in the Telugu script. The reference to Andhra Bhasha, Urdu or Persian, Turushka, Sukkani, Rahu Kala, and other things show that he came after the sixteenth century. His use of the words Udyoga, got job, mud-cleaning, Smarta, Nadi and Vinadi, Sarasa-sallapa (a peculiar Telugu expression), Tyajya Kala and others prove that he is South Indian. His opposition to the marriage with the daughter of the maternal uncle references to the usages in the South in the states of Karnataka and Tamil Nadu.

These and other factors convince us that the author belongs to a time after the 16th or the 17th century.

There is a Shankara Vijaya attributed to Madhava Vidyaranya, but the next clearly states that the author was condensing the work of Vyasachala (17th century) and that he was called Abhinava Kalidasa. Possibly the author of Uttara Kalamrita is the same one.

The Uttara Kalamrita contains a wealth of astrological principles which are derived from earlier works on astrology namely Brihat Parashara Hora Shastra, Brihat Jataka & Phaladeepika.

== Key highlights of Uttara Kalamrita ==
1. Detailed information regarding the how to perform nakshatra rectification, how to calculate the position of Mandi and Gullika, the situation of the place of birth of the native, the position of lamp when the child was born, the position and location of father of the child.

2. Information on Natural and Functional relationship of planets, knowledge of Kendras and Trikonas, Details on Retrograde planets, exaltation and debilitation of planets, calculation of Shadbala.

3. Ways of calculation of longevity of a person. Mathematical formulae anshayu, lagnayu, knowing the past, present and future using deshkran, Ayurdaya using planetary yogas, yogas for short life, long life.

4. Description of various yogas including Raja yogas, Viparita Raja yogas, fructification and cancellation of Raja Yogas, Finding benefic and malefic planets, Yogakaraka planets etc. A chapter to study basic astrology principles.

5. Excellent list of significators of houses, planets.

6. Detailed descriptions of Dasha and its significance. Results of various planetary dasha with little known rules. How to time events using dasha and transit.

7. How to calculate ishta lagna, nashta jataka details, prashna lagna and answering queries of users on lost articles.

8. Nakshatra results, Muhurta for various karmas.

9. Details on Karma Kanda, Process to be followed for marriage etc.

== Significators ==
Uttara Kalamrita stands out as a vedic astrology reference book because of an exhaustive list of significators. No other reference on vedic astrology provides such an exhaustive collection. Naisargika Karakas in Vedic Astrology refer to specific significators or indicators that show various aspects of existence within the creation. These karakas include Rahu, Ketu, and the seven planets (Sun, Moon, Mars, Mercury, Jupiter, Venus, and Saturn). They are presided over by Brahma, the creator deity. Interestingly, Naisargika karakas not only represent human beings but also encompass various impersonal things and matters that exist in Brahma's creation and can influence an individual. Uttara Kalamrita references about Naisargika Karakas extensively.

The Significators are listed in Chapter 5.

1. Significators of the twelve houses (bhavas)
2. Significators of Planets (Graha)

== See also ==
- Viparita Raja yoga
