= Aiśvarya =

Sanskrit term for sovereignty

Aishvarya (Sanskrit: ऐश्वर्य) means lordship or sovereignty, prosperity or royal or exalted rank. Prosperity, power and recognition by society are the three aspects of a man’s life that constitute aishvarya which term also refers to the aishvarya or greatness of God and of Brahman.

== Overview ==
The word Aishvarya is derived from the word ईश meaning supreme, powerful, lord or master or God as in the phrase - ईशावास्यमिदं सर्वं – God certainly resides in all this (Isha Upanishad Mantra 1). It is directly connected with one’s ego at the individual level, and with the assumed nature of God.

== Basic understanding of the term ==
Prosperity, power and recognition by society are the three aspects of a man’s life that constitute aishvarya. They are the basic needs and aspirations of a man about which he dreams and he plans and for achieving which objectives he performs varying deeds. He also eagerly strives to know about the timing and extent of their fulfillment for which he has devised different means and methods. In Hindu astrology, Vaibhava ('opulence'), which includes Prabhava ('influence'), Dhana ('wealth') and Aishvarya ('magnificence'), is represented by the 6th house, the 9th house and the 11th house from the lagna and their respective lords. Mantreswara in the Chapter XX of his Phaladeepika states that during the dasha of the strong lord of the 6th house one gains aishvarya and crushes foes, during the dasha of the strong lord of the 9th house a person enjoys aishvarya, and during the dasha of the strong lord of the 11th house one experiences constant increase of aishvarya.

Shakti as Goddess Annapoorna fulfills the most basic physiological need of man that of food items and clothes; as Goddess Durga Shakti fulfills the needs such as shelter and safety from natural and man-made threats; as Goddess Lakshmi and Goddess Saraswati Shakti fulfills the social needs such as education, social status and recognition in the society; out of the eight forms of Lakshmi, Aishvarya Lakshmi refers to riches and Dhana Lakshmi, to gold and money.

== Upanishadic exposition ==
The sage of the Shvetashvatara Upanishad describes the all-pervading aishvarya or greatness of the Lord (Brahman) in the following words:

तमेकनेमिं त्रिवृतं षोडशान्तं शतार्धारं विंशति प्रत्यराभिः |
अष्टकैः षड्भिर्विश्वरूपैकपाशं त्रिमार्गभेदं द्विनिमित्तैकमोहाम् ||

“They saw him as the one rim (of the wheel), with three tiers, sixteen ends, fifty spokes, twenty fasteners, having six variations of eight extensions, one bondage of infinite forms, three different paths and the two (Virtue and Vice) which cause delusion.”

The wheel is the Brahma-chakra, the repeated cycle of origination and destruction of inanimate things, and of birth and death of all living beings; the rim is the singular non-dual support of the Karya Jagat which is the unreal whole world of phenomenon of effects and has Maya as its source. The Karya Jagat is covered by the three Gunasi.e. by (Sattva, Rajas and Tamas), and their sixteen transformations or manifestations (the five primordial elements, the mind, the five sense organs and the five organs of action) which give satisfaction and pleasure through contacts with objects and constitute the Prakrti ashtakam (existence and awareness of objects), the Dhātu ashtakam (the contact of senses with the objects) and the Aishvarya ashtakam (the psychological forces which bind and cause one to rotate in samsara) which are the three kinds of bondages. The fifty spokes are the fifty psychological forces or misconceptions due to Maya. The one bondage of infinite forms is the fundamental bondage consisting of Vāsanā i.e. desire or emotion. There are the eight siddhis or successes. "Righteousness", "Unrighteousness" and "Knowledge" are the three paths, and virtue and vice are the two factors that cause delusion.

== Aishvarya yoga of Bhagavad Gita ==
Bhagavad Gita in its own way, presents Krishna as the Supreme Godhead and the supreme object of worship. Krishna tells Arjuna:-

न च मत्स्थानि भूतानि पश्य मे योगमैश्वरम् |
भूतभृन्न च भूतस्थो ममात्मा भूतभावनः ||

"“Nor do beings exist (in reality) in Me – Behold My Divine Yoga supporting all beings, but not dwelling in them, I am My Self, the efficient cause of all beings.” - Bhagavad Gita IX.5.

In this regard, Chinmayananda explains that –“In Pure Awareness, in Its Infinite Nature of sheer Knowledge, there never was, never is and never can be any world of pluralistic embodiment. Pure Consciousness, Divine and Eternal, is the substratum that sustains and illumines the entire panorama of the ever-changing plurality.” and Prabhupada explains that the Lord is everywhere present by His personal representation, the diffusion of His different energies because of which creation takes place and therefore all things rests on Him but He is different from all things, this is the yogam aisvaram, the mystic power of God. Jayadayal Goyandaka explains that when a man realizes God, then nothing exists in his conception of God; therefore in the eyes of him who has attained this state, the world does not exist in God, in reality nothing exists but God. The words Aisvaram yogam denote the wonderful power of God, that of remaining absolutely detached from everything, and the words MaMa Atma refer to His qualified, formless aspect.

== Shaivite exposition ==
The Shaivites know aishvarya or Aishvarya-tattva as the Ishvara-tattva, the tattva of realizing what constitutes the Lordliness and the Glory of the Divine Being. It is the stage which succeeds Sada-Shiva Tattva as the stage of making a full survey of, identification with, what constitutes the state of the Experiencer, of the pure and undivided "this" aspect of his being as a whole, of the Ideal Universe hitherto lurking as an indistinct picture in the background of the Being. The Sadakhya or the Sada-Shiva Tattva state is Jnana, the power of being conscious or the experience of the "I", and Aishvarya or the Ishvara-tattva is true identification or the experience of being identified with and merged into the "this" of the vakya "I am This". It is the fourth step in the evolution of mental aspects of universal manifestation.

== Vaishnava exposition ==
Aishvarya is the Sanskrit term derived from Ishvara that refers to the opulence and power of God. According to Gaudiya Vaishnavism, God has both a public face and a private face. Manifesting his power and majesty (aishvarya), he is known as Narayana and is served in awe and reverence, when his beauty and sweetness (madhurya) overshadows his majesty he is known as Krishna-aishvarya (God’s supreme divinity and power) is one of the general dimensions of Krishna’s Divinity described by Chaitanya school, the other two being – madhurya ('divine tenderness and intimacy') and karunya ('compassion and protection'). This school favours the madhurya aspect rather than aishvarya aspect in which the Jiva does not experience a love for God as exalted as is experienced by the devotee in madhurya aspect. Manifestations of the aishvarya aspect assist in the realization of Krishna’s madhurya aspect. According to Vishnu Purana, Aishvarya ('Omnipotence or Controlling power or Transcendent majesty' ) is one of the six folds of God’s majesty, the other five being – Dharma or Virya ('Virtue or Potency or Creative power'), Yasha ('Glory, Fame, Universal honour'), Sri ('Beauty, Prosperity or Radiant beauty'), Jnana ('Omniscience, Knowledge, Omniscient knowledge') and Vairagya ('Non-affectedness or Dispassion or Renunciation or Serene dispassion'), which attributes eternally reside in God in the relation known as samavaya-sambandha ('perpetual co-inherence'), the inseparable relation that exists between substance and quality. God’s divine potency, inconceivable to human mind, is natural to Him and constitutes His essence; God’s relation with his Divine potency is one of inconceivable difference in non-difference known as achintya-bhedabheda, the recognition of the nature of which relation is Chaitanya’s philosophy of achintya bhedabheda-vada. God’s aishvarya includes his embodied life as the universe and his avatars descending into it. Govinda which term means the Indra of cows and the rescuer of earth that was taken to a secret place also refers to the late evening and Phalguna-masa (month) as does Madhava which refers to early morning and Magha-masa (month). Govinda is aishvarya and Madhava is virya.

== See also ==
Prajñā (Hinduism)
