= Sannyasa yoga =

Aspect of Hindu astrology

Sanyasa yoga in Hindu astrology are the peculiar planetary situations or combinations seen in certain horoscopes that indicate Sanyasa i.e. renunciation of worldly material life by persons born with those yogas. Sanyasa yogas are also known as Pravrajya yogas.

== Sanyasa ==
The concept of sanyasa is first mentioned in the Mundaka Upanishad; it denotes renunciation. A Sanyasi is one who has risen above the mundane ambitions of a householder and has chosen the silence and penance of a recluse. According to the Bhagavad Gita, Sanyasa means the relinquishing of actions arising from desires, and Tyaga means relinquishing of the fruits of all actions. It is said that sanyasis are eligible to pursue the path of knowledge (jnana yoga); they have no need to perform Vedic rituals or tend the sacred fire ((Brahma Sutra III.iv.25).

== Sanyasa yogas ==
Sanyasa yogas in Hindu astrology are the planetary situations or combinations in certain nativities (horoscopes) indicating Sanyasa. Sanyasa yogas are also known as Pravrajya yogas. They are auspicious yogas.

The authentic Sanyasa yogas are very rare. Sanyasa yoga arises when four or more strong planets combine in one house or sign. The nature or kind of Sanyasa adopted depends upon the strongest planet in that particular group of planets. If the Sun is the strongest planet in the chart, the person is of high morals and intellectual prowess, and will choose severe and austere practices in remote places; if it is the Moon, then the practice is in seclusion, and more in the study of scriptures; if it is Mercury, one is easily influenced by philosophy of others; if it is Mars, one chooses to wear red-coloured clothes and struggles to control his temper; if it is Jupiter, one has complete control over his senses and sense-organs; if it is Venus, a wandering mendicant, and if the strongest planet is Saturn it makes one adopt exceedingly severe practices. The involvement of the lord of the 10th house in this conjunction of four or more planets is the stronger indicator of Sanyasa. If those four or more planets happen to conjoin in a kendra or in a trikona, then the person attains Moksha but if they conjoin in the 8th house there will be Yogabhrashta i.e. there will be break in yoga-operation, and fall from the final state of emancipation. If strongest of the conjoining planets is combust then there will be no sanyasa and if it is defeated in planetary warfare one returns to worldly life after taking sanyasa. Sanyasa is also indicated when the Moon is in a drekkena of Saturn and is aspected by Mars and Saturn, or is in a navamsa of Mars aspected by Saturn. A person takes to sanyasa if the dispositor of the Moon is aspected by Saturn and not by any other planet or if aspected by all planets occupying a single house or sign or if Jupiter is in the 9th house and Saturn aspects the lagna (Ascendant), the Moon and Jupiter, such a person will write on Shastras and found a school of philosophy, and in case Saturn not aspected by any planet is in the 9th house then one born a king will take to sanyasa.

== Sanyasa yoga – Implications of ==
Sanyasa yogas formed by benefic planets in dignity bless a person with an evolutionary elevation of the total personality and sublimation of primeval urges. When four or more planets combine in one house Sanyasa yoga does arise, (Buddha had, at the time of his birth, five planets situated in the 10th house which included a weak Saturn occupying its sign of debilitation), or when the Ascendant lord is aspected by Saturn alone or Saturn aspects a weak lagna lord or when the Moon in a drekkena of Saturn occupies a navamsa of Mars or Saturn and is aspected by Saturn in which situation according to Phaladeepika if the lord of lagna aspects a weak Moon the sanyasi will lead a very miserable life but if there be a Raja yoga obtaining he will be venerated by rulers of the world. If the Sanyasa yoga is afflicted by malefic influences then the person with that Sanyasa yoga will take up sanyasa but prove a shame to that order being vulnerable to baser instincts and lowly conduct and acts.

Four planets conjoining in the 10th house from the lagna or four planets aspecting the 10th house or if the lord of the lagna and the lord of the 10th join with any three planets anywhere, give sanyasa but if Saturn joins, there will be no sanyasa. And, in case the Moon and Jupiter join Mercury and Mars in the 10th or in Pisces sign, then Moksha becomes assured. If more than one planet is powerful out of four there will be no sanyasa yoga, when two planets are powerful then one takes sanyasa of the kind indicated by the more powerful one only to discard it to take up sanyasa of the kind indicated by the less powerful. One of the four or more planets conjoining must be very strong to confer sanyasa but if the sanyasa causing planet is combust or if it is defeated in Grahayuddha (planetary warfare) and aspected by other planets there will be no sanyasa but the person will worship sanyasis i.e. those who have taken up sanyasa.

== Sanyasa yogas – their significance ==
Sanyasa yogas compel a person to give up all wealth and material possessions; he then becomes a mendicant and begs for alms. These yogas are a class apart, they are Shubha-yogas (auspicious yogas) and are not ava-yogas (evil yogas) indicating poverty. They compel a person to renounce the world and seek the Ultimate Truth. Raja yogas obtaining along with Sanyasa yogas make a person a world-renowned Dikshita and may be a pious ruler who is widely worshipped. A weak Saturn casting its aspect on the weak lord of the Ascendant generally makes one take to the path of renunciation. If the lord of the bhava in which the Sanyasa yoga occurs is associated with Rahu or combines with Gulika in a cruel amsa, or if benefics do not aspect the said lord, then that Sanyasa yoga will be defunct. Chengiz Khan, the mighty Mongol warrior, was born at 1.30 A.M on 16/09/1186 A.D.with six planets combining in one sign and house i.e. in Virgo in the 3rd house from the lagna which grouping included a strong Uchhabhilashi Saturn, he did not take to the path of renunciation. He was a ruthless warrior and a wandering conqueror as foretold by Saravali for this conjunction and a powerful ruler as ordained by Laghu Jataka Sarwaswa vide Verse 537 which states that if all planets are in the 12th from the Moon and aspect the 6th house from the Moon then a Raja yoga is caused and the person lives for 68 years; Chengiz Khan lived for 68 years.

Varahamihira states that if the Lagna falls in an even sign, and the three natural benefics along with Mars are all powerful to do good then a woman becomes a famous Vedantin, and if the 7th house is tenanted by a cruel planet and the 9th by mild benefics then she will embrace the kind of Sanyasa as is indicated by the planet occupying the 9th house. In a Capricorn Lagna nativity that had Rahu in the 5th, Mars in the 6th, Saturn in the 7th, the Sun and the Moon in the 8th, Venus and Mercury in the 9th, Jupiter and Ketu in the 11th despite a powerful Bhagya Yoga obtaining and all three natural benefics being placed ahead of the Sun and the Moon the lady did not receive Diksha because Saturn did not aspect the Moon or its dispositor, and Mars did not aspect the 9th house.

Jataka Bharanam reiterates that if Jupiter is either in the 5th house or in the Lagna and the Moon is situated in the 10th house then the person will be a Tapasavi i.e. the one who has conquered his senses and who possesses the finest of intelligence, is persevering, hardworking and successful. This is a yoga of a very high order and gives excellent results provided both Jupiter and the Moon gain favourable vargas and nakshatras. The significant factor in this yoga-formation is the lord of the sign of exaltation for Devaguru (Jupiter) occupying the all-important Karmasthana (house of action).
