= Dhana yoga =

Planetary benefit giving wealth

Dhana yogas are astrological combinations or yogas for wealth and prosperity which prove more fruitful if both the lagna and its lord are strong, and there are no Arista yogas present affecting the Dhana yoga - causing planets and the bhavas associated with earning, acquisition, and accumulation of wealth. Jupiter is one of the natural Dhana-karaka (significator of wealth), a strong Jupiter gives lifelong prosperity and financial stability.

== Indicators of wealth ==
According to the Parasari School of Hindu astrology, the lord of the 2nd house or bhava counted from the lagna (birth ascendant) and the 11th bhava are concerned with earning and accumulation of wealth. Along with these two bhavas the other bhavas to be reckoned with are the 5th and the 9th bhavas which are known as the abodes of Lakshmi, the Goddess of wealth; the inter-relationship of these bhavas, which are wealth-giving bhavas, and their respective lords, ensure wealth and prosperity. Planets simultaneously owning two wealth-giving bhavas become the prime indicators of wealth, the strongest indicator is the one that owns both the 2nd and the 11th bhavas and the next in order are the ones who own the 5th or the 9th. Dhana yogas depend on the lord of the 2nd who determines wealth, in-flow of wealth i.e. income, is to be judged from the 11th, gains through speculation from the 5th and sudden unexpected gains from the 9th bhava. Hindu astrology considers the 2nd house as the house of accumulated wealth, and the 11th as the house of gains, these lords associated with the lords of the 5th and 9th give rise to formidable Dhana yogas which if unblemished and formed by benefic planets promise much wealth. The lords of the 1st, the 2nd, the 5th, the 9th and the 11th bhavas mutually associating cause Dhana yogas to arise, but only when the said yogas happen to connect with the lagna that more significant result are seen derived.

== Dhana Yogas ==
Dhana yoga occurs- a) when the lord of the lagna and the lord of the 2nd together, associate with the lord of the 5th, the 9th or the 11th bhava; b) or when the lord of the 2nd associates with the lord of the 5th, the 9th or the 11th bhava; c) or when the lord of the 5th associates with the lord of the 9th or the 11th bhava d) or when the lord of the 9th associates with the lord of the 11th bhava. Parashara has paid extraordinary attention to the 5th and the 9th bhavas in Dhana yoga formations, thus,

- Venus in the 5th in own house and Mars in the lagna,
- Mercury in the 5th in own house and the Moon, Mars and Jupiter in the 11th
- The Sun in the 5th in Leo and the Moon, Jupiter and Saturn in the 11th
- Saturn in the 5th in own house and the Sun and the Moon conjoining in the 11th
- Jupiter in the 5th in own sign and Mercury situated in the 11th
- Mars in the 5th in own sign and Venus in the 11th
- Moon in the 5th in own house and Saturn in the 11th

give rise to fruitful Dhana yogas. The lagna and the lord of the lagna also contribute to Dhana yoga formation. Thus,

- the Sun in Leo lagna associating with Mars and Jupiter;
- Moon in Cancer lagna associating with Mercury and Jupiter;
- Mars in own lagna associating with Mercury, Venus and Saturn;
- Mercury in own lagna associating with Jupiter and Saturn;
- Jupiter in own sign in the lagna associating with Mars and Mercury;
- Venus in Taurus or Libra lagna associating with Mercury and Saturn;
- Saturn in own sign in the lagna associating with Mars and Jupiter

give rise to Dhana yogas. Because they are the Lakshmisthanas i.e. wealth-giving bhavas, the 5th and the 9th bhavas and their lords, and planets associating with the lords of these trines and trinal lords giving rise to significant Dhana yogas ensure wealth and prosperity. Indu lagna is also an indicator of wealth, when several planets associate with it or occupy kendras from it, riches are ensured. Evident as it is from the essential involvement of the lords of the lagna and the trikonas, gain of wealth is more a result of one’s own good previous karmas, rasi-parivartana between the lord of the lagna and the lord of the 2nd, the Dhana bhava, is highly desirable.

== Special Dhana yogas ==
- Rahu, Venus, Mars and Saturn combining in Virgo (Kanya) sign give immense wealth. Note: Some vedic astrologers are of opinion that Rahu, Mars and Venus in Kanya (Virgo) sign gives wealth. They exclude Saturn from this planetary combination.
- The Sun in a kendra in a friendly Navamsa and aspected by the Moon and Jupiter makes one very rich and learned.
- Jupiter, Mercury and Saturn occupying their own signs make one long-lived and gain riches regularly throughout life.
- (1-2-11)The lord of the lagna in the 2nd, the lord of the 2nd in the 11th and the lord of the 11th in the lagna make one amass great wealth
- (11-2-1) The lord of the 11th house is in the 2nd, the lord of the 2nd is in the 1st, and the lord of the 1st is in the 11th, makes great wealth
- The lord of the 2nd and the 10th in conjunction in a kendra and aspected by the lord of the navamsa occupied by the lord of the lagna, person becomes wealthy early in life.

== Significance ==
In terms of the Parasari principles, the lord of the Dhana bhava i.e. the 2nd house, should occupy either its own house or a kendra to make one wealthy; the lord of the Dhana bhava situated in a triksthana i.e. the 6th, the 8th or the 12th, causes loss of wealth. The lord of the Dhana bhava in its own or exaltation sign and aspected by Jupiter makes one liked by others, famous, wealthy and generous. Jupiter conjoining with Mars in the 2nd house gives much wealth and so do the lords of the 2nd and 11th occupying each other’s house or conjoining in a kendra or a trikona. The lord of the 2nd in a kendra aspected by Jupiter or Venus and the lord of the 11th house also situated in a trikonabhava makes one very rich.

Any association of the lords of the 2nd, the 11th, the 5th, and the 9th bhavas, strong and mutually inclined, indicates gain of wealth. The lords of the Dhanasthana and the Labhasthana conjoining in a kendra and vested with strength confer much wealth which increases manifold by these bhava-lords simultaneously associating with the lords of the two trikonas; the trikona-lords are significators of good-fortune, prosperity and great wealth. The lords of the 2nd and the 11th in favourable association with Jupiter make one very wealthy. The association of the bhava-lord and the bhava-karaka is essential in any yoga-formation for the sake of bringing out the best results signified by that bhava, both should be vested with requisite strength and be unafflicted. Moreover, a strong benefic planet occupying its exaltation sign in any one of the afore-stated bhavas makes one rich and prosperous. Ramanuja in his Bhavartha Ratnakara affirms that an exalted planet situated in the 5th or in the 9th house makes one exceptionally fortunate and famous; exalted planets promote the significances of the bhava they happen to occupy. Jataka Tattva states that first find out in which drekkena the lords of the 2nd and the 11th are placed, then find out the lords of the navamsas that are occupied by the lords of those drekkenas, if the lords of these navamsas attain Vaisheshikamsa and occupy the kendras or the trikonas then the person will be blessed with a very sound financial status, be wealthy and helpful to others.

If the lagna-lord and the lord of the 2nd house combine with a benefic planet and their dispositor strong and unafflicted occupies the lagna one becomes wealthy late in life. If the lords of the lagna and the 2nd house are involved in mutual exchange of signs one acquires wealth effortlessly. If more than one planet tenants the 2nd house from the lagna (or the Moon) and the lords of the 2nd and the 11th bhavas are strong and occupy their exaltation signs one earns/acquires immense wealth and leads a rich easy comfortable life throughout. But, the lord of the 11th house from the lagna relegated to a trika bhava or either the lord of the 11th or the lord of the 12th situated in the 8th house devoid of benefic influences indicates bankruptcy.

Mansagari tells us that either the lord of the lagna situated in the lagna or the Moon conjoining with Mars gives steady wealth and keep one always above want but papagrahas in the 2nd house or cruel planets in the 2nd and also in the kendras give poverty, whereas auspicious planets in the 2nd house confer financial prosperity. Janardan Harji further states that Mars situated in the 8th and /or the Sun in Libra in a trikona certainly make one a pauper and even beg for alms.
