= Trikonasthanas =

Concept in Hindu astrology

Trikonasthanas or trikonas or trines are conventionally the Lagna or the Birth-ascendant, the fifth and the ninth bhava or house counted from the Lagna (or the Chandra-lagna or the Surya-lagna). They form the Dharma-trikona and are also known as the Lakshmisthanas, these bhavas and their lords signify luck and prosperity. The Lagna is both, a kendrasthana and a trikonasthana.

== Overview ==
The Lagna (Ascendant) is the exact point marked by the eastern horizon on the zodiac-belt that seemingly encircles the Earth; it is the point where the ecliptic cuts the horizon in the East. Hindu astrology, which is primarily based on constellations or nakshatras and on the equal house division, follows the Sidereal or the fixed zodiac. The entire sign or rasi rising in the east at the given local mean-time of birth or query is the first house or the Lagna. With the Rasi-chakra moving towards the East the count of signs or houses is from the eastern horizon, and their duration differs from latitude to latitude. The longitudes of the houses (bhava-sphutas), oblique ascensions (rasimanas) and other calculations are all computed for Sayana Rasis or signs, from these the Ayanamsa is subtracted and the Nirayana bhavas, etc., are obtained. The Ayanamsa is the distance between the Hindu first point of the Zodiac i.e. Zero degree Aries, and the Vernal Equinox, measured at an epoch.

There are four sets of trikonasthanas (Trines). The first set comprises the 1st house or the lagna, the 5th house (which is also a succedent house or a panapara) and the 9th house (which is also a cadent house or an apoklima), which three are the trinal houses of righteousness and form the Dharma-trikona. The second set comprises the 2nd house (which is a succeedent house), the 6th house (which is a cadent house and an upachayasthana) and the 10th house (which is a quadrant i.e. a kendra, and an upachayasthana), which three are the trinal houses for material possessions and form the Artha-trikona. The third set comprises the 3rd house (which is a cadent house and an upachayasthana), the 7th house (which is a quadrant or a kendra) and the 11th house (which is a succeedent house and an upachayasthana), which are the trinal houses for sensual enjoyments and form the Kama-trikona. The fourth set comprises the 4th house (which is a quadrant or a kendra), the 8th house (which is a succeedent house) and the 12th house (which is a cadent house), which three are the trinal houses for final emancipation and form the Moksha-trikona. These are mathematically determined by dividing the whole circle of 360 degrees into three divisions beginning from the point of the rising lagna, the scheme which is also followed in the arrangement of twenty seven nakshatras into three sets of nine each beginning from the Janma-nakshtra succeeded by Sampat, Vipat, Khshemya, Pratwara, Sadhaka, Naidhana, Maitra and Parama-maitra.

== Implication ==
The 1st house, the 5th house and the 9th house forming a triangle relative to the Ascendant and known as the Dharma-trikonas are auspicious bhavas wherein situated planets gain strength, the benefic planets become more benefic and the malefic planets tend to give good results. The lords of these trikonasthanas are auspicious lords.

According to the texts the 5th and the 9th house from the Lagna or the Chandra-lagna alone are the trikonasthanas – dharmatmajo trikono - Jataka Tattva (Sutra I.26). From the 5th house are to be adjudged one’s mind, intelligence and discretion, inclination and talent, education, progeny, good counsel, good conduct, organising ability, emotions and feelings, desired objectives and actions in pursuance thereof, retentive memory, imagination, attitude of mind, pregnancy, law and principles, father, heart, stomach and hunger, insignia of royalty, fall from kingship or high office, shastras, religion, worship of devatas, faith and belief. Jupiter is the karaka (significator) of the 5th house. From the 9th house are to be judged one’s Dharma, righteousness, intuition, sympathy, leadership, fame, the religious preceptor, religious austerities, general prosperity, alms and charities, acts of religious merits, fortune, efforts for acquisition of learning, all kinds of wealth, investments, long journeys, father and grandchildren. The Sun is the karaka of father and the 9th house. These two bhavas complement each other and their significations are to be judged also from the navamsa-chart.

Auspicious i.e. signs owned by the Moon, Mercury, Venus and Jupiter such as Taurus, Gemini, Cancer, Virgo, Libra, Sagittarius and Pisces, should preferably form the trikonasthanas, they should then be occupied or aspected by either their own strong lord or a strong friendly benefic planet. An exalted planet occupying any one of these bhavas indicates exceptional good fortune; the Moon becomes exalted in Taurus, Jupiter in Cancer, Mercury in Virgo, Saturn in Libra and Venus in Pisces sign. Natural malefics situated herein tend to destroy the good signified by these bhavas. Mars situated in the 5th house generally gives a miserable domestic life, misfortunes through children and ill-health, whereas Saturn gives an evil mind, stupidity, illness, poverty, sorrow through children, variable fortune etc. Rahu though equally unfavourable makes one hard-hearted and unconventional, and Ketu, while proving bad in effects, gives one inclination towards spirituality. Mars situated in the 9th house makes one wield power and authority, be generous, become renowned for good qualities, affluent and happy but does not make one a dutiful son; Saturn makes one lead a lonely life and probably no marriage; Rahu makes one impolite and miserly, gives fame and wealth but a nagging and domineering wife, and Ketu makes one eloquent but short-tempered, haughty and bad in conduct. The Sun occupying the 5th house makes one impatient and intelligent but devoid of domestic peace and happiness, poor and short-lived, and when occupying the 9th house it gives enmity with spouse and much unhappiness.

The kendrasthanas or the quadrants and the trikonasthanas or the trines not occupied by taragrahas (the seven visible planets) indicate a turbulent life; the chayagrahas (the invisible Lunar Nodes) alone tenanting the kendrasthanas cause immense pain. The lord of the 9th house is deemed to be a benefic at par with the lord of the lagna, if it happens to occupy a trikasthana i.e. the 6th, the 8th or the 12th house which are inauspicious bhavas, the person will not be fortunate. Only those planets that are in the 9th house in conjunction with Mercury can give rise to Raja yoga and confer a position of power and authority but if they are devoid of any association with Mercury and Jupiter they do not make one fortunate and the person leads an ordinary life. The lords of inauspicious bhavas tend to act as benefic planets when situated in the 9th house or in the 5th, the lords of the 8th and the 12th conjoining in the 9th or in the 5th give good results, in which event the lord of the 12th makes one rich and fortunate. Natural benefics situated in the 12th house protect one’s wealth. Three or more planets, including Mercury and Jupiter, occupying the 9th house make one wealthy, and a strong lord of the 9th occupying a kendra or a trikona aspected by the lord of the lagna makes one very fortunate.

== Impact of weak and afflicted planets ==
Weak and afflicted planets situated in the trikonasthanas produce bad results; they can make one’s life miserable and even cause Balarishta. If the Moon occupies the last navamsa of the sign and malefic planets are in the 5th and 9th without beneficial aspects the child dies immediately. If Saturn, the Sun, the Moon and Mars occupy the 12th, the 9th, the lagna and the 8th bhavas respectively unaspected by powerful Jupiter the child dies quickly. Whereas Varahamihira reiterates that if the Moon conjoining with a malefic planet or malefic planets occupies the 5th, the 7th, the 9th, the 12th, the 1st or the 8th houses and is not aspected by or combined with powerful Venus, Mercury or Jupiter death comes early; Kalyan Verma refers to the very weak dark-half Moon producing this result. Planets occupying the 9th house in the absence of Mercury and Jupiter cannot be considered strong even if occupying their own sign, exaltation sign or friendly sign. According to Kalyan Verma three or more planets conjoining with Mercury in the 9th house make one trustworthy, rich and a ruler but if the 9th house is occupied by planets other than Mercury and Jupiter they make one suffer from physical ailments, be unattractive in appearance, inhuman and mean, and even suffer incarceration.

== Impact of cruel planets ==
Saturn or Mars or the Sun otherwise occupying or aspecting the 9th house do not tend to give good results but they can give rise to Raja yoga or confer much wealth. Jataka Parijata (Sloka VII.4) states that Raja yoga arises if strong benefics are situated in the lagna, the 7th and the 10th, and Mars and Saturn are in the 9th and the 11th. Saravali (Sloka XXXV.95) states that Raja yoga arises in case strong benefics are in the lagna, the 4th and the 7th and the Sun, Mars and Saturn are in the 3rd, 9th and the 11th house. Jataka Parijata (Sloka VII.12) states that the Sun in the 3rd, the Moon in the 9th and Jupiter in the 5th, all vested with strength, make one powerful and very rich. Saravali (Sloka XXXV.168) states that similar would be the result if from Mars, Jupiter, the Moon and the Sun happen to occupy the 5th, the 9th and the 3rd bhavas in any order avoiding debilitation signs and navamsas. Vaidyanatha states that the son born during the antar-dasa of the lord of the 5th house conjoining with Rahu will be short-lived but the son born during the antar-dasa of Rahu will live long.
