= Rashmi (Hindu astrology) =

Sighting of light in a day in Hindu astrology

In Hindu astrology, Rashmi means the very first ray of light.

There is also a reference to a Ketu (Comet) by name 'Rasmi' in Brihat Samhita of Varahamihira with commentary by Bhattotpala (Sloka 40, Chapter XI, page 158). It describes that this Comet Rasmi Ketu makes itself visible by its ashy-coloured crest.

== Etymology ==
Rashmi (Sanskrit: रश्मि) meaning "The very first ray of light", beam, string, rope, ray of hope, splendour, rein, leash, whip, goad, and food, but this term is generally associated with the solar rays even though all burning objects are luminescent and emit light-rays.)

== Overview ==
All planets in the Solar System and the Moon bask in the glory of the brightly burning Sun; they are seen to shine because they are constantly reflecting in all directions the solar rays they receive which are actually energy-beams. These rashmis or light-rays, the electromagnetic radiation, which have a direct impact on the lives of all living beings on earth. One of many names of Sun in Sanskrit is "Rashmi Rathi".

== Calculation of Rashmi bala or strength ==
The effect of the solar rays reflected by these heavenly bodies on to the earth gets modified according to the kind and nature of the particular rasi or astrological sign covered by them during the course of their transits, i.e. orbital motion round the Sun. Thus, when it is in deep exaltation, the Sun emits rashmis or light-rays of maximum strength–value of 10, the Moon, of 9, Mars of 5, Mercury of 5, Jupiter of 7, Venus of 8 and Saturn of 5 units, and when in deep debilitation their rashmi-strength is 0 unit.

According to the method described by Parasara in his Brihat Parasara Hora Shastra, the rashmi–strength for each of their intervening positions is to be calculated on pro–rata basis, which value would decrease or increase as they move towards or away from their point of deep debilitation. If the planet is in its sign of exaltation the rashmi–value initially arrived at is to be trebled; in its Moolatrikona sign, it is to be doubled, and in own sign to be multiplied by two and divided by two; in its intimate friend's sign to be multiplied by four and divided by three and in a friendly sign it is to be multiplied by six and divided by five, if in an inimical sign the rashmi–value originally arrived at is to be halved, in the sign of a bitter–foe the original rashmi–value should be multiplied by two and divided by five but no correction is to be made when the planet is in a neutral sign. The corrected rashmi–value of each of the seven astrological planets barring the Lunar-nodes is then to be totalled.

Janardan Harji in the section of Mansagari devoted to the effects of Rashmi-bala states that in case the planet is in its exaltation sign, the rashmi-value gained by a planet is to be trebled, if it is in its own sign or dwadasamsa or intimate friends sign the said value is to be doubled, if it is debilitated then the value is to be reduced by 1/16th and if it is debilitated but in retrograde motion the rashmi-value gained is to be doubled.

== Effect ==
Parasara tells us that the person, even if born in a well-to-do family, will remain poor and unhappy if collectively the rashmi–value is five or less than five, if the sum total of rashmis contributed by all planets at the time of birth is between six and ten, the person will be poor and a manual labourer without wife and children. A person blessed with eleven rashmis will have meagre wealth and few children; with twelve rashmis possess meagre wealth but will be wicked and an idiot; with thirteen rashmis the person will be a thief; with fourteen rashmis the person will be wealthy, learned and have a family; with fifteen rashmis the person will possess good qualities, be head of family and proficient; with sixteen rashmis most distinguished in the family; with seventeen rashmis an employer of many; with eighteen rashmis one has and maintains a large family; with nineteen rashmis earns a good reputation and becomes well-known; with twenty rashmis, blessed with a large family and many relatives; with twenty-one rashmis, maintains and protects fifty people; with twenty-two rashmis, very charitable and kind; with twenty-three rashmis well-cultured and happy, and if the total rashmis are between twenty-four and thirty the person will be healthy, powerful, well-connected and rich. The person blessed with rashmis aggregating between thirty-one and forty will be a high official or a minister supporting one hundred to a thousand persons, between forty-one and fifty rashmis the person will be a ruler or a king, and with more than fifty rashmis the person will be the all-powerful ruler of men.

With regard to the afore-stated results, Parasara qualifies that these will hold true according to the conditions and family status of the person at birth, and according to the particular signs distance-wise from the deep debilitation point etc.; occupied by the planets – that the effects of planets moving from their debilitation to exaltation will be full, otherwise it will be less and less. He declares that correct predictions cannot be made without taking into account the collective rashmi-bala of all planets and their effects.

Janardan Harji states that if the sum total of the rashmis thus gained is between one and five, the person will be unhappy, devoid of family, troubled, wicked, poor and bad in speech and conduct; if that sum total is between six and ten rashmis, the person will be not have any relatives and helpful friends, will reside abroad or far away from place of birth, be unfortunate and slovenly; if between eleven and fifteen rashmis, the person will be a chief, respected, happy, head of family and a dharmatma; between sixteen and twenty rashmis, the person will be a much praised dignitary and occupy a high official post; if between twenty-one and twenty-five rashmis, the person will possess a radiant and powerful personality, be courageous, learned, brave, successful and renowned; if between twenty-five and thirty rashmis, the person will gain support from the high and powerful quarters, hold an important and trustworthy position or become a close adviser or a minister; between thirty-one and thirty- seven rashmis, progressively graded, the person will be wealthy holding a very important commanding position or a ruler; and if the total rashmis gained exceed thirty-seven, the person will become a king or ruler more powerful and influential the more rashmis are gained. The low or high status in one's life depends on the lesser or the greater number of rashmis gained at the time of birth; similarly on the basis of the lesser or greater number of rashmis gained at the time of death can be known the Adhamagati or the Madhyamagati or the Uttamagati attained by the deceased.

If at the time of query malefic planets endowed with more rashmi-bala are in the 6th, the 8th and the 12th or aspect these bhavas the ailing person will not survive but if benefic planets are similarly placed the patient will survive.
