= Nabhasa yoga =

Placement of planets in Hindu astrology

Nābhāsa yoga (Sanskrit: नाभास) refers to the different arrangements of all seven of the planets in the celestial realm in Hindu astrology.

The Sanskrit word nābhāsa can be variously translated as "celestial," "heavenly" or "appearing in the sky."

== Overview ==
The names of the Nābhāsa yogas depend on the shape formed by the seven planets (the two Lunar-nodes which are invisible mathematical points are not connected with this scheme). The Nābhāsa yogas are planetary configurations which give an overall view of a person's life; they indicate the pattern of life, inclinations, strong points and weaknesses, and are not dependent upon planetary lordships, conjunctions and aspects etc. Their results are felt throughout one's lifetime irrespective of the dashas in operation.

== Basic constitution ==
Nābhāsa yogas are of four kinds, they are known as 1) the Akrati (Sanskrit: आकृति) (diagrammatical i.e. in definite geometric patterns) yogas, 2) the Sankhya (Sanskrit: संख्या) (numerical i.e. based on number of rasis and not bhavas occupied by seven planets) yogas, 3) the Asraya (Sanskrit: आश्रय) (positional i.e. based on the basic nature of signs occupied by planets) yogas and 4) the Dala (Sanskrit: दल) (bilateral i.e. based on the nature of bhavas occupied by planets other than the Moon) yogas. If Asraya and Sankhya yogas co-exist the former will prevail, and in the case of Dala yogas the Moon is not taken into consideration. Sankhya yogas are applicable only if no other Nabhasa yoga is simultaneously obtained. These yogas are generally ignored. The ancient Yavanas had described 1800 Nābhāsa yogas (23 Akriti yogas + 127 Sankhya yogas per lagna x 12 = 1800, they did not take into account the 3 Asraya and the 2 Dala yogas possible for each lagna) but according to Suchidhwaja they are unlimited. B.Suryanarain Rao in his commentary on Chapter XII of Varahamihira’s Brihat Jataka writes that one should be careful in adjusting the results of these yogas. Varahamihira in St.12 states that Asraya yogas when they join others become useless then the others give results, only when the Asraya yogas are free that they give their own results. The Dala yogas may coincide with Sankhya yogas but not with Akrati and Asraya yogas. One of the Sankhya yogas is bound to occur in every horoscope.

== Classification ==
Parasara in his Brihat Parasara Hora shastra has described thirty-two varieties of Nābhāsa yogas i.e. the three Asraya yogas – Rajju, Musala and Nala; the two Dala yogas – Mala and Sarpa; the twenty Akriti yogas – Gada, Shakata, Shringataka, Vihaga, Hala, Vajra, Yava, Kamala, Vapi, Yoopa, Shara, Shakti, Danda, Nauka, Koota, Chhatra, Dhanusha, Ardhachandra, Chakra and Samudra; and the six Sankhya yogas – Dama, Pasa, Kedara, Shoolaa, Yuga and Gola yoga.

The Asraya yogas, propounded by Manitha, are based on all seven planets simultaneously occupying moveable or fixed or common signs; Rajju yoga arises if all seven planets occupy moveable signs, Musala yoga arises when they occupy fixed signs, and Nala yoga if they are all in common signs. The unfavourable Sarpa yoga arises if the Sun, Mars and Saturn occupy mutual kendras from the lagna, and the favourable Mala yoga if Mercury, Venus and Jupiter are similarly placed; these are the two Dala yogas.

Gada yoga is formed by all seven planets occupying the lagna and the 4th, the 4th and the 7th the 7th and the 10th and the 10th and the lagna; when they are in the lagna and the 7th Shakata yoga arises; if they are in the 4th and the 10th, the Vihaga yoga; if they are in the lagna, the 5th and the 9th, Shringataka yoga is caused; if in mutual trines involving a kendra, the Hala yoga. When all benefic planets are in the lagna and the 7th or when malefic planets occupy the 4th and the 10th house, the Vajra yoga is caused but if the benefic planets are in the 4th and the 10th and the malefic planets are in the lagna and the 7th then Yava yoga is caused. All seven planets distributed in the four kendras give rise to the Kamala yoga; if they are in the Panaparas or the Apoklimas, then to the Vapi yoga. All seven planets in four bhavas from lagna to the 4th, from 4th to the 7th, from 7th to the 10th and from 10th to the lagna give rise to the Yoopa yoga, the Shara yoga, the Shakti yoga and the Danda yoga. If all planets occupy all seven bhavas from the lagna to the 7th, then Nauka yoga arises; and from the 4th to the 7th, the Koota yoga. If all seven planets happen to occupy the 7th to the lagna, the Chhatra yoga; from the 10th to the 4th, the Dhanusha yoga, and from the 2nd to the 8th, the Ardhachandra yoga arises. If the seven planets are in odd bhavas counted from the lagna, the Chakra yoga is caused; if in even bhavas, the Samudra yoga. These are the Akriti yogas.

All seven planets occupying one bhava causes the Gola yoga; in two bhavas, the Yuga yoga, in three bhavas, the Shoola yoga, in four bhavas, the Kedara yoga, in five bhavas, the Pasa yoga, or in six bhavas the Dama or Damini yoga. These are the Sankhya yogas. All seven planets situated in seven bhavas is known as the Veena yoga.

== Yoga-effects ==
Kalyan Varma in his Saravali states that the person born in Asraya yoga will be blessed with happiness, several advantages and qualities provided there is no other Nābhāsa yoga present in the birth-chart. One born in Akriti yoga will be fortunate, a favourite of and supported by highly placed superiors and famous. One born in Sankhya yoga is happy only with others’ wealth, lives through others’ help but not peacefully. One born in Dala yoga sometimes enjoys own fortune and sometimes of others’, and is sometimes happy and other times sorrowful.
