= Planetary dispositors (Hindu astrology) =

Planetary dispositors play an important role in Astrology. A dispositor is a planet that rules the sign that another planet is located in. For example, if Venus is in Gemini, then Mercury is the dispositor of Venus.

== Dispositor ==
The dispositor is the planet which is the ruler of the sign or house that is occupied by another sign or house lord. Western astrology looks upon planetary dispositors as the final response to the meaning of an aspect in a horoscope, and it prefers drawing up of Dispositor trees that assist in determining in the Natal Chart the temporal status and the active nature of all planets.

The concept of Planetary dispositors is not new to Hindu astrology, the ancient Hindu texts on Hindu predictive astrology have described numerous yogas based on this principle. In fact, most yogas are dependent upon the benefic placement of the dispositors of the planets giving rise to those yogas. In Hindu astrology the Planetary dispositor is also known as the Poshaka, meaning the "Nourisher", because it tends to aid the occupant of its sign or house.

== Dispositor’s role ==
Whether the planet occupying a particular sign and bhava will act as a benefic or a malefic also depends upon its dispositor acting as a benefic or a malefic. If the sign and the navamsa of the dispositor are both strong then they add to the strength of the resident planet. The result of the aspect of the dispositor on its own occupied sign or house or on any other planet depends upon its own basic nature, and its acquired strength and qualities. Dispositors tend to give results of planets which are occupying their signs, they carry the tendencies of those planets. The Sun. Saturn, Rahu and the lord of 12th house possess separatist tendencies (in respect of marriage, partnership etc.;), their dispositor will also carry the same separatist tendencies where ever it be situated, the role of dispositors in conjunctions and aspects is important and cannot be ignored.

The status acquired by dispositors of Sahams, the sensitive points, in the Varshaphala charts is equally important . The Saham that is aspected by its dispositor or a benefic prospers or if the dispositor aspects the lagna, but not so when the aspecting planet is itself weak in strength or occupies the 6th, the 8th, or the 12th house.

== Dispositor’s influence ==
The signs the planets happen to occupy are vital for determining friendship between planets and their dispositors.

When no planet occupies its own sign then all planets so placed create a continuous flow of energy from one to the other. In the formation of Dhvaja yoga each of the seven planets (Rahu and Ketu excluded) strong and alone are in another’s sign, with one of them situated in the Lagna.

In the case of sthanaparivartana (mutual exchange of signs) that gives rise to a powerful yoga, two dispositors arise who then act as partners, which one is stronger depends upon their individual Awastha.

Particularly in the case of the two lunar nodes, Rahu and Ketu, if the dispositor is strong and unafflicted then good results can be expected; the lunar nodes give results according to the nature and disposition of the lord of the sign and the house they occupy. Moreover, if the dispositor of either Rahu or Ketu does not own an evil house i.e. the 6th, the 8th or the 12th; or is not a functional malefic by virtue of owning the 3rd or the 11th and is a benefic for the ascendant then these two Chaya grahas give good results.

The dispositor governs the planet that happens to occupy its sign, a) by becoming the sahayogi (partner) of that yogi (whose dispositor it is), and b) by acting as a proxy for the latter. Take the case of the formation of Pushkala yoga the lord of the sign occupied by the Moon associated with the Lagna, occupies a kendra or is in the house of an intimate friend, and the Lagna is also occupied by a powerful planet, in which event the dispositor of the Moon adds strength to the Moon and through the Moon to the Lagna. Sreenatha yoga arises when the exalted lord of the 7th house occupies the 10th and the lord of the 10th joins the lord of the 9th in the 10th house thereby favourably strengthening and exciting the 9th and the 10th bhavas/houses. If the lord of the sign occupied by the debilitated planet is in a kendra position from the Moon or the Lagna or if the lord of the sign occupied by the debilitated planet aspects that debilitated planet, Neechabhanga Raja yoga arises.

The dispositor of the lord of the navamsa occupied by any planet too plays a pivotal role in yoga-formations. In the case of the formation of the favourable Gauri yoga the lord of the navamsa occupied by the lord of the 10th should be exalted in the 10th combined with the lord of the Lagna, and in the case of equally favourable Bharati yoga the lord of the navamsa occupied by the lords of the 2nd, 5th and the 11th should be exalted and combine with the lord of the 9th. Parijata yoga, also known as Kalpadrum yoga, arises if the dispositor of the lord of lagna and the dispositor of the dispositor or the lords of the navamsas occupied by these two, attain exaltation either in a kendra or a trikona.
