= Upachayasthanas =

The term Upachayasthana is derived from the Sanskrit word उपचय which means increase, it also means the entire process of acquisition, assimilation and augmentation or proximate aggregation or increase or gain of nourishment or in growth or in body weight.

In Hindu astrology the 3rd, the 6th, the 10th and the 11th bhavas or houses counted from the Lagna or the Moon are known as the Upachayasthanas, they are known as the houses of growth and expansion.

== Overview ==
B. Suryanarain Rao in his commentary on Brihat Jataka states that the 3rd, the 6th, the 10th and the 11th bhavas are termed upachayas for their power of improving men’s fortune. Amongst these four bhavas the 6th house is simultaneously an apoklima, an upachayasthana and a dustasthana but it is not as bad as the 8th and 12th. The 3rd, the 6th, and the 11th bhavas are also known as the houses of resistance to disease and relate to immune system; malefic planets situated therein tend to destroy diseases and increase immunity. Benefic planets occupying the 6th house do not confer good results but are not bad when situated in the 3rd or the 11th.

== Implications ==
Upachayasthanas, which are houses of growth and expansion, confer good or bad results according to the nature of the planets occupying them; benefic planets situated therein generally help one earn and accumulate riches. Malefic planets occupying the upachayasthanas give gains not without physical struggles and anxiety, whereas benefic planets give gains with less physical struggle and more yield. Planets that own the 3rd, the 6th, or the 11th bhava are deemed malefics. Malefic planets occupying the upachayasthanas cause struggle, effort and eventual success.

== Vasumathi yoga ==
If (at the time of one’s birth) benefic planets occupy the upachayasthanas (the 3rd, the 6th, the 10th and the 11th bhavas ) either from the Lagna or the Moon then Vasumathi yoga arises whose results are that the person will not be a dependent but will always command plenty of wealth; this yoga is more effective with reference to the Lagna because counted from the Moon only three upachaysthanas can be occupied by benefic planets Mercury, Venus and Jupiter. Planets occupying their exaltation signs will make this yoga more powerful but by occupying their debilitation signs, weak. A pure Vasumathi yoga is a rare occurrence.

== Impact ==
The Sun or the Moon situated in the 11th house from the lagna destroys one crore doshas says Garga, they make one exceptionally fortunate. The exalted Sun situated in the 11th house makes a person a principal official in the service of a ruler; possess many good qualities, disciplined, long-lived, powerful and blessed with comforts but rebellious and hard-hearted. A Raja yoga will arise if the exalted Sun in the 11th house is aspected by an exalted Jupiter from the 3rd house and an exalted Venus combines with Mercury in the 10th house. Saturn as the lord of the 9th situated in the 11th house in its sign of debilitation may confer yoga but will not advance the affairs of the auspicious bhavas it owns. If the Moon is in the 11th house it should be strong in pakshabala which ever sign it occupies.

With regard to the query - 'Whether business-related work will be achieved?' – it will be achieved when the lord of lagna becomes the lord of year, month, day and hora i.e. hour, and transits an upachayasthana or when a friendly planet transits an upachayasthana counted from the house occupied by the lord of the lagna at birth or at the time of query or transits its own nakshatra, sign or navamsa of exaltation. In this regard Prasna Marga says that the lord of lagna or the strongest planet occupying the upachayasthana or lagna or kendras gives the same result on the respective weekdays or at the time of their Kala Hora.

When at the commencement of the dasa of a planet if that planet is in its exaltation, own or friendly sign or in an upachayasthana from the lagna or receives aspect of friendly benefics then good results will ensue during the course of its dasa or if at the start of dasa the pakshabali Moon transits the exaltation own or friendly sign of dasa lord in upachayasthana or trikona or 7th from dasa-lord. The lords of the 3rd, the 6th and the 11th bhavas do not give good results in their respective dasa-bhukti. Benefic planets occupying these houses give happiness during childhood and malefic planets give happiness in old age.
