= Sarvartha Chintamani =

Hindu astrological text

- Author: Venkatesa Sarma
- Language: Sanskrit
- Subject: Astrology
- Publication place: India

Sarvartha Chintamani is one of the important books of astrology belonging to ancient India. Written in Sanskrit verse it deals with the effects of each house in the natal chart in far greater detail besides giving the description about the planets, their effects, lifespan and prosperity. However, it makes a clear distinction between benefic and malefic indications and their impact, although that distinction may be prima facie indicating contrary results.

== Details ==
Sarvatha Chintamani, meaning the Gem of superior desires or thoughts, is believed to have been written by Venkatesa Sarma in the 13th century; it is one of the most important and most cited astrological works particularly on the description of yoga-formation of planets and the results of those yogas. In the Introductory note to his translation of this Sanskrit text J.N.Bhasin writes that Sarvartha Chintamani is one of the top astrolological works. It also provides practical and very valuable comments on the subjects relating to the 12 houses of the birth-chart; in doing so it follows the unique and distinct procedure whereby the main subject or objects pertaining to a house are first of all stated in the very beginning of the concerned section and then astrologically explained on the basis of the house concerned, its lord and its significator, and the results, good or bad, declared. B.Suryanarayan writes that whereas Varahamihira dealt with Karmajeeva Adhyaya in merely four verses Venkatesa, on the other hand, in his Savartha Chintamani, expands Varahamihira's observation on this subject which is of paramount importance to all men.

== Chapters ==
This important text covers the entire wide ambit of Predictive astrology.

- Chapter 1: Rasi Vichar – This chapter deals with the various definitions and elementary principles;
- Chapter 2: Lagna phal Vichar – This chapter deals with the results of the signs rising in the ascendant at the time of birth, physical appearance, scars, happiness and grief, etc;
- Chapter 3: Consideration and results of 2nd house i.e. of matters pertaining to nature and kind of wealth gained and accumulated;
- Chapter 4: Consideration and results of 3rd and 4th houses i.e. matters pertaining to siblings, servants or employees, bravery, friends, residences and house property, general and domestic happiness, mother, etc;
- Chapter 5: Consideration and results of 5th and 6th houses i.e. of matters pertaining to intelligence, education, knowledge, pregnancy, birth of children, enmity and enemies, evil deeds, diseases, maternal relations, etc;
- Chapter 6: Consideration and results of 7th house i.e. of matters pertaining to battles and conflicts, trade and partnerships, marriage, journeys, etc;
- Chapter 7: Consideration and results of 8th and 9th houses i.e. of matters pertaining to travels overseas, obstacles in journeys, span of life, calamities, faith and beliefs, fortune, good conduct, pilgrimage, etc;
- Chapter 8: Consideration and results of 10th, 11th and 12th houses i.e. of matters pertaining to father, exceptional capabilities, modes of earning a livelihood, royal honours, gain of kingdom and ruling powers, gains, loss, charity, expenditure, punishment, incarceration, etc;
- Chapter 9: Raja yogas i.e. of matters pertaining to formation of and results of planetary combinations indicating gain and exercise of ruling powers, etc;
- Chapter 10: Longevity or span of life i.e. of matters pertaining to determination of span of life, etc;
- Chapter 11: Arishtabhanga or cancellation of yogas indicating short life i.e. of matters pertaining to planetary combinations occurring simultaneously ruling out early death;
- Chapter 12: Madhya Ayu or Medium span of life;
- Chapter 13: Dashas of the Sun and the Moon i.e. of matters pertaining to calculation and timing, results thereof;
- Chapter 14: Dashas of Mars and Mercury i.e. of matters pertaining to calculation and timing, results thereof;
- Chapter 15: Dashas of Jupiter, Venus and Saturn i.e. of matters pertaining to calculation and timing, results thereof;
- Chapter 16: Dashas of Rahu and Ketu, and antra dashas i.e. of matters pertaining to calculation and timing, results thereof;
- Chapter 17: Miscellaneous matters.
