= Laghu Parashari =

Hindu astrology of periods of life

- Author: Unknown
- Language: Sanskrit
- Subject: Astrology
- Genre: Parashari School of Hindu astrology
- Publication place: India

Laghu Parashari, also known as Jataka Chandrika, is an important treatise on Vimshottari dasha system and is based on Bṛhat Parāśara Horāśāstra. Written in Sanskrit in the usual Sloka format, it consists of forty-two verses divided into five chapters. Thus, it is a brief but an important treatise on predictive part of Hindu astrology whose authorship is not known even though it is presumed that it was written by ardent followers of Parashara. It contains all the fundamental principles on which the Parashari system is based. It is widely relied upon by the exponents of Hindu astrology and a text that is frequently cited.
