= Jataka Tattva =

Standard predictive Hindu astrology text

- Author: Mahadeva
- Language: Sanskrit
- Subject: Astrology
- Publication place: India

Jataka Tattva is a standard treatise on the predictive part of Hindu astrology and follows the Parashari System. It is written in Sanskrit. Its author has adopted the Sutra method for imparting knowledge of astrology instead of the traditional Sloka format. A great deal of importance is given to Medicine and Astrology. The author of this text, Mahadeva, son of Revashankar Pathak, hailed from Ratlam, Rajasthan, he was a devotee of Goddess Parvati, the consort of Lord Shiva and well-versed in medicine, Sanskrit and Jyotisha. Mahadeva is believed to have lived from 1842 to 1888. He had written this treatise with the assistance of Vishnushastri, and completed its writing on Phalguna Shukla Panchami Vikram Samvat 1928 (on 14 March 1874). The brevity of the sutras employed to describe lengthy original passages culled from other texts is noteworthy. His son, Shriniwas Mahadeva Sharma translated this text into Hindi which translation with commentary was published in 1913. The earliest translation of this text into English appears to be that of V.Subramanya Sastri which was published in 1941 by V.B.Soobbiah and Sons, Bangalore.

Jataka Tattva comprises five tatvas or sections, namely, Samjna, Sutika, Prakirna, Strijataka, and Dasha. These five then are further divided into 13 sub-sections. Some say it can be used to diagnose medical ailments, in addition to reading the dasha effects. In his book titled - Light on Life: An introduction to the Astrology of India, Hart de Fouw has cited Jataka Tattva
