= Trikona =

Triangular symbol used in Hindu yantra

The six-pointed shatkona

Trikona is a Sanskrit word which signifies a triangle and is one of the widely used mythical geometric symbol. It is used to assist in meditation, and in different yantras. Different positions of trikona (triangle) are believed to impart different types of properties and attributes to the symbol. Such properties and attributes include the following:

- tri means "three" and "kon" means angle. Trikon literally translates to triangle and not to equilateral triangle
- A trkona, which points upward, indicates agni, linga and purusha.
- A trkona, which points downward, indicates water, yoni and prakriti.
- In another configuration, two trkonas are depicted interpenetrating each other and one points upwards while the second points downwards. This symbolized purusha and prakriti.
- When trikonas are united in such a way that they form a six-pointed star, they represent creative activity from which the cosmos springs forth.
- When a circle surrounds a hexagonal figure, it is symbolic of revolving time, in which purusha and prakriti manifest themselves in the form of creation. The hexagon is also used in Shakti cult.
- When the trikonas are represented in a disjointed manner and separated from each other, they symbolize the cession of time and the cosmos ceases to exist.

It is also used to describe astrological houses located in a triangular relationship to one another in Vedic astrology e.g.: the first house, the fifth house and ninth house, which are all 120 degrees from one another.

== See also ==
- Yantra
