= Dasha (astrology) =

Ruling period of a planet set into sub-periods

Dasha (Devanagari: दशा, Sanskrit, daśā, 'condition', 'state', 'circumstances', 'period of life', 'planetary period'.) The dasha pattern shows which planets according to Hindu astrology would be ruling at particular times.

== Overview ==
The Sanskrit term "dasha" in Hindu astrology is used to indicate planetary periods. The planetary periods indicate when the good or bad effects are produced according to their placement by sign (Rasi), house (Bhava), combinations (Yogas or Raja Yogas) or aspects (Drishti). The Dasha Paddhati (system) of Directional Astrology is unique to the Hindus; it is found nowhere else. There are many kinds of Dasha systems, Parashara mentions forty-two of them, but of these only two are in vogue, namely, "Vimshottari" and "Ashtottari". Dashas provide a system to judge the effects of the planets throughout a person's life, by indicating how the planets distribute their effects. Each dasha is controlled by one of the nine planets, and the quality and relative benevolence of each period is determined by the condition and position of that planet in the natal chart. There are nine planets or grahas which severally rule the nine dashas: the seven classical planets, plus the north node, Rahu, and south node, Ketu, of the Moon.

There are at least 43 different dasha systems. "Dasha" is the major period of a planet. It is called the "Poorna Dasha" if the planet is the most powerful or is in its sign of exaltation, which dasha gives health and wealth; the dasha of a powerless planet is called the "Rikta dasha", "Rikta" means poor or devoid of any power. Varahamihira explains that the dasha of the planet occupying unfriendly sign and navamsa will produce Aristaphala i.e. undesirable or miserable results; the planet that has fallen from exaltation but is in friendly or exalted navamsa gives ordinary results, and the planet that is ascending from debilitation but is in debilitated or unfriendly navamsa, gives a worthless period.

== Vimshottari Dasha ==
Vimshottari in Sanskrit stands for the number 120. Vimshottari Dasha assumes that the maximum duration of life of an individual human being is 120 Solar sidereal years which is the aggregate duration of all nine planetary periods i.e. Ketu 7, Venus 20, Sun 6, Moon 10, Mars 7, Rahu 18, Jupiter 16, Saturn 19 and Mercury 17, in the order of their operation. It is not known when this system was discovered and why the number of years allotted to each varies. The year of the Vimshottari dasha is the astronomical solar year of 365.25 days. The classic text Phala Dipika explains:

"Note the exact position of the Sun in the zodiac at the time of birth. When the Sun in the next round arrives at the same position, it is considered as one Solar year which is also the year taken for Udu Dasa system. By sub-dividing the same, days also are calculated." Phala Dipika 19.4 Thus indicating that a year is to be taken as 365.25 days, the length of time for the Sun to return to its original place.

V. B. Rele concluded that in this system the trine is the base used in calculations of planetary periods, that each trine begins with a Janma Nakshatra, and that a certain order was once visible in the sky (which order was also visible in the year 649 A.D. when 0 Degree of Aries sign very nearly coincided with Ashwini Nakshatra) the order in which the nine planetary periods or dashas operate. Hindus calculate their year on the basis of a Savan day of 60 ghatikas from sun-rise to next sun-rise, each ghatika is of 24 minutes duration, 30 Savan Days make one month and 360 Savan Days make one year.

== Significance of Moon ==
The divisional longitude of each of the 27 nakshatras beginning with Ashwini and ending with Revati is 13 degrees and 20 minutes further divided into four quarters or padas. Each of the nine planets presides over a set of three nakshatras situated on the zodiac at a trine from each other. The commencing dasha or mahadasha at the time of birth will be that of the lord of the nakshatra in which the Moon is placed, which particular nakshatra is known as the "Janma nakshatra". If the Moon is in Taurus in Mrigsira the first dasha will be of Mars, the second will be that of Rahu and so on. The distance already covered by the Moon in Mrigsira will be the portion of the dasha of Mars that has elapsed; the distance yet to be covered will represent the portion of the dasha of Mars that is yet to be experienced. The balance is calculated on the basis of the rule of three only in the case of the first mahadasha; the subsequent mahadashas will have their full quota. The balance mahadasha at birth on the basis of the exact longitude of the Moon can be ascertained by using the ready reckoner provided in all Panchangas. The Antar-dashas or the sub-periods and the Prayantar-dashas of each planet is calculated on pro-rata basis in proportion of the years allotted to them in the 120 years cycle of Vimshottari dasha system. Saravali insists that the sign occupied by the Moon and the influences exercised on it by other planets through aspects etc.; at the time of the commencement of its mahadasa should be noted and examined, the same principle should also be applied to other mahadasa lords. If at the time of the commencement of the mahadasa its lord is in the lagna or in benefic or friendly vargas or in an upachyasthana from the Birth ascendant or if the Moon occupies the friendly sign or exaltation sign of the lord of the mahadasa or is in an upachyasthana from the mahadasa lord and the mahadasa lord is in a trine from the Moon then the mahadasa will give exceptionally good results. The order and times of the dashas or mahadashas are shown in the following table:

| Graha | Mahadasha | Lord of Nakshatras | | |
|---|---|---|---|---|
| Ketu (south node) | 7 Years | Ashwini | Magha | Mula |
| Venus (Shukran) | 20 Years | Bharani | Purva Phalguni(pubba) | Purva Ashadha |
| Sun (Adityan) | 6 Years | Krittika | Uttara Phalguni(uttara) | Uttara Ashadha |
| Moon (Chandran) | 10 Years | Rohini | Hasta | Shravana |
| Mars (Chevva/mangal/kuja) | 7 Years | Mrigashirsha | Chitra | Dhanishtha |
| Rahu (north node) | 18 Years | Ardra | Swati | Shatabhishak |
| Jupiter (Vyazhan/guru) | 16 Years | Punarvasu | Vishakha | Purva Bhadrapada |
| Saturn (Shani) | 19 Years | Pushya | Anuradha | Uttara Bhadrapada |
| Mercury (Budhan) | 17 Years | Ashlesha | Jyestha | Revati |

== Implication ==
The sign, the navamsa and the nakshatra occupied by the Moon is of paramount importance; they form the basis for predicting future events. All planets are rendered weak when the Moon is devoid of strength. The results about all astrological problems are to be deduced from the relevant bhava, its lord, its karaka, and their respective dispositors in the light of the intricacy displayed by the various yoga-formations caused by concerned planets. The good or bad results of all yoga-formations are felt during the course of the mahadasha or antra-dashas of planets participating in those yoga-formations. All planets give results in accordance with their basic and acquired qualities, as also in accordance with the quality and status of the nakshatra they rule and occupy.

The nakshatra–wise position of planets and the nakshatras ruled by them cannot be overlooked. Therefore, Jataka Parijata draws attention to an ancient principle and states that counted from the Janma nakshatra the dasas of the planets occupying the first nine nakshatras reflect the effects of the past, from the tenth to the eighteenth nakshatra, the future, and the results of the dasa of planets occupying the nineteenth to the twenty-seventh nakshatra bear no results. The nine nakshatras beginning with the one occupied by the Moon at the time of birth are the "Janma nakshatra", the "Sampata nakshatra", the "Vipat nakshatra", the "Kshema nakshatra", "Pratayari nakshatra", the "Sadhaka nakshatra", "Vadha nakshatra", the "Mitra nakshatra" and the "Ati-mitra nakshatra". The dasas and the antra-dasas of planets occupying the Sampata (2nd), the Sadhaka (6th), the Mitra (8th) and the Param-mitra (9th) confer wealth etc.; the 5th is called the Uttpanna, the 8th the Adhana and the 4th the Maha nakshatra. Planets ruling favourable nakshatras generally tend to give favourable results if they occupy a favourable nakshatra and the nakshatras they rule are not afflicted by planets that rule unfavourable nakshatras.

== Considerations in judging planetary periods ==
Vaidyanatha Dikshita in his Jataka Parijata states that a planet will give better or exceptional results if it is situated in the centre of the bhava occupied by it, the results will minimise the more it is removed from the centre or if it has gained more and more benefic bindus in the Sarva Ashtakavarga or if it occupies the lagna, the 10th or the 11th house or it is exalted, in own or friendly vargas or occupies favourable bhavas in yoga with benefic bhava-lords and karakas. The mahadasa of the planet owning the sign occupied by either Mandi or Gulika or in conjunction with Mandi or gaining very few benefic bindus or occupying its inimical or debilitation sign or combust or afflicted by papa-grahas or in Rasi-sandhi or in Bhava-sandhi or in adverse association with malefics will give poor results.

The results of the planetary periods or dashas depend on the specific strength or weakness of the concerned planet; for the planet to give its best results it should be strong in Shadabala and auspiciously placed with reference to the lagna without being afflicted by inimical malefic planets. Saturn situated in the 5th house from the lagna does not generally confer good results, though it can confer a long span of life but usually makes one evil-minded and quarrelsome. In the case of Gemini lagna, Saturn situated in the 5th will be in its sign of exaltation as a benefic and as the lord of the 9th house; it will give rise to yoga and Dhana yoga. An exalted planet occupying a trikonabhava makes one fortunate and famous; additionally if the lord of the navamsa of occupation is also situated in a quadrant (kendra) or a trine (trikona) from the lagna in own or exaltation sign then one undoubtedly becomes very fortunate and occupies an eminent position in life. All planets give their good or bad results during the course of their mahadasas and antra-dasas; the results vary from person to person because of the varying conditions and circumstances of their individual births and family background, place and country of birth etc., and because planets are never found identically conditioned in any two individual horoscopes. A planet may give a weak constitution but at the same time it may also produce financial and professional prosperity. The mental disposition is judged by reference to the Moon, and the liability to diseases and accidents is judged from the planets associating with the Moon, the Sun and the lagna. Jataka Parijata (Ch. XVIII. Sl.58) states that in the beginning the mahadasa lord gives results in accordance with the house it occupies, in the middle, as per the sign it occupies, and at the close, as per the influence of the planetary aspects that improve or afflict the mahadasa lord. And, Mantreswara in his Phaladeepika explains that the gain or loss of things and the events signified by a particular bhava will be experienced when the lord of the lagna transits a trine from the natal position of the bhava-lord or the bhava-lord transits a trine from the natal point of the lagna, or when during the course of their transits they aspect each other or combine in a sign, or when the bhava-karaka transits the natal position of the lord of the lagna or the lord of the sign occupied by the Moon at the time of birth or when the lord of the lagna transits that bhava.

== Mahadashas ==
While all classic texts on Hindu astrology narrate in general the dasha-effects of planets on the health, wealth, happiness, activity, age and the general well-being of human beings on the premise that all events have the tendency to re-occur, the overall effects of the Vimshottari mahadashas of nine planets are subject to the effects of their respective antra-dashas and paryantra-dashas that depend largely on their location as counted from the mahadasa-lord and their natural and temporal relationship with it. The author of Sarvartha Chintamani has remarked that the ancient seers did not approve any other method for assessment of one's lifespan etc.; other than through the aid of the yogas obtaining at the time of birth and the nature of the dashas likely to operate. The twelve signs, their divisions and sub-divisions, the twenty-seven nakshatras and their divisions, and the nine planets by their simple as well as complex combinations, associations and permutations form thousands of yogas and ava-yogas. Planets in signs with the hind parts rising may show their full effect in the latter part of the mahadasa; in the signs rising with the front part first, in the initial period, and in Pisces, in the middle. Gopesh Kumar Ojha states that the art of interpretation varies from circumstance to circumstance and with the subjective appreciation of the astrologer.

General effects of mahadashas.

- Ketu – 7 years.

If Ketu is favourably placed one devotes time and energy to the perusal of philosophy texts and engages in worship, derives much income from practice of medicine, enjoys domestic comforts and luxuries, good luck and freedom from disease. But if Ketu is ill-placed one may suffer intense pain of body and anguish of mind, accidents, wounds and fever, have low company and suffer bad consequences through them.

- Venus – 20 years.

If Venus is strong and favourably placed one may acquire things of art and pleasure, co-operates with others reciprocally in an harmonious manner and gains, falls in love, gets married, love and affection for spouse increases, begets daughters, rise due to the patronage or favour of some lady and well-wishers. But if Venus is weak and afflicted one suffers from ill-health, contracts urinary or venereal diseases, low sexual prowess, monetary loss, lack of favours and support, disharmony at home and outside and earns a bad name.

- Sun – 6 years.

If the Sun is strong and favourably placed the soul will feel strong, one may make efforts for self-realisation, live splendidly, travel far and wide, engage in strife or hostility that yields good dividend, rise in position and status, gains through trading, and benefits from father or father will benefit. If the Sun is weak and afflicted one may feel inner weakness, suffer decline in physical and mental prowess, health troubles, demotion in rank and status, displeasure of the government, trading losses and suffer at the hands of father or his father may suffer ill-health or die.

- Moon – 10 years.

If the Moon is strong and favourably placed one may have a cheerful heart, a happy and a vigorous mind, facial lustre increases, enjoys subtle pleasures and comforts, obtains a good job or rise in status, gains money and favours and pays homage to gods. If the Moon is weak and afflicted one suffers from ill-health, lethargy and indolence, loss of job or demotion, loss from or quarrel with women and mother may fall ill or die.

- Mars – 7 years.

If Mars is strong and favourably placed one may gain from or through brothers, earn favour from persons wielding authority, enter into or promotion in military, para-military or police service, acquires landed property and other valuables, enjoys good health, exhibits optimism, daring and persistence. If Mars is weak and afflicted one may suffer from fall, wounds, deterioration of blood, at the hands of a magistrate, become quarrelsome, exchanges hot words, earns enmities, hates and litigates.

- Rahu – 18 years.

If Rahu is favourable one may gain ruling powers or rise in governmental favours by resorting to falsehoods, tricks and cunning, earn and gain wealth through unscrupulous means, changes place of residence. But if Rahu is unfavourable one suffers very many losses, suffers from snake-bite, aberration of the mind, hallucinations and illusions, asthma, eczema etc. It is the worst mahadasha for education or career which may be broken or disrupted.

- Jupiter – 16 years.

If Jupiter is strong, well-placed and forms good yogas one is inclined to learning and increase of knowledge; if it comes in middle age it confers wealth and bestows sons, one leads a comfortable life, one goes on pilgrimage and has auspicious celebrations, and in old age bestows, better income and finances. If Jupiter is weak and afflicted one gives up education, suffers from failures, poverty and many miseries including fall from position and ill-health, commits evil deeds, becomes frustrated, sons or grandsons may also suffer.

- Saturn – 19 years.

If Saturn is favourable one rises in service by own strenuous efforts and hard work, derives benefits from things signified by Saturn and gains a legacy. But if Saturn is unfavourable one may suffer from diseases due to malnutrition, poverty, litigation etc.; quarrels and disputes with elders, deaths in the family or of near ones, impediments and obstacles in path of progress and miserable life due to distress all around.

- Mercury – 17 years.

If Mercury is strong and favourable one devotes time and energy to studies, writing etc.; remains active, engages in commerce or politics or diplomacy, gains through dealings with others and trade, enjoys company of friends, peace and tranquillity and lives in comfortable surroundings. But if Mercury is weak and afflicted one may suffer from nervous disease, a bad liver, loss due to bad friends and relations, due to own dishonesty and of others, defamation and the like.

== Antar-dasha or Bhukti ==
Each mahadasha is also subdivided into planetary periods called Antar-dasha or Bhukti, and each antar-dasha is further divided into Pratyantar-dashas which run their course in the same order as the mahadashas, and with the same proportional length. For example, the first bhukti of Ketu is Ketu/Ketu, the second is Ketu/Venus, the third Ketu/Sun and so on. These subdivisions allow a much more detailed examination of the influence of each mahadasha, and a much clearer indication of what events are expected to occur and when.

The last bhukti of each mahadasha is considered to be a preparatory time for the major shift which the next mahadasha will bring. Thus, the last bhukti of the Sun mahadasha is Sun/Venus, which prepares for the coming Moon mahadasha by emphasizing relationships and family matters. Similarly, the last bhukti of Jupiter is Jupiter/Rahu which prepares the mind for the practical and realistic Saturn mahadasha by reattaching it to stress and worldly concerns. The effects of Antra-dasha will vary for each mahadasha based on the strength of dasha lord. The reason is mahadasa is considered as car and Antar-dasha is considered as driver. If the driver (Bhukti lord) is wise, he can drive very well, even though car (the Dasha lord) is not very powerful but the car will have some limitation.

Antar-dasha gives different results according to different ascendents.
