= Yoga (Hindu astrology) =

Concept in Hindu astrology

In Hindu astrology, yoga is the relationship between one planet, sign, or house to another by placement, aspect, or conjunction. It is the consideration of the planetary dasha's directional effects, the most important factor which distinguishes Hindu astrology from Western astrology.

== Background ==
Laghu Parashari, a treatise on dasha, is based on Parashara's Brihat Parashara Hora Shastra and is the simplest and most widely-followed system. Ancient Hindu astrologers seem to have confined their exercises to the seven planets: the Sun, the Moon, Mercury, Venus, Mars, Jupiter, and Saturn; the lunar nodes Rahu and Ketu are rarely mentioned. Parashara refers to five additional chayagrahas, invisible mathematical solar positions which affect individuals and nations. The Rigveda refers to a total of thirty-four chayagrahas: twenty-seven nakshatras lunar stations) and the seven astrological planets. Elsewhere, however, it refers to forty-nine chayagrahas: the previous thirty-four plus the two lunar nodes, the twelve zodiac signs, and ayanamsa. Varahamihira favoured Satyacharya's dasha system, although he said that many people had degraded it with useless additions.

Good or bad planetary results depend on the good or bad yoga caused by the planets. Planets influence each other with mutual, direct (or indirect) sambandha. Auspicious yogas arise when lords of kendras (squares) and trikonas (triangles) establish an association.

== Definitions ==
The word yoga is derived from the Sanskrit root Yuj, meaning to join properly, to control judicially, or to integrate. It has been used to indicate lunisolar distances and planetary situations, associations, and combinations. Yogas are formed when one planet, sign, or house is related to another by placement, aspect or conjunction. The consideration of planetary yogas and dashas is the most important factor that distinguishes Hindu astrology from Western astrology.

Yoga may have good or bad effects. Raja yogas are auspicious, and daridra yogas indicate poverty. Sanyasa yogas indicate sannyasa (renunciation). Some yogas cancel the effects of inauspicious yogas or raja yogas. Some planets yield generally-beneficial yoga, indicating honour and prestige.

== Role of yoga and yoga-causing planets ==
Hindu astrology is based on the interpretation of nakshatras (constellations), rasis (astrological signs) and Navagraha (the astrological planets). Planetary combinations and their indications are based on strength, nature, aspect, and avastha (state). Hindu astrology requires the identification of yogas and their application in accordance with established principles.

Although yogas are based on fundamental principles described in standard texts, not all texts cover all possible planetary combinations and associations, and texts have different interpretations of a given yoga. Certain yogas described in the texts cannot occur; these relate to Mercury and Venus vis-à-vis the Sun. Mercury never goes beyond 28 degrees in front of or behind the Sun, and Venus never goes beyond 47 degrees. Saraswati yoga is common and auspicious.

== Number and effects ==
Yogas are generally classified as Chandra (Moon), Surya (Sun), Nabhasa (celestial), Raja, Dhana, or Darida. Their common factor is the relative strength of the planets and their houses by ownership, occupation or aspect. Janardan Harji, in the fourth chapter of his Mansagari, assigns certain outcomes to certain combinations. Yoga results are indicated by the circumstances of birth and the course of a person's life, from birth to death.

According to Saravali, the planets amplify a person's fate. Hindu astrologers have attempted to enumerate all possible yogas, with varied results.
