= Mansagari =

Treatise on Hindu predictive astrology

- Author: Janardan Harji or Mansagara Gani
- Language: Sanskrit
- Subject: Astrology
- Publication place: India

Mansagari is a popular classical treatise on predictive astrology. It is written in the usual poetic form in the traditional Sanskrit Sloka format; the language and the method of expression used are both simple and unambiguous, and therefore, easy to understand.

The Rajasthan Oriental Research Institute, established by the Government of Rajasthan, identifies Jain monk Manasagara Gani as the author of the text. According to the works Jain Jyotish Pragati Aur Parampara, Muhurtraj, and Munidwaya Abhinandan Granth, Mansagari is a work on Jain astrology, and its author Manasagara was a Muni. The Sanskrit text of this book hails the first Tirthankara Adinatha, his Ganesha or chief disciple Pundarika, and Tirthankara Parshavanatha, before also showing reverence for Hindu and Islamic beliefs.

Another possible author of this text, Janardan Harji, about whom not much is known, was the son of Janardan, of Gurjar Mandala (present-day Indian state of Gujarat), who belonged to the Shandilya Gotra, who was also a learned and renowned astrologer of his time and place.

This text, comprising five chapters, covers briefly the essential parts of Ganitha and Siddhanta, but deals with the Phalita portion of Hindu astrology in far greater detail. It has described numerous yogas and Raja yogas and also narrated their effects, as also the results of the planetary dashas as all major dasha systems in vogue. Along with the more renowned works of Parashara and Varahamihira, Mansagari has remained a standard reference book. The book, Three Hundred Important Combinations, was written by Bangalore Venkata Raman on the basis of Jataka Tantra, Parashara Hora Sastra and Mansagari.

Mansagari is credited with revealing many unique principles that have withstood the test of time; one such principle pertains to the Panch Mahapurusha yogas to the effect that the conjunction of either the Sun or the Moon with the planet giving rise to this yoga cancels that particular Panch Mahapurusha yoga or Raja yoga; in which regard the study of its Bhaveshphala Nirupana section of Second Chapter assumes prime importance.
