= Phaladeepika =

Hindu astrological text

- Author: Mantreswara
- Language: Sanskrit
- Subject: Astrology
- Publication place: India

Phaladeepika is a treatise on Hindu astrology written by Mantreswara. The text is written in lyrical Sanskrit verse comprises 865 slokas and 28 chapters. It is one of the more significant works on Hindu astrology, along with Bṛhat Parāśara Horāśāstra of Parashara, Brihat Jataka of Varahamihira, and Jataka Parijata of Vaidyanatha Dikshita. It deals in a most comprehensive and authoritative manner with almost all astrological aspects of human life. Mantreswara has equated a retrograde planet with an exalted planet in strength and effects even though it be in an inimical or its debilitation sign differing with Saravali which states that benefics are powerful when retrograde and cause Raja yoga (Hindu astrology) but malefic when retrograde do not confer favourable results.

== Author ==
Very little is known about its author, Mantreswara, who is believed to have lived in the 13th century CE. He was born Markandeya Bhattathiri in a family of Namboodari Brahmins in Panchgiri village of Tirunelveli in the Indian state of Tamil Nadu. The exact date of his birth and date of death are not known, some believe that he lived in the 13th century and some believe that he lived in the 16th century.

He was a devotee of Sukuntlambika Devi. He had traveled to far-off places in India in search of knowledge. He had renounced the world and had finally died in Tirunelveli; his date of birth and his date of death are not known.

According to one belief Mantreswara was born in Shalivati in Tamil Nadu and according to another, he was born in Kerala. Whether he lived in the 13th century or in the 16th century remains undecided. His work, Phaladeepika, though very popular in South India and from a very long time in the past available in Southern languages script-versions came to light when its original Sanskrit version was published from Kolkata around 1925. At the very close of this text, Mantreswara confirms that

श्रीशालिवाटिजातेन मया मन्त्रेश्वरेण वै |
दैवज्ञेन द्विजाग्रेण सतां ज्योतिर्विदां मुदे || - Sloka XXVIII.5

he indeed lived in Shalivati, in present Tirunelveli, as a Brahmin astrologer.
