= Lagna =

First moment of contact between the soul and its new life on earth in Hindu astrology

In Vedic Astrology Jyotiṣa, the Lagna or Hour Marker, is the first moment of contact between the soul and its new life on earth in Jyotiṣa. Lagna's Rashi and Nakshatra represents the "Atman" (Soul) of an Individual Person while the Lagna Lord which represents the Ruler of the Horoscope absorbs the traits and qualities of that specific Rashi & Nakshatra.

Astronomically, the Lagna corresponds to the portion of the zodiac intersecting the eastern horizon at a given moment, and it marks the beginning of the first house (bhāva) in a natal chart. The remaining houses are then enumerated sequentially from this point. In Jyotiṣa, the Lagna is considered a foundational element of horoscope interpretation, as it provides the framework for assessing planetary placements, house significations, and their interrelationships. Classical astrological literature emphasizes the central role of the Lagna and its ruling planet in the overall analysis of a birth chart.

== Beliefs and functions ==
One's Hour Marker, or Lagna, is the degree of the rāśi and nakshatra specifically the nakshatra pada which is either rising on the eastern horizon (Udaya Lagna) or setting in the western horizon (Godhuli Lagna) depending on the sunrise or sunset astrological tradition at the time of one's birth.

=== Udaya lagna - The Most Effective Point ===
The Most Effective Point (MEP) of the Hour Marker - Lagna, is that point of the zodiacal belt that coincides with the position of the horizon at the time of birth, for a given place of birth.

This is more specifically called the Udaya Lagna to differentiate it from charts in which other points are used to determine the first house of the horoscope (see below.) The Udaya Lagna is the most important factor that plays an influential role within the natal chart.

This Udaya Lagna also frequently referred to as Lagna will show what is the reality that will happen to a person in his real life and also the characteristics of that Lagna's Rasi and Nakshatra will be impressed upon the person or event being born affecting his character, behaviour, personality and also individuality in a very influential way.

This sign known as the Udaya Lagna can be considered the first house of the horoscope, and the enumeration of the other houses follows in sequence through the rest of the signs of the zodiac. In this way, the Lagna does not only delineate the rising sign, but also all the other houses in the chart.

=== Division of lagnam and raasi ===
The division of lagnam is same as raasi (1 raasi has 9 nakshatra padas). It is the same twelve division of a complete day each of duration two hours. However, the definition of lagnam is related to an individual time and place of birth. This is to differentiate between two persons born on the same day but at different places (or different longitudinal divisions) or two persons born on same day, same place but at different time of the day.

In modern terms this is to differentiate people born on the same day but at different time zones. Thus, a person born on same day but in different longitudinal division is born while Earth is facing different raasi and nakshatra. Thus, lagnam of a person is the raasi and nakshatra faced by the part of the Earth surface on which he is born.

Fix a point on the surface of Earth. Note that the point will face all the 12 segments (raasis) of celestial sky, and also the 27 different nakshatra's while the earth spins on its axis. Since the raasis are 30 degree segment, the point will take 2 hours (or 5 nazhigais or 2.5 muhurtam) to move from one raasi to other. A day is divided in to 12 lagnams or ascendant with each lagnam of two-hour duration. A person's lagnam is the lagnam on which he is born on a given day of the given place.

=== Use in matchmaking ===
Next, another Lagna used in astrology, which is the rāśi (or sign) and nakshatra (constellation) in which the moon is found at birth. Usually the Moon's rasi and nakshatra are used to see marriage compatibility between a boy and a girl because it's easy to locate the position of the moon based on the Panchanga but each and every individual must know the following:

Matching based solely on the Moon’s rāśi and nakshatra, as used in Guna Milan, is considered limited in scope. Astrologers often recommend also considering the Lagna (Ascendant) and its associated rāśi and nakshatra for a more comprehensive view of compatibility.

The other 40% of marriage matchmaking is known as Jathagam Porutham (Matching of the Birth Chart and also the Navamsa Chart of both boy and girl) which is equally important together with reference to the Lagna and that will include all the planetary positions, Naga Dosham and Kala Sarpa Dosham (Position of Rahu-Ketu), Kalathra Dosham or Mangalya Dosham [Position of (Mars-for both), (Venus-for boy) and (Jupiter-for girl), etc. that needs to be taken into account to fulfil the other 40% requirement.

=== Chandra Lagna ===
The Chandra Lagna chart, which is also another way used to analyze the horoscope, is a chart in which the Moon's zodiac sign is used to calculate the Lagna (see Rasi Lagna and Surya Lagna below). The enumeration of the other houses are made starting from the new Lagna obtained and continuing in sequence throughout the rest of the zodiac signs.

The astrologer will use the Chandra Lagna only to see from the perspective of what one desires from his or her mind since the Moon's position is the reflection of the mind among planets.

=== Calculation of Lagna ===
The Lagna of a person always changes in about an average of 2 hours which makes the Lagna the fastest in movement and the second position goes to the Moon.

1 day is equal to 24 hours and the Lagna successfully completes a rotation around the 12 rashis within the 24 hours (an average of 2 hours for each rashi) which also means that the Lagna completes the 27 nakshatras and 108 nakshatra padas in a day.

The calculation of the Lagna is usually based on the time and place of birth when the child that the doctor has delivered begins to show signs of life (crying) and might be difficult to calculate for those who never recorded their Birth Time and therefore most astrologers end up using the Moon's rashi and nakshatra which is always termed and generally taken as the Janma Rashi and Janma Nakshatra.

At the time of birth, the zodiac sign rising on the east of the birthplace is known as Udaya Lagna whereas the zodiac sign setting in the west of the birthplace is known as Godhuli Lagna. Both is also known as Janma Lagna depending on the astrological tradition [whether the day starts and ends at sunrise (known as Udaya Lagna) or whether the day starts and ends at sunset (known as Godhuli Lagna)].

The Moon's rashi and nakshatra does not give an accurate and acute reading of a person's character and so it is to be taken as third importance only after Lagna's and Lagnathipathi/Lagna Lord's (Rashi & Nakshatra) because:

1. As mentioned above the Moon represents the Mind and also the Moon's Rasi and Nakshatra represents a mirror image of an individual person whereby you can never judge a person just by their appearance as you never know what they are from the bottom of their heart (only Lagna's Rasi and Nakshatra can define a person in this case). This is also akin to the quality and characteristics of the moon that only reflects and imitates the light of the sun during the night.

2. Its importance only arises when you want to calculate the Mahadasha and Vimshottari Dasha of an individual's chart. The results obtained from each of the Mahadasha and Vimshottari Dasha are to be taken from the Lagna respectively. Each planet has its own Mahadasha period (also called as planets mahadasha period), and it can last for several years. The Mahadasha period of each planet has a different effect on a person’s life.

3. The Moon takes about 2 1/4 days to 2 1/2 days to complete 1 Rashi and almost 1 day to complete 1 Nakshatra so it is very common to see many people being born in the same nakshatra but these people in real life (with twins as an example) may not the same in character even though they're born in the same Nakshatra.

This difference will arise when their Lagna's positions (Rashi, Nakshatra and Nakshatra padas) changes. Therefore the purpose of the whole birth chart of the individual person also changes.

== The Kalapurusha's Zodiacs ==
Kalapurusha's Head to Feet (Exterior Body Parts) represents the 12 zodiacs that begin with:

1. Aries stands for his head
2. Taurus for His face
3. Gemini for the Neck and shoulders
4. Cancer for chest and heart
5. Leo for his stomach and its organs
6. Virgo for his Hip
7. Libra represents the lower abdominal and spinal region
8. Scorpio for the reproductive organs and kidney etc
9. Sagittarius is the thigh
10. Capricorn is the Knees
11. Aquarius is the calf
12. Pisces is the feet.

While the nine planets resembles The Kalapurusha's (Inner Body Parts) that begins with:

1. Sun: Body Parts It Denotes: Soul, Stomach, bone, right eye, heart, skin, belly, head constitution of body.
2. Moon: Body Parts It Denotes: Mind, heart, lungs, eye, brain, blood, breast, body fluids, intestines, renal ducts, lymphatic duct and artery.
3. Mars: Body Parts It Denotes: Blood, marrow, energy, neck, veins, genitals, neck, red blood cells, anus, female organs and body energy.
4. Mercury: Body Parts It Denotes: Brain, hair, face, chest, nervous system, skin, nose, gallbladder, lungs, tongue and arms.
5. Jupiter: Body Parts It Denotes: Jupiter is the karaka of thighs, fat, brain, liver, kidneys, lungs, ears, tongue, memory, spleen etc.
6. Venus: Body Parts It Denotes: Overall physical appearance, face, facial expressions, eyes, genitals, urine, reproductive organs, throat and glands.
7. Saturn: Body Parts It Denotes: Lower body parts, legs, bones, knee, bone-joints, muscles, teeth, skin, hair and ears.
8. Rahu: Body Parts It Denotes: Legs, neck, lungs and breathing.
9. Ketu: Body Parts It Denotes: Belly (stomach), feet and claws.

All of these are included in and as a single entity known as the Kalapurusha. As stated earlier, Sage Parashara have mentioned that the Lagna and the Lagna Lord resembles the Kalapurusha. Therefore, Sage Parashara had given a strong emphasis on the prime importance of the Lagna and also the Lagna Lord. So it is important for an Individual not to ignore the position of their Lagna's (Rasi & Nakshatra) because it represents individuality, character, behavior, attitude, intelligence, personality, etc. To sum up the Lagna (Lagna's Rasi & Nakshatra) is the Atman (Soul) of the individual person whereas the Lagna Lord and its (Rashi & Nakshatra) represents the single most important planet in the horoscope and also how and where are you going to utilize all of the aforementioned qualities obtained from the Lagna to focus and succeed your ambition and motive in your life.

== Rarely used lagnas ==
In addition, the ṛṣi Parāśara mentioned a few other special Hour Marker or Viśeṣa Lagna. to be used in special circumstances, including:

- Rāśi Lagna (Hour Marker counted from the starting point 0° of the Zodiac Sign where the natal Sun is located in the horoscope)
- Sūrya Lagna [Hour Marker counted from exact longitude (Degree, Minutes and Seconds) of the Sun where the natal Sun is located in the horoscope]
- Kāraka Lagna (significator taken as Hour Marker for all grahas)
- Varṇaḍā Lagna (for social company)
- Śrī Lagna (for prosperity and marriage)
- Indu Lagna (for wealth)
- Horā Lagna (for financial prosperity)
- Gati Lagna (for name and fame)

Lastly, there are some Lagnas which are determined by factors outside the chart, and are used for electional and horary charts. These are:

- Dig Lagna (first house is determined by compass direction)
- Śabda Lagna (first house is determined by the "words a client utters")
- Sparṣa Lagna (first house is determined by a part of the body which is touched)
- Nāma Lagna (first house is determined by the numerology of the person's name)

== Ārūḍha Lagna ==
The term Ārūḍha Pada is also known as "Pada". Ārūḍha literally means "mount" and refers to the IMAGE of a sign falling on another due to "reflection of the rays emanating from it and being reflected by its lord.

Keeping the reflection in view, the Kāraka (Significator) can be taken to be the Moon. Count from a sign to its lord. Then count as many signs from the lord to arrive at the ĀRŪḌHA PADA. For example, if the Lagna Lord (Lagneśa) is in the fifth house, then count five signs from the Lagneśa to arrive at the ninth house. This ninth house becomes the Ārūḍha Pada for the Lagna.

Exception: The Ārūḍha Pada cannot be in the same sign or the seventh from it. In case this happens, then choose the tenth house therefrom. For example, if the Lagneśa is in the 4th house, then the Ārūḍha Lagna should be in the 4th from the 4th house i.e. the 7th house. But since this is not allowed, the tenth from the 4th should be chosen. The tenth from the 4th house is the 1st house or the Lagna becomes the Ārūḍha Lagna also.

Ārūḍha of 1st house is also called PADA LAGNA or ĀRŪḌHA LAGNA. Ārūḍha Lagna stands for "manifestation of self, in this Māyā (illusory) world". In this manner Ārūḍha Pada can be computed for all the houses. They are called Dhana Pada (2nd), Bhrātṛpada (3rd), Mātṛ Pada (4th), Mantrapada (5th), Śatrupada (6th), Dāra Pada (7th), Roga pada (8th), Bhāgyapada (9th), Rājyapada (10th), Lābhapada (11th) and Upapada (12th). Jaimini discussed Ārūḍha Lagna (AL) and Upapada (UL) extensively in his classical treatise.
