= Raja yoga (Hindu astrology) =

Type of yogas

Raja yogas a.k.a. Raj Yogs are Shubha ('auspicious') yogas in jyotisha philosophy and tradition.

== Raja yogas based on placement of planets ==
B. Suryanarain Rao writes that peculiar powers seem to characterise the angular positions of the planets which enable persons born under such combinations to become kings (i.e. acquire ruling powers).

All planets occupying the kendras gain exceptional strength. Mars and Saturn are natural malefic but both situated in the kendras can confer advancement in life though tending to prove evil towards the end. Saturn in Cancer (when it becomes a temporary friend of Jupiter) and Mars in Capricorn produce prominent persons but not vice versa. Saturn in Libra in a kendra from the Lagna or the Chandra-lagna causing Sasa yoga, a Panch Mahapurusha yoga, gives wealth, status, fame and also ruling power but does not give a happy life because of its square aspect on Cancer and being in the 8th from Pisces the exaltation sign for means.

The greatest yog according to Jaimini and Parashar is when Saturn is in the 10th house and Moon is in the 4th either in Cancer or Capricorn sign there arises a significant yoga which makes a king who will rule the world. The same yog if happens in 1st and 7th house will give rise to a lesser raj yog making the person the king of a kingdom.

The trikonas are as sensitive as the kendras if not more; planets in mutual trikonas become effective co-workers. The antra-dasha of the planet situated in a kendra or in a trikona from the dasha-lord generally confers auspicious results. The Sun in the 4th, a retrograde Venus in the 5th with Jupiter situated in the lagna, or Saturn in the 9th, Mars exalted, and Mercury, Venus and Jupiter combining in the 5th house give rise to powerful Raja yogas which yogas illustrate the importance and effectiveness of the trinal aspects of planets more particularly that of Jupiter.

There are some Raja yogas described by texts which simply cannot occur, e.g. Varahamihira states that if exalted Mercury occupies lagna, Venus occupies the 10th, the Moon and Jupiter join in the 7th and Saturn and Mars occupy the 5th, the person becomes a ruler, this yoga cannot occur because Mercury cannot be in a kendra from Venus, certainly not 77 degrees apart for this yoga to arise, or if the Moon, Saturn and Jupiter are in the 10th, 11th and lagna respectively, Mercury and Mars in the 2nd and Venus and the Sun in the 4th, which event cannot take place because Mercury can never be in the 3rd house counted from the Sun.

== Raja yogas based on conjunction/combination of planets ==
The lord of the 10th house counted from the stronger of the two, the Lagna or the Chandra-lagna, occupying a kendra or a trikona or the 2nd house vested with required strength by itself gives rise to Raja yoga (Mansagari IV Raja yoga 4). If at the time of birth the Moon is in an Upachayasthana, all benefic planets occupy their own signs and navamsas and all malefic planets are weak in strength the person will rise to be a ruler equal to Indra (Mansagari IV Raja yoga 16). Venus and Mars combining in the 2nd house with Jupiter situated in Pisces, Mercury and Saturn in Libra and the Moon occupying its debilitation sign give rise to Raja yoga, in which event the person will be generous, wealthy, proud and famous ruling a vast territory (Mansagari IV Raja yoga 33). If the Moon combines with the Sun in the first half of Sagittarius sign, Saturn vested with strength is in the lagna and Mars is exalted a mighty much venerated ruler is born (Mansagari IV Raja yoga 65–66).

The conjunction of Jupiter with either Mars or the Moon giving rise to auspicious yogas also pave the ground for Raja yoga-formation, however, Ramanuja states that in these two events the person will be fortunate and prosperous in the dashas of Mars and the Moon but Jupiter's dasha will be ordinary.

== Raja yogas based on mutual association of planets ==
Even though Venus and Jupiter are not mutual friends and Venus is not happily placed in a Martian sign Ramanuja states that Venus confers Raja yoga in its dasha if it is in conjunction with Jupiter in Scorpio.

Parasara calls the kendras the Vishnusthanas and the trikonas, the Lakshmisthanas; their lords in mutual association become yogakarakas and Rajayogakarakas as in the case of Dharma Karmadhipati yoga and Sankha yoga. These lords attaining Parijatadi awastha ('status') make one a ruler who takes care of and protects his subjects; attaining Uttamadi awastha they make one a wealthy ruler; attaining Gopuradi awastha they make one a ruler who is held in high esteem and venerated, and attaining Simhasanadi awastha they make one an all-conquering mighty ruler. Those born under the influence such strong kendra and trikona lords and the lord of the 2nd house, have emerged as great rulers; those blessed with these lords attaining Simhasanasha and Gopuransha have emerged as rulers and Chakravarti Samrats like Raja Harishchandra and Vaivasvata Manu. Yudhishthira was blessed with similarly strong lords as also Shalivahana. Person born with all these seven lords attaining Devaloka awasthas will be the Avatar of Lord Vishnu.

== Special or Rare Raja yogas ==
Raja yogas described in the various texts are numerous, but among those thousands are some that are very special and some that are very rare in occurrence, such as:

- Neecha Bhanga Rajayoga
- Pancha Mahapurusha yoga
- Adhi yoga
- Kahala yoga
- Chamara yoga
- Akhanda Samrajya yoga
- Viparita Raja yoga

There are very many Raja yogas but it is essential to know as to when those Raja yogas would yield their assigned results. The benefits of Raja yoga accrue during the course of the dasha of the Raja yoga causing planets occupying the 10th house from the Lagna or the Chandra-lagna, failing which during the dasha of the strongest planet amongst the planets giving rise to the Raja yoga provided Bhagya ('good luck') also sides the native. The actual exercise of ruling power is not in the destiny of all persons/politicians blessed with powerful Raja yogas who mostly land up serving those actually exercising ruling power.

Birth at the time of (exact) mid-day (Local Mean Time) or at the time of (exact) mid-night (Local Mean Time) by itself gives rise to Raja yoga.

== Rajayogabhanga or nullification of Raja yogas ==
In any Raja yoga formation if the lord of the 10th house happens to occupy the 6th house counted from the 10th the impact of that yoga wiil be slight or for a short period only, there will be no permanent yoga.
