= Hindu astrology =

Indian form of astrology

Hindu astrology, also called Indian astrology, jyotisha (Sanskrit: ज्योतिष, romanized: jyotiṣa; from jyót 'light, heavenly body') and, more recently, Vedic astrology, is the traditional Hindu system of astrology. It is one of the six auxiliary disciplines in Hinduism that is connected with the study of the Vedas.

The Vedanga Jyotisha is one of the earliest texts about astronomy within the Vedas. Some scholars believe that the horoscopic astrology practiced in the Indian subcontinent came from Hellenistic influences. However, this is a point of intense debate, and other scholars believe that Jyotisha developed independently, although it may have interacted with Greek astrology.

The scientific consensus is that astrology is a pseudoscience.

== Etymology ==
Jyotisha, states Monier-Williams, is rooted in the word Jyotish, which means light, such as that of the sun or the moon or a heavenly body. The term Jyotisha includes the study of astronomy, astrology, and the science of timekeeping using the movements of astronomical bodies. It aimed to keep time, maintain calendars, and predict auspicious times for Vedic rituals.

== History and core principles ==
Jyotiṣa is one of the Vedāṅga, the six auxiliary disciplines used to support Vedic rituals. Early jyotiṣa is concerned with the preparation of a calendar to determine dates for sacrificial rituals, with nothing written regarding planets. There are mentions of eclipse-causing "demons" in the Atharvaveda and Chāndogya Upaniṣad, the latter mentioning Rāhu (a shadow entity believed responsible for eclipses and meteors). The Ṛigveda also mentions an eclipse-causing demon, Svarbhānu. However, the specific term graha was not applied to Svarbhānu until the later Mahābhārata and Rāmāyaṇa.

The foundation of Hindu astrology is the notion of bandhu of the Vedas (scriptures), which is the connection between the microcosm and the macrocosm. The practice relies primarily on the sidereal zodiac, which differs from the tropical zodiac used in Western (Hellenistic) astrology in that an ayanāṃśa adjustment is made for the gradual precession of the vernal equinox. Hindu astrology includes several nuanced sub-systems of interpretation and prediction with elements not found in Hellenistic astrology, such as its system of lunar mansions (Nakṣatra). It was only after the transmission of Hellenistic astrology that the order of planets in India was fixed in that of the seven-day week. Hellenistic astrology and astronomy also transmitted the twelve zodiacal signs beginning with Aries and the twelve astrological places beginning with the ascendant. The first evidence of the introduction of Greek astrology to India is the Yavanajātaka which dates to the early centuries CE. The Yavanajātaka (lit. "Sayings of the Greeks") was translated from Greek to Sanskrit by Yavaneśvara during the 2nd century CE, and is considered the first Indian astrological treatise in the Sanskrit language. However the only version that survives is the verse version of Sphujidhvaja which dates to 270 CE. The first Indian astronomical text to define the weekday was the Āryabhaṭīya of Āryabhaṭa (born 476 CE).

In the 300 years between the first Yavanajataka and the Āryabhaṭīya, Indian astronomers likely focused on Indianizing and Sanskritizing Greek astronomy, according to Michio Yano. No astronomical texts are available from this period. The later Pañcasiddhāntikā of Varāhamihira summarizes the five known Indian astronomical schools of the sixth century. Indian astronomy preserved some of the older pre-Ptolemaic elements of Greek astronomy.

The main texts upon which classical Indian astrology is based are early medieval compilations, notably the Bṛhat Parāśara Horāśāstra, and Sārāvalī by Kalyāṇavarma. The Horāshastra is a composite work of 71 chapters, of which the first part (chapters 1–51) dates to the 7th to early 8th centuries and the second part (chapters 52–71) to the late 8th century. The Sārāvalī likewise dates to around 800 CE. N. N. Krishna Rau and V. B. Choudhari published English translations of these texts in 1963 and 1961, respectively.

== Modern Hindu astrology ==
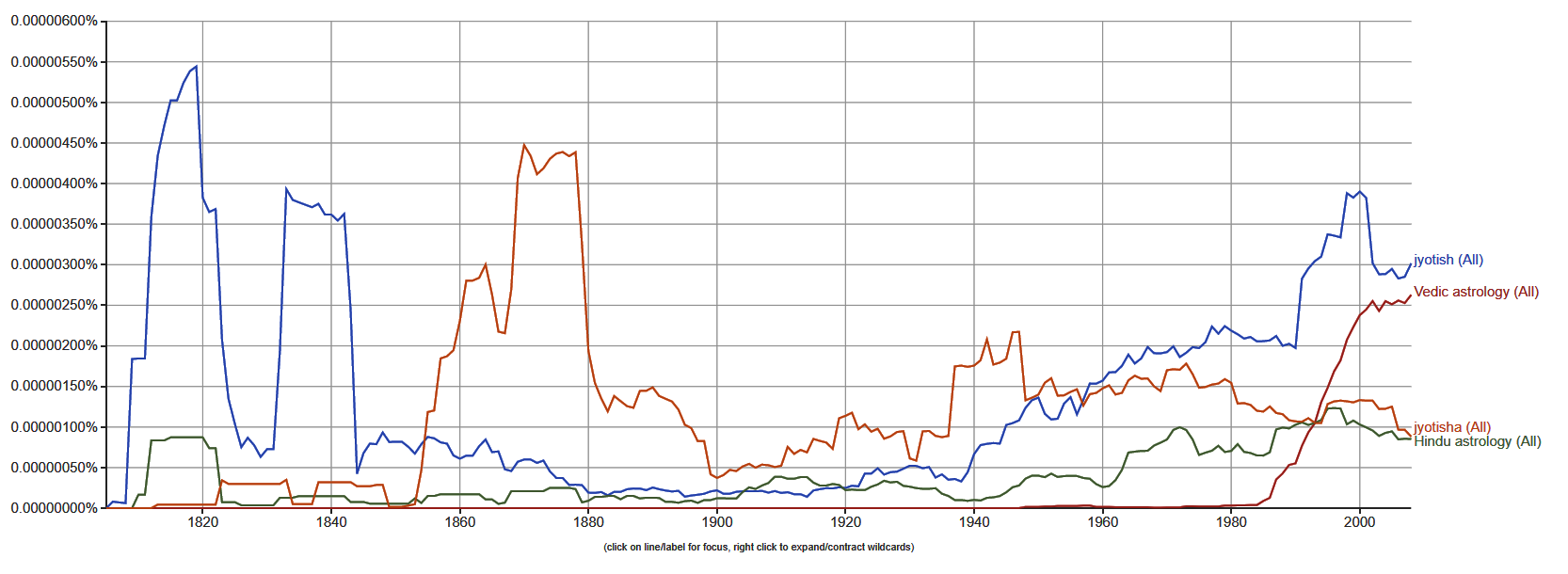
Nomenclature of the last two centuries

Astrology remains an important facet of folk belief in the contemporary lives of many Hindus. In Hindu culture, newborns are traditionally named based on their jyotiṣa charts (kundali), and astrological concepts are pervasive in the organization of the Hindu calendar and holidays and in making major decisions such as those about marriage, opening a new business, or moving into a new home. Many Hindus believe that heavenly bodies, including the planets, have an influence throughout the life of a human being, and these planetary influences are the "fruit of karma". The Navagraha, planetary deities, are considered subordinate to Ishvara (the Hindu concept of a supreme being) in the administration of justice. Thus, it is believed that these planets can influence earthly life.

=== Scientific status ===
The scientific community has rejected astrology as having no explanatory power for describing the universe. Scientific testing of astrology has been conducted, and no evidence has been found to support any of the premises or purported effects outlined in astrological traditions. There is no mechanism proposed by astrologers through which the positions and motions of stars and planets could affect people and events on Earth. In spite of its status as a pseudoscience, in certain religious, political, and legal contexts, astrology retains a position among the sciences in modern India.

India's University Grants Commission and Ministry of Human Resource Development decided to introduce "Jyotir Vigyan" (i.e. jyotir vijñāna) or "Vedic astrology" as a discipline of study in Indian universities, stating that "vedic astrology is not only one of the main subjects of our traditional and classical knowledge but this is the discipline, which lets us know the events happening in human life and in universe on time scale" in spite of the lack of evidence that astrology allows for such accurate predictions. The decision was backed by a 2001 judgment of the Andhra Pradesh High Court, and some Indian universities offer advanced degrees in astrology. This was met with widespread protests from the scientific community in India and Indian scientists working abroad. A petition sent to the Supreme Court of India stated that the introduction of astrology to university curricula is "a giant leap backwards, undermining whatever scientific credibility the country has achieved so far".

In 2004, the Supreme Court dismissed the petition, concluding that the teaching of astrology did not qualify as the promotion of religion. In February 2011, the Bombay High Court referred to the 2004 Supreme Court ruling when it dismissed a case which had challenged astrology's status as a science. As of 2014, despite continuing complaints by scientists, astrology continues to be taught at various universities in India, and there is a movement in progress to establish a national Vedic University to teach astrology together with the study of tantra, mantra, and yoga.

Sceptics have debunked the claims made by Indian astrologers. For example, although the planet Saturn is in the constellation Aries roughly every 30 years (e.g. 1909, 1939, 1968), the astrologer Bangalore Venkata Raman claimed that "when Saturn was in Aries in 1939 England had to declare war against Germany", ignoring all the other dates. Astrologers regularly fail in attempts to predict election results in India, and fail to predict major events such as the assassination of Indira Gandhi. Predictions by the head of the Indian Astrologers Federation about war between India and Pakistan in 1982 also failed.

In 2000, when several planets happened to be close to one another, astrologers predicted that there would be catastrophes, volcanic eruptions and tidal waves. This caused an entire sea-side village in the Indian state of Gujarat to panic and abandon their houses. The predicted events did not occur and the vacant houses were burgled.

== Texts ==
Time keeping

[The current year] minus one,
multiplied by twelve,
multiplied by two,
added to the elapsed [half months of current year],
increased by two for every sixty [in the sun],
is the quantity of half-months (syzygies).

— Rigveda Jyotisha-vedanga 4
Translator: Kim Plofker

The ancient extant text on Jyotisha is the Vedanga-Jyotisha, which exists in two editions, one linked to the Rigveda and other to Yajurveda. The Rigveda version consists of 36 verses, while the Yajurveda recension has 43 verses of which 29 verses are borrowed from the Rigveda. The Rigveda version is attributed to the sage Lagadha and sometimes to the sage Shuci. The Yajurveda version does not attribute credit to any specific sage, has endured into the modern era with a commentary by Somakara, and is considered the more studied version.

The Jyotisha text Brahma-siddhanta, probably composed in the 5th century CE, discusses how to use the movements of the planets, Sun and Moon to keep time and maintain a calendar. This text also lists trigonometry and mathematical formulae to support its theory of orbits, predict planetary positions and calculate relative mean positions of celestial nodes and apsides. The text is notable for presenting very large integers, such as the lifetime of the current universe being 4.32 billion years.

The ancient Hindu texts on Jyotisha discuss only timekeeping and never mention astrology or prophecy. These ancient texts predominantly cover astronomy, but at a rudimentary level. Technical horoscopes and astrological ideas in India came from Greece and developed in the early centuries of the 1st millennium CE. Later medieval era texts such as the Yavana-jataka and the Siddhanta texts are more astrology-related.

== Evolution of Vedic timekeeping ==
The field of Jyotisha deals with ascertaining time, particularly forecasting auspicious days and times for Vedic rituals. The field of Vedanga structured time into Yuga, a five year interval, divided into multiple lunisolar intervals such as 60 solar months, 61 savana months, 62 synodic months and 67 sidereal months. A Vedic Yuga had 1,860 tithis (तिथि, dates), and it defined a savana-day (civil day) from one sunrise to another.

The Rigvedic version of Jyotisha may be a later insertion into the Veda, states David Pingree, possibly between 513 and 326 BCE, when the Indus Valley was occupied by the Achaemenid from Mesopotamia. The mathematics and devices for timekeeping mentioned in these ancient Sanskrit texts, proposes Pingree, such as the water clock, may also have arrived in India from Mesopotamia. However, Yukio Ohashi considers this proposal as incorrect, suggesting instead that the Vedic timekeeping efforts, for forecasting appropriate times for rituals, must have begun much earlier and the influence may have flowed from India to Mesopotamia. Ohashi states that it is incorrect to assume that the number of civil days in a year equals 365 in both the Hindu and Egyptian–Persian years. Further, adds Ohashi, the Mesopotamian formula is different from the Indian formula for calculating time, each can only work for their respective latitude, and either would make major errors in predicting time and calendar in the other region. According to Asko Parpola, the Jyotisha and luni-solar calendar discoveries in ancient India, and similar discoveries in China in "great likelihood result from convergent parallel development", and not from diffusion from Mesopotamia.

Kim Plofker states that while a flow of timekeeping ideas from either side is plausible, each may have instead developed independently, because the loan-words typically seen when ideas migrate are missing on both sides as far as words for various time intervals and techniques. Further, adds Plofker, and other scholars, that the discussion of timekeeping concepts is found in the Sanskrit verses of the Shatapatha Brahmana, a 2nd millennium BCE text. Water clocks and sundials are mentioned in many ancient Hindu texts such as the Arthashastra. Plofker suggests that the arrival of Greek astrological ideas in India may have led to a roundabout integration of Mesopotamian and Indian Jyotisha-based systems.

The Jyotisha texts present mathematical formulae to predict the length of daytime, sunrise and moon cycles. For example,

The length of daytime = $\left(12 + \frac{2}{61}n \right)$ muhurtas
where n is the number of days before or after the winter solstice, and one muhurta equals 1/30 of a day (48 minutes).

Water clock
A prastha of water [is] the increase in day, [and] decrease in night in the [sun's] northern motion; vice versa in the southern. [There is] a six-muhurta [difference] in a half year.

— Yajurveda Jyotisha-vedanga 8, Translator: Kim Plofker

== Elements ==
There are sixteen Varga (Sanskrit: varga, 'part, division'), or divisional, charts used in Hindu astrology:

=== Zodiac ===
The Nirayana, or sidereal zodiac, is an imaginary belt of 360 degrees, which, like the Sāyana, or tropical zodiac, is divided into 12 equal parts. Each part (of 30 degrees) is called a sign or rāśi (Sanskrit: 'part'). Vedic (Jyotiṣa) and Western zodiacs differ in the method of measurement. While synchronically, the two systems are identical, Jyotiṣa primarily uses the sidereal zodiac (in which stars are considered to be the fixed background against which the motion of the planets is measured), whereas most Western astrology uses the tropical zodiac (the motion of the planets is measured against the position of the Sun on the spring equinox). After two millennia, as a result of the precession of the equinoxes, the origin of the ecliptic longitude has shifted by about 30 degrees. As a result, the placement of planets in the Jyotiṣa system is roughly aligned with the constellations, while tropical astrology is based on the solstices and equinoxes.

English	Sanskrit	Starting	Representation	Element	Quality	Ruling body
Aries	मेष, meṣa	0°	ram	fire	movable (chara)	Mars
Taurus	वृषभ, vṛṣabha	30°	bull	earth	fixed (sthira)	Venus
Gemini	मिथुन, mithuna	60°	twins	air	dual (dvisvabhava)	Mercury
Cancer	कर्क, karka	90°	crab	water	movable	Moon
Leo	सिंह, siṃha	120°	lion	fire	fixed	Sun
Virgo	कन्या, kanyā	150°	virgin girl	earth	dual	Mercury, Ketu
Libra	तुला, tulā	180°	balance	air	movable	Venus
Scorpio	वृश्चिक, vṛścika	210°	scorpion	water	fixed	Mars
Sagittarius	धनुष, dhanuṣa	240°	bow and arrow	fire	dual	Jupiter
Capricorn	मकर, makara	270°	crocodile	earth	movable	Saturn
Aquarius	कुम्भ, kumbha	300°	water-bearer	air	fixed	Saturn, Rahu
Pisces	मीन, mīna	330°	fishes	water	dual	Jupiter

Unlike Western astrology, Hindu astrology usually disregards Uranus (which rules Aquarius), Neptune (which rules Pisces), and Pluto (which rules Scorpio).

=== Nakṣhatras (lunar mansions) ===
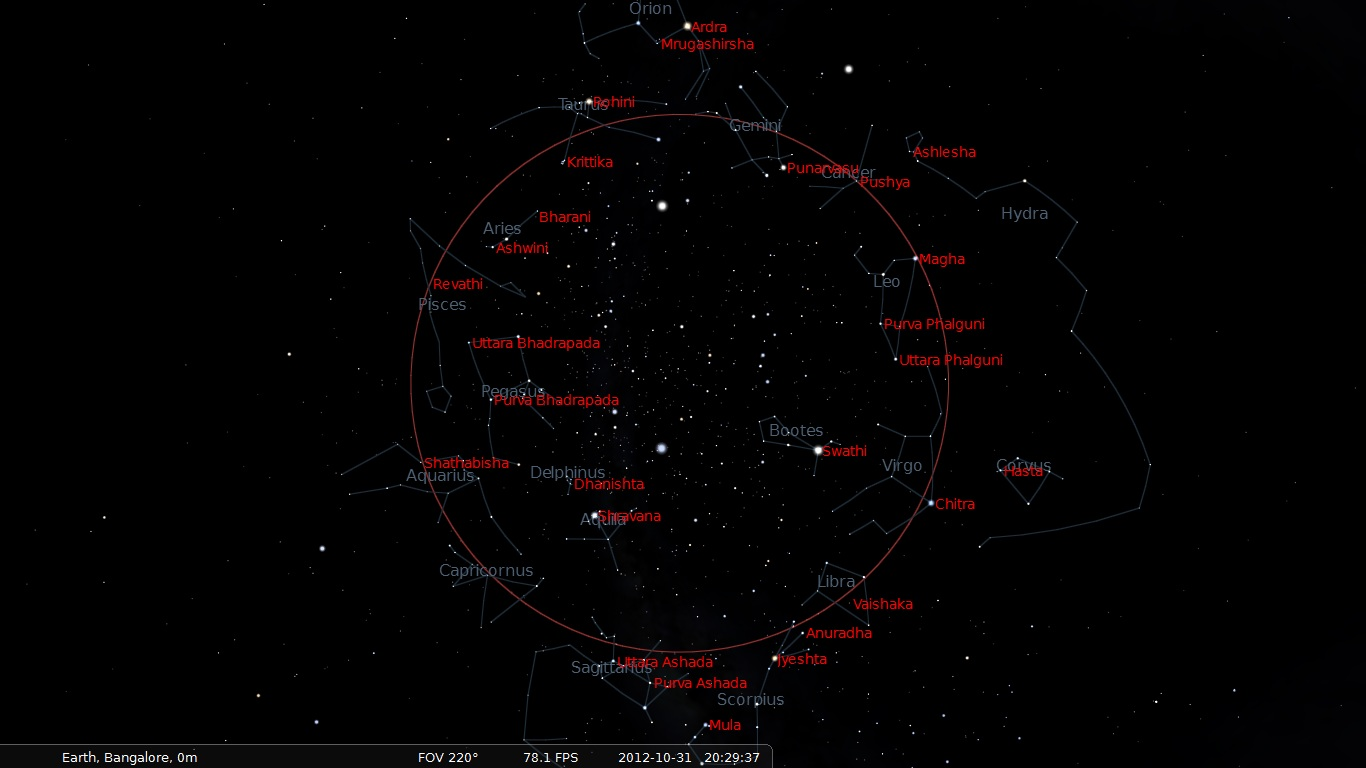
Nakshatras

The nakshatras or lunar mansions, are 27 equal divisions of the night sky used in Hindu astrology, each identified by its prominent star(s).

Historical (medieval) Hindu astrology enumerated either 27 or 28 nakṣatras. In modern astrology, a rigid system of 27 nakṣatras is generally used, each covering 13° 20′ of the ecliptic. The missing 28th nakshatra is Abhijita. Each nakṣatra is divided into equal quarters or padas of 3° 20′.

The junction of two Râshis as well as nakshatras is known as Gandanta.

=== Daśās – planetary periods ===
The word dasha (Devanāgarī: दशा, Sanskrit, daśā, 'planetary period') means 'state of being' and it is believed that the daśā largely governs the state of being of a person. The Daśā system shows which planets may be said to have become particularly active during the period of the Daśā. The ruling planet (the Daśānātha or 'lord of the Daśā') eclipses the mind of the person, compelling him or her to act per the nature of the planet.

There are several dasha systems, each with its own utility and area of application. There are Daśās of grahas (planets) as well as Daśās of the Rāśis (zodiac signs). The primary system used by astrologers is the Viṁśottarī Daśā system, which has been considered universally applicable in the Kali Yuga to all horoscopes.

The first Mahā-Daśā is determined by the position of the natal Moon in a given Nakṣatra. The lord of the Nakṣatra governs the Daśā. Each Mahā-Dāśā is divided into sub-periods called bhuktis, or antar-daśās, which are proportional divisions of the maha-dasa. Further proportional sub-divisions can be made, but error margins based on accuracy of the birth time grow exponentially. The next sub-division is called pratyantar-daśā, which can in turn be divided into sookshma-antardasa, which can in turn be divided into praana-antardaśā, which can be sub-divided into deha-antardaśā. Such sub-divisions also exist in all other Daśā systems.

=== Heavenly bodies ===
The navagraha (Sanskrit: नवग्रह, romanized: navagraha, lit. 'nine planets') are the nine celestial bodies used in Hindu astrology:

- Surya (Sun)
- Chandra (Moon)
- Budha (Mercury)
- Shukra (Venus)
- Mangala (Mars)
- Bṛhaspati or Guru (Jupiter)
- Shani (Saturn)
- Rahu (North node of the Moon)
- Ketu (South node of the Moon)

The navagraha are said to be forces that capture or eclipse the mind and the decision-making of human beings. When the grahas are active in their daśās, or periodicities they are said to be particularly empowered to direct the affairs of people and events.

Planets are held to signify major details, such as profession, marriage and longevity.

Of these indicators, known as Karakas, Parashara considers Atmakaraka the most important, signifying the broad contours of a person's life.

Rahu and Ketu correspond to the points where the moon crosses the ecliptic plane (known as the ascending and descending nodes of the moon). Classically known in Indian and Western astrology as the "head and tail of the dragon", the two are represented as a serpent-bodied demon beheaded by the Sudarshan Chakra of Vishnu after attempting to swallow the sun. They are primarily used to calculate the dates of eclipses. They are described as "shadow planets" because they are not visible in the night sky. Rahu and Ketu have an orbital cycle of 18 years and they are always retrograde in motion and 180 degrees from each other.

=== Gocharas – transits ===
A natal chart shows the positions of the grahas at the moment of birth. After that moment, the grahas move around the zodiac, interacting with the natal chart grahas. This period of interaction is called gochara (Sanskrit: gochara, 'transit').

The study of transits is based on the transit of the Moon (Chandra), which spans roughly two days, and also on the movement of Mercury (Budha) and Venus (Śukra) across the celestial sphere, which are relatively fast as viewed from Earth. The movement of the slower planets – Jupiter (Guru), Saturn (Śani) and Rāhu–Ketu — is always of considerable importance. Astrologers study the transit of the Daśā lord from various reference points in the horoscope.

==== Yogas – planetary combinations ====
In Hindu astronomy, yoga (Sanskrit: yoga, 'union') is a combination of planets placed in a specific relationship to each other.

Rāja yogas are perceived as givers of fame, status and authority, and are typically formed by the association of the Lord of Keṅdras ('quadrants'), when reckoned from the Lagna ('ascendant'), and the Lords of the Trikona ('trines', 120 degrees—first, fifth and ninth houses). The Rāja yogas are culminations of the blessings of Viṣṇu and Lakṣmī. Some planets, such as Mars for Leo Lagna, do not need another graha (or Navagraha, 'planet') to create Rājayoga, but are capable of giving Rājayoga by themselves due to their own lordship of the 4th Bhāva ('astrological house') and the 9th Bhāva from the Lagna, the two being a Keṅdra ('angular house'—first, fourth, seventh and tenth houses) and Trikona Bhāva respectively.

Dhana Yogas are formed by the association of wealth-giving planets such as the Dhaneśa or the 2nd Lord and the Lābheśa or the 11th Lord from the Lagna. Dhana Yogas are also formed due to the auspicious placement of the Dārāpada (from dara, 'spouse' and pada, 'foot'—one of the four divisions—3 degrees and 20 minutes—of a Nakshatra in the 7th house), when reckoned from the Ārūḍha Lagna (AL). The combination of the Lagneśa and the Bhāgyeśa also leads to wealth through the Lakṣmī Yoga.

Sanyāsa Yogas are formed due to the placement of four or more grahas, excluding the Sun, in a Keṅdra Bhāva from the Lagna.

There are some overarching yogas in Jyotiṣa such as Amāvasyā Doṣa, Kāla Sarpa Yoga-Kāla Amṛta Yoga and Graha Mālika Yoga that can take precedence over Yamaha yogar planetary placements in the horoscope.

=== Bhāvas – houses ===
The Hindu Jātaka or Janam Kundali or birth chart, is the bhāva chakra (Sanskrit: 'division' 'wheel'), the complete 360° circle of life, divided into houses, and represents a way of enacting the influences in the wheel. Each house has associated kāraka (Sanskrit: 'significator'), planets that can alter the interpretation of a particular house. Each bhāva spans an arc of 30° with twelve bhāvas in any chart of the horoscope. These are a crucial part of any horoscopic study since the bhāvas, understood as 'state of being', personalize the astrological signs to the native and each sign apart from indicating its true nature reveals its impact on the person based on the bhāva occupied. The best way to study the various facets of Jyotiṣa is to see their role in chart evaluation of actual persons and how these are construed.

The meanings of the bhāvas are very similar to the triplicities in Western astrology. The houses are divided into four purusharthas (Sanskrit: 'aims in life') which point to mood or meaning of the house. These four purusharthas are Dharma (duty), Artha (resources), Kama (pleasure) and Moksha (liberation). They correspond to the 12 bhavas as follows:

- Dharma – 1st, 5th and 9th bhavas – The need to find a path and purpose.
- Artha – 2nd, 6th and 10th bhavas – The need to acquire the necessary resources to fulfill that path.
- Kama – 3rd, 7th and 11th bhavas – The need for pleasure and enjoyment.
- Moksha – 4th, 8th and 12th bhavas – The need to attain liberation from the world.

These 4 aims of life are repeated in above sequence 3 times through the 12 bhavas:

- The first round, bhavas 1 through 4, show the process within the Individual.
- The second round, bhavas 5 through 8, show the alchemy in relating to other people.
- The third round, bhavas 9 through 12, show the universalization of the self.

Dharma (Duty) Houses	Artha (Resources) Houses	Kama (Pleasure) Houses	Moksha (Liberation) Houses
1	2	3	4
5	6	7	8
9	10	11	12

=== Dṛiṣṭis ===
Drishti (Sanskrit: Dṛṣṭi, 'sight') is an aspect to an entire house. Grahas cast only forward aspects, with the furthest aspect being considered the strongest. For example, Jupiter aspects the 5th, 7th and 9th house from its position, Mars aspects the 4th, 7th, and 8th houses from its position, and its 8th house.

The principle of Drishti (aspect) was devised on the basis of the aspect of an army of planets as deity and demon in a war field. Thus the Sun, a deity king with only one full aspect, is more powerful than the demon king Saturn, which has three full aspects.

Aspects can be cast both by the planets (Graha Dṛṣṭi) and by the signs (Rāśi Dṛṣṭi). Planetary aspects are a function of desire, while sign aspects are a function of awareness and cognizance.

There are some higher aspects of Graha Dṛṣṭi (planetary aspects) that are not limited to the Viśeṣa Dṛṣṭi or the special aspects. Rāśi Dṛṣṭi works based on the following formulaic structure: all movable signs aspect fixed signs except the one adjacent, and all dual and mutable signs aspect each other without exception.

=== Planetary Aspects (Graha Dṛṣṭi) ===
Each planet has a specific way of casting aspects (Drishti) on other houses from its position:

- Sun – Aspects the 7th house from its position.
- Moon – Aspects the 7th house.
- Mercury – Aspects the 7th house.
- Venus – Aspects the 7th house.
- Jupiter – Aspects the 5th, 7th, and 9th houses.
- Mars – Aspects the 4th, 7th, and 8th houses.
- Saturn – Aspects the 3rd, 7th, and 10th houses.
- Rahu – Aspects the 5th and 9th houses (some traditions).
- Ketu – Aspects the 5th and 9th houses (some traditions).

These aspects are fixed and not based on degree differences like in Western astrology. The aspect strength depends on the planet and its position.

== See also ==
- Archaeoastronomy and Vedic chronology
- Hindu cosmology
- History of astrology
- Jyotiḥśāstra
- Nadi astrology
- Panchangam
- Synoptical astrology
