= Classical planet =

Planets visible to the naked eye

A classical planet is an astronomical object that is visible to the naked eye and moves across the sky and its backdrop of fixed stars (the common stars which seem still in contrast to the planets), appearing as wandering stars. Visible to humans on Earth there are seven classical planets (the seven luminaries). They are from brightest to dimmest: the Sun, the Moon, Venus, Jupiter, Mercury, Mars and Saturn.

Greek astronomers such as Geminus and Ptolemy recorded these classical planets during classical antiquity, introducing the term planet, which means 'wanderer' in Greek (πλάνης planēs and πλανήτης planētēs), expressing the fact that these objects move across the celestial sphere relative to the fixed stars. Therefore, the Greeks were the first to document the astrological connections to the planets' visual detail.

Through the use of telescopes other celestial objects like the classical planets were found, starting with the Galilean moons in 1610. Today the term planet is used considerably differently, with a planet being defined as a natural satellite directly orbiting the Sun (or other stars) and having cleared its own orbit. Therefore, only five of the seven classical planets remain recognized as planets, alongside Earth, Uranus, and Neptune.

== History ==
=== Babylonian ===
The Babylonians recognized seven planets. A bilingual list in the British Museum records the seven Babylonian planets in the following order:

- The Moon, Sin.
- The Sun, Shamash.
- Jupiter, Merodach.
- Venus, Ishtar.
- Saturn, Ninip.
- Mercury, Nebo.
- Mars, Nergal.

=== Mandaean ===
In Mandaeism, the names of the seven planets are derived from the seven Babylonian planets. Overall, the seven classical planets (Classical Mandaic: ࡔࡅࡁࡀ, romanized: šuba, lit. 'The Seven'; ࡔࡉࡁࡉࡀࡄࡉࡀ šibiahia, "planets"; or, combined, šuba šibiahia "Seven Planets") are generally not viewed favorably in Mandaeism, since they constitute part of the entourage of Ruha, the Queen of the World of Darkness who is also their mother. However, individually, some of the planets can be associated with positive qualities. The names of the seven planets in Mandaic are borrowed from Akkadian. Some of the names are ultimately derived from Sumerian, since Akkadian had borrowed many deity names from Sumerian.

Each planet is said to be carried in a ship. Drawings of these ships are found in various Mandaean scriptures, such as the Scroll of Abatur. The planets are listed according to the traditional Mandaean order of the planets as mentioned in Masco (2012).

Planet	Mandaic	Mandaic script	Akkadian	Other names	Associations
Sun	Šamiš	ࡔࡀࡌࡉࡔ	Šamaš	Adunai ← Hebrew Adonai	light and life-powers Yawar Ziwa (Dazzling Light) and Simat Hayyi (Treasure of Life); Yazuqaeans
Venus	Libat	ࡋࡉࡁࡀࡕ	Delebat	Amamit (the underworld goddess), Argiuat, Daitia, Kukbat (the diminutive of 'star'), Spindar, ʿstira (i.e., Ishtar or Astarte), and Ruha or Ruha ḏ-qudša (Holy Spirit)	success in love and reproduction
Mercury	Nbu (ʿNbu)	ࡍࡁࡅ ࡏࡍࡁࡅ	Nabû	Maqurpiil, Mšiha ← Messiah; ʿaṭarid ← Arabic	learning, scribes; Christ and Christianity
Moon	Sin	ࡎࡉࡍ	Sīnu	Agzʿil, Ṭaṭmʿil, Ṣaurʿil, and Sira	miscarriages and abnormal births
Saturn	Kiwan	ࡊࡉࡅࡀࡍ	Kayyamānu	Br Šamiš (The Son of the Sun)	Jews; Saturday
Jupiter	Bil	ࡁࡉࡋ	Bēlu	Angʿil	male; "hot and moist"
Mars	Nirig	ࡍࡉࡓࡉࡂ	Nergallu	Marik	violence; Islam

== Symbols ==
The astrological symbols for the classical planets appear in the medieval Byzantine codices in which many ancient horoscopes were preserved. In the original papyri of these Greek horoscopes, there are found a circle with one ray for the Sun and a crescent for the Moon. The written symbols for Mercury, Venus, Jupiter, and Saturn have been traced to forms found in late Greek papyri. The symbols for Jupiter and Saturn are identified as monograms of the initial letters of the corresponding Greek names, and the symbol for Mercury is a stylized caduceus.

A. S. D. Maunder finds antecedents of the planetary symbols in earlier sources, used to represent the gods associated with the classical planets. Bianchini's planisphere, produced in the 2nd century, shows Greek personifications of planetary gods charged with early versions of the planetary symbols: Mercury has a caduceus; Venus has, attached to her necklace, a cord connected to another necklace; Mars, a spear; Jupiter, a staff; Saturn, a scythe; the Sun, a circlet with rays radiating from it; and the Moon, a headdress with a crescent attached. A diagram in Johannes Kamateros' 12th century Compendium of Astrology shows the Sun represented by the circle with a ray, Jupiter by the letter zeta (the initial of Zeus, Jupiter's counterpart in Greek mythology), Mars by a shield crossed by a spear, and the remaining classical planets by symbols resembling the modern ones, without the cross-mark seen in modern versions of the symbols. The modern Sun symbol, pictured as a circle with a dot (☉), first appeared in the Renaissance.

== Planetary hours ==
The Ptolemaic system used in ancient Greek astronomy placed the planets by order of proximity to Earth in the then-current geocentric model, closest to furthest, as the Moon, Mercury, Venus, Sun, Mars, Jupiter, and Saturn. In addition the day was divided into seven-hour intervals, each ruled by one of the planets, although the order was staggered (see below).

The first hour of each day was named after the ruling planet, giving rise to the names and order of the Roman seven-day week. Modern Latin-based cultures, in general, directly inherited the days of the week from the Romans and they were named after the classical planets; for example, in Spanish Miércoles is Mercury, and in French mardi is Mars-day.

The modern English days of the week were mostly inherited from gods of the old Germanic Norse culture – Wednesday is Wōden’s-day (Wōden or Wettin eqv. Mercury), Thursday is Thor’s-day (Thor eqv. Jupiter), Friday is Frige-day (Frige eqv. Venus). Equivalence here is by the gods' roles; for instance, Venus and Frige were both goddesses of love. It can be correlated that the Norse gods were attributed to each Roman planet and its god, probably due to Roman influence rather than coincidentally by the naming of the planets. A vestige of the Roman convention remains in the English name Saturday.

Weekday	Planet	Greek god	Germanic god		Weekday
French name	Roman god	Greek name	Norse name	Saxon name	English name
dimanche	Sol	Helios	Sól	Sunne	Sunday
lundi	Luna	Selene	Máni	Mōnda	Monday
mardi	Mars	Ares	Týr	Tīw	Tuesday
mercredi	Mercury	Hermes	Óðinn	Wōden / Wettin	Wednesday
jeudi	Jupiter	Zeus	Þórr	Thunor	Thursday
vendredi	Venus	Aphrodite	Frigg	Frige	Friday
samedi	Saturn	Cronus	Njörðr	Njord	Saturday

== Alchemy ==
In alchemy, each classical planet (Moon, Mercury, Venus, Sun, Mars, Jupiter, and Saturn) was associated with one of the seven metals known to the classical world. As a result, the alchemical glyphs for the metal and associated planet coincide. Alchemists believed the other elemental metals were variants of these seven (e.g. zinc was known as "Indian tin" or "mock silver").

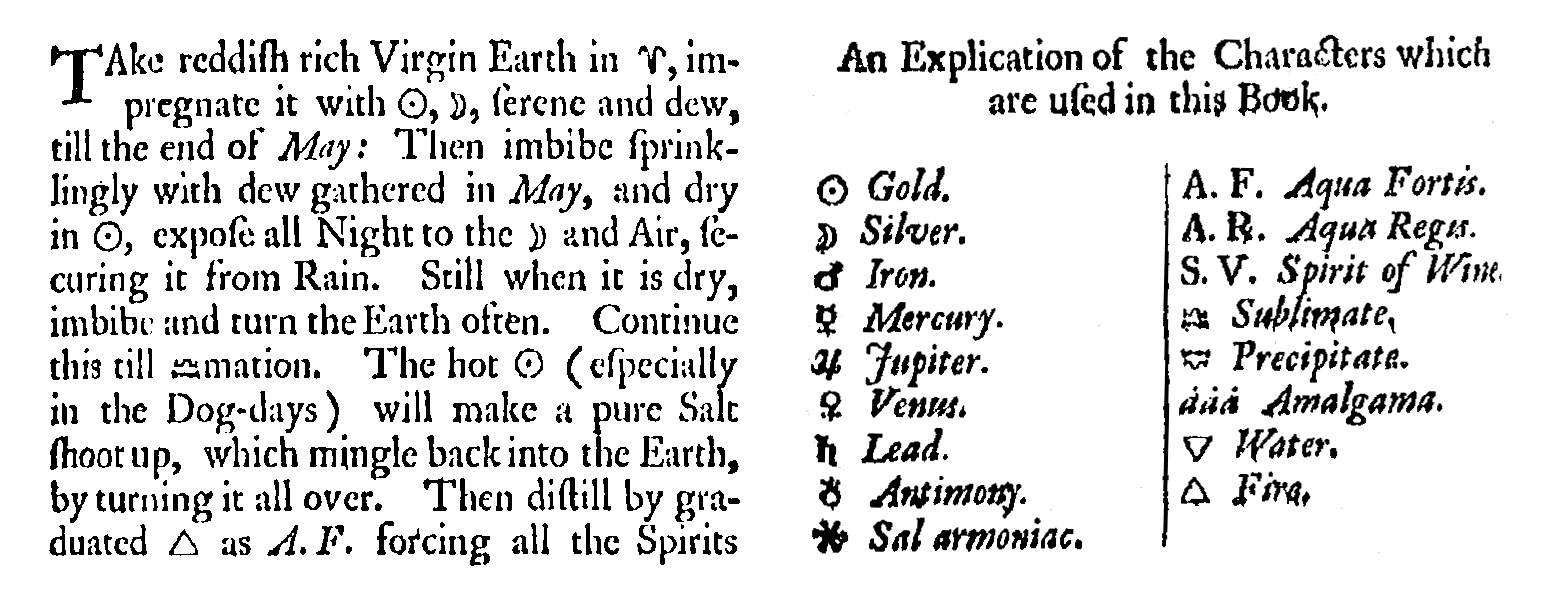
Extract and symbol key from 17th-century alchemy text

Alchemy in the Western World and other locations where it was widely practiced was (and in many cases still is) allied and intertwined with traditional Babylonian-Greek style astrology; in numerous ways they were built to complement each other in the search for hidden knowledge (knowledge that is not common i.e. the occult). Astrology has used the concept of classical elements from antiquity up until the present day today. Most modern astrologers use the four classical elements extensively, and indeed they are still viewed as a critical part of interpreting the astrological chart.

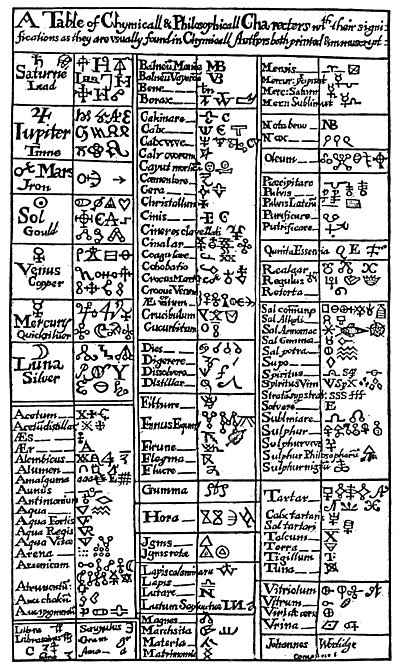
A table of alchemical symbols from Basil Valentine’s The Last Will and Testament, 1670 CE

Some alchemists (e.g. Paracelsus) adopted the Hermetic Qabalah assignment between the vital organs and the planets as follows:

Planet	Organ
Sun	Heart
Moon	Brain
Mercury	Lungs
Venus	Kidneys
Mars	Gallbladder
Jupiter	Liver
Saturn	Spleen

== Contemporary astrology ==
=== Western astrology ===
Astrology: The Thema Mundi shows the naked-eye planets in their domicile.

Planet	Domicile sign(s)	Detriment sign(s)	Exaltation sign	Fall sign
Sun	Leo	Aquarius	Aries	Libra
Moon	Cancer	Capricorn	Taurus	Scorpio
Mercury	Gemini (diurnal) and Virgo (nocturnal)	Sagittarius (diurnal) and Pisces (nocturnal)	Virgo	Pisces
Venus	Libra (diurnal) and Taurus (nocturnal)	Aries (diurnal) and Scorpio (nocturnal)	Pisces	Virgo
Mars	Aries (diurnal) and Scorpio (nocturnal)	Libra (diurnal) and Taurus (nocturnal)	Capricorn	Cancer
Jupiter	Sagittarius (diurnal) and Pisces (nocturnal)	Gemini (diurnal) and Virgo (nocturnal)	Cancer	Capricorn
Saturn	Aquarius (diurnal) and Capricorn (nocturnal)	Leo (diurnal) and Cancer (nocturnal)	Libra	Aries

=== Indian astrology ===
Indian astronomy and astrology (jyotiṣa) recognise seven visible planets (including the Sun and Moon) and two additional invisible planets (tamograha).

Sanskrit Name	English name	Nakshatras	Guna	Represents	Day
Surya (सूर्य)	Sun	Krittika, Uttara Phalguni and Uttara Ashadha	Sattva	Soul, king, highly placed persons, father, ego	Sunday
Chandra (चंद्र)	Moon	Rohini, Hasta and Shravana	Sattva	Emotional Mind, queen, mother.	Monday
Mangala (मंगल)	Mars	Mrigashira, Chitra and Dhanishta	Tamas	energy, action, confidence	Tuesday
Budha (बुध)	Mercury	Ashlesha, Jyeshta and Revati	Rajas	Communication and analysis, mind	Wednesday
Brihaspati (बृहस्पति)	Jupiter	Punarvasu, Vishakha and Purva Bhadrapada	Sattva	the great teacher, wealth, Expansion, progeny	Thursday
Shukra (शुक्र)	Venus	Bharani, Purva Phalguni and Purva Ashadha	Rajas	Feminine, pleasure and reproduction, Luxury, Love, Spouse	Friday
Shani (शनि)	Saturn	Pushya, Anuradha and Uttara Bhadrapada	Tamas	learning the hard way. Career and Longevity, Contraction	Saturday
Rahu (राहु)	Ascending/North Lunar Node	Ardra, Swati and Shatabhisha	Tamas	an Asura who does his best to plunge any area of one's life he controls into chaos, works on the subconscious level	none
Ketu (केतु)	Descending/South Lunar Node	Ashwini, Magha and Mula	Tamas	supernatural influences, works on the subconscious level	none

=== Chinese astrology ===
Chinese astronomy and astrology recognise seven visible planets (including the Sun and Moon). Chinese astrology flourished during the Han dynasty (2nd century BC to 2nd century AD).

English name	Associated element	Chinese Characters	Chinese pinyin	Old astronomical names
Mars	Fire	火星	Huǒxīng	Yínghuò (熒惑)
Mercury	Water	水星	Shuǐxīng	Chénxīng (辰星)
Jupiter	Wood	木星	Mùxīng	Suìxīng (歲星)
Venus	Metal or Gold	金星	Jīnxīng	Tàibái (太白)
Saturn	Earth or Soil	土星	Tǔxīng	Zhènxīng (鎮星)

== Naked-eye planets ==
Mercury and Venus are visible only in twilight hours because their orbits are interior to that of Earth. Venus is the third-brightest object in the sky and the most prominent planet. Mercury is more difficult to see due to its proximity to the Sun. Lengthy twilight and an extremely low angle at maximum elongations make optical filters necessary to see Mercury from extreme polar locations. Mars is at its brightest when it is in opposition, which occurs approximately every twenty-five months. Jupiter and Saturn are the largest of the five planets, but they are farther from the Sun and, therefore, receive less sunlight. Nonetheless, Jupiter is often the next brightest object in the sky after Venus. Saturn's luminosity is often enhanced by its rings, which reflect light to varying degrees depending on their inclination to the ecliptic; however, the rings themselves are not visible to the naked eye from the Earth.

== See also ==
- Antikythera mechanism
- Behenian fixed star
- List of former planets
- List of Mesopotamian deities § Major deities
- Monas Hieroglyphica of John Dee
- Olympian spirits
- Worship of heavenly bodies
- Wufang Shangdi (the Classical planets in Chinese mythology).
- Navagraha (the Classical planets in Hindu mythology).
