= Decan (astrology) =

Subdivision of an astrological sign

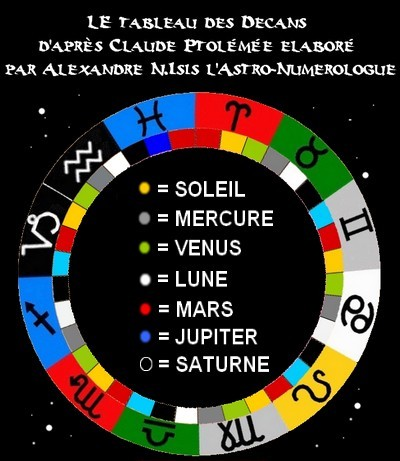
The 36 decans of Claudius Ptolemy.

In astrology, a decan (or decanate) is the subdivision of a sign. In order to give fuller interpretation to the zodiac signs, ancient astrologers subdivided each sign into periods of approximately ten days. These divisions are known as the "decans" or "decanates" and cover modifications of individual traits, attributed to minor planetary influences, which temper or blend with the ruling influence of the period. The ten-day spans are somewhat arbitrary in order to allow for the five (and sometimes six) extra days in the year beyond the 360 days required for the thirty-six decans.

Each sign is allocated a triplicity, consisting of three of the four classical elements air, water, earth or fire, and is therefore subdivided into three equal parts of 10 degrees each.

Each decan of a sign is assigned rulership by the planet ruling the sign and secondary rulership by the planet ruling the decan.

== In Ptolemy ==
The decans and their rulers are assigned as follows as based on the description by the Alexandrian Egyptian astrologer, Ptolemy, from whose Tetrabiblos are derived most of the principles of western astrology:

Sign	Domicile ruler	Exaltation ruler	0–10 degrees	10–20 degrees	20–30 degrees
Aries	Mars	Sun	Mars	Sun	Venus
Taurus	Venus	Moon	Mercury	Moon	Saturn
Gemini	Mercury	N/A	Jupiter	Mars	Sun
Cancer	Moon	Jupiter	Venus	Mercury	Moon
Leo	Sun	N/A	Saturn	Jupiter	Mars
Virgo	Mercury	Mercury	Sun	Venus	Mercury
Libra	Venus	Saturn	Moon	Saturn	Jupiter
Scorpio	Mars	N/A	Mars	Sun	Venus
Sagittarius	Jupiter	N/A	Mercury	Moon	Saturn
Capricorn	Saturn	Mars	Jupiter	Mars	Sun
Aquarius	Saturn	N/A	Venus	Mercury	Moon
Pisces	Jupiter	Venus	Saturn	Jupiter	Mars

== Traditional Chaldean rulerships ==
"The Faces of the Planets" * (Lilly)
Sign	First Decan ruler (0–9.999 deg.)	Second Decan ruler (10–19.999 deg.)	Third Decan ruler (20–29.999 deg.)
Aries	Mars	Sun	Venus
Taurus	Mercury	Moon	Saturn
Gemini	Jupiter	Mars	Sun
Cancer	Venus	Mercury	Moon
Leo	Saturn	Jupiter	Mars
Virgo	Sun	Venus	Mercury
Libra	Moon	Saturn	Jupiter
Scorpio	Mars	Sun	Venus
Sagittarius	Mercury	Moon	Saturn
Capricorn	Jupiter	Mars	Sun
Aquarius	Venus	Mercury	Moon
Pisces	Saturn	Jupiter	Mars

* as used as an essential dignity in astrology.

Notice that rulerships follow a repeating pattern, the Chaldaean order of the planets: Saturn, Jupiter, Mars, Sun, Venus, Mercury, Moon, based on a geocentric cosmological model.

== Modern rulerships ==
Modern astrology updates the rulerships. Decans or "faces" are the least important of the essential dignities, representing about one-fifteenth of a planet's overall strength in medieval astrology.

The decans and their rulers are assigned as follows as based on the concepts of modern Western astrology :

Sign	1st decan ruler	2nd decan ruler	3rd decan ruler
Aries	Mars	Sun	Jupiter
Taurus	Venus	Mercury	Saturn
Gemini	Mercury	Venus	Uranus
Cancer	Moon	Pluto	Neptune
Leo	Sun	Jupiter	Mars
Virgo	Mercury	Saturn	Venus
Libra	Venus	Uranus	Mercury
Scorpio	Pluto	Neptune	Moon
Sagittarius	Jupiter	Mars	Sun
Capricorn	Saturn	Venus	Mercury
Aquarius	Uranus	Mercury	Venus
Pisces	Neptune	Moon	Pluto

== See also ==
- Decans in the Chinese zodiac
