= Vakri grahas =

Concept in Hindu astrology

In Hindu astrology, Vakri grahas are those planets of the Solar System other than the Sun and the Moon that appear to move backwards, which apparent motion is due to Earth’s orbit. Vakri in Sanskrit means twisted or crooked; it also means indirect, evasive and ambiguous. A Vakri graha is also known as the Saktha graha. Vakragati confers exceptional i.e. Cheshtabala, to Vakra grahas whose strong influence is expressed by the manner they affect the Natal Chart and by their transits. The two Lunar Nodes have perpetual retrograde motion.

== Vakragati ==
Vakragati means retrograde motion. As the Earth passes by a planet that particular planet appears to move backwards i.e. westward, amid the stars, this phenomenon is called retrograde motion, which motion invariably occurs at a time when that planet is visible for a relatively longer period. the approximate midpoint of which period in respect of the superior planets coincides with opposition and the Earth is between the Sun and that planet. However, retrograde motion of a planet is merely an illusion, the planet only appears to retrograde, actually it does not and in which event if the faster planet is retrograde it can approach the slower planet from a later degree by backward motion which phenomenon is known as - "the applying aspect" in the Western astrology and the "Tajika System".

The Sun and the Moon, the two luminaries, do not have Vakra state, they do not acquire retrograde motion, the other five planets (Tara grahas) have Vakra state, they acquire retrograde motion from time to time when they transit from 5th to the 8th house from the Sun. Rahu and Ketu, which are not planets in true sense, have perpetual retrograde motion. Suryasiddhanta refers to eight varieties of motion of which Vakra, Ativakra and Kutila refer to Vakragati i.e. retrograde motion, when they are believed to be moving away from light, and the remaining five verities viz; manda, manda tara, sama, sighra and atisighra refer to Rujugati i.e. direct motion, when planets are freed from vakragati and are known as Margi grahas that are believed to be moving towards light. A planet hemmed between two Vakri grahas behaves as a Vakri graha, this applies to the Moon. Whereas Mars, Jupiter and Saturn appear to retrograde in the signs opposite to the one occupied by the Sun, Mercury and Venus appear to retrograde when they are farthest away from the Sun. Mercury and Venus can never be in the 5th to the 8th house from the Sun. According to Sanketa Nidhi of Ramadayalu when it is retrograde Mars gives the results of the 3rd house from the house of its occupation, Mercury gives the results of the 4th, Jupiter of the 5th, Venus of the 7th and Saturn of the 8th house. Vakri grahas and Paramuchcha grahas no doubt gain superior strength but do not produce identical results and even become over-powered in Grahayuddhas. If the Sun is Arohi a Vakri graha although very strong but because of the variations in its motion does not produce results uniformly. Situated in their debilitation sign if owning good houses Vakri grahas produce good results, if owning bad houses they give bad results. Phaladeepika holds the view that a retrograde planet in its sign of debilitation is equal to its occupation of exaltation sign, and that exalted retrograde planets act as though they are debilitated. And, excepting the retrograde ones, those planets which occupy unfriendly signs take away 1/3rd of their allotted term of life. Vakra also means Kuja (Mars). Vakri grahas having gained exceptional strength give thrice the term of life allotted to them.

== Vakri grahas and their implications ==
Vakri grahas or retrograde planets do not always produce bad results, they impel reconsideration of functions associated with them. When planets are retrograde their power to do good or bad is enhanced, then benefic planets become more benevolent and malefic planets more malevolent. However, Phaladeepika makes no such distinction. Saravali holding the view that exalted planets when retrograde have no strength, tells us that whereas retrograde benefics confer kingship, retrograde malefics give misery and aimless wandering. Uttara Kalamrita agrees with the view that Vakragati is equal to exaltation, if a planet joins a Vakri graha its strength is reduced by half, if retrogression is in own sign of exaltation then the Vakri graha acts as though debilitated, if it is debilitated and also retrograde it acts as though it is exalted.

A retrograde planet at the time of birth affects a person immensely by its qualities. If more than one planet is retrograde then the planet most advanced in a sign affects the most. An exalted planet when retrograde certainly loses its power to help but a debilitated planet which is retrograde becomes more helpful in many possible ways; in fact the debilitated and retrograde planet situated in its exaltation navamsa becomes very helpful. Natural benefics i.e. Mercury, Venus and Jupiter, if owning the 4th, the 7th or the 10th house and retrograde become more adverse and spoil the house they own, occupy and aspect. On the other hand natural malefics such as the Mars and Saturn, become more helpful. Retrograde Jupiter gives results of the bhava it occupied at birth, rest give the results of the bhava in which they began retrograding.

Immediately prior to assuming retrograde motion and direct motion planets seem to be stationary. Thus, Saturn remains retrograde for 140 days and stationary 5 days before and after; Jupiter for 120 days, stationary for 3 or 4 days; Venus for 42 days and stationary for two days and Mercury remains retrograde for 24 days and stationary for one day before and after. Retrograde planets influence the primary structure of the human consciousness and its relationship with human life. Vakri grahas confer unexpected results. Thus, Saturn, the friendly and functionally benefic yogakaraka for Taurus Lagna situated in Taurus lagna as the lord of 10th when retrograde in transit it delayed the appointment in service of a native who was at that time experiencing the good effects of Jupiter dasa.

Vakri grahas give the effect of the house previous to the one they are positioned in. For example, if Saturn is in Aquarius sign it will also give results of its occupation of Capricorn sign and therefore, it will then cast its 7th house-aspect on both the opposite signs, Leo and Cancer. Accordingly, during their vakra gati Saturn, Mars and Jupiter, all three, in addition to their respective three special aspects gain a fourth aspect.

Mars retrogrades within the arc-distance of 164 - 196 degrees away from the Sun, Venus retrogrades within the arc-distance of 163 - 197 degrees away from the Sun, Mercury does so within the arc-distance of 144 - 216 degrees, Jupiter does so within the arc-distance of 130 - 230 degrees and Saturn, within the arc-distance of 115 - 245 degrees away from the Sun. Agastaya states that Vakragati (retrograde motion), in general, intensifies the effects of planets for good or evil, according to their functional attributes and overall disposition at the time of birth or query, and a malefic planet, exalted and retrograde, and otherwise invested with yogas, can confer both Raja yoga during its Dasha or in the Dasha of a planet which happens to occupy the nakshatra of the malefic concerned, and also throw him out of power or inflict very adverse effects.
