= Rulership =

Rulership may refer to:

- The position or quality of a ruler, see also Sovereignty
- A government or the territory under its control
- In astrology, the influence of a planet, see also Domicile (astrology)
- A thoroughbred racehorse, Rulership (horse)
