= Asteroids in astrology =

Asteroids are relatively new to astrology, having only been discovered in the 19th century. Their use has become significant to a few Western astrologers yet still only a minority of astrologers use the asteroids in chart interpretation. Their use in astrology began with Eleanor Bach's publication of the first asteroid ephemeris in 1973. Their use was popularized following Demetria George's publication of Asteroid Goddesses in 1986.

== The first four ==
Ceres, Pallas, Juno and Vesta (in order of discovery) were the only known asteroids from 1808 until 1845, when additional asteroids began to be discovered. They started being recognized by astrologers in the 1970s.

=== Ceres ===

1 Ceres was the first asteroid discovered and now is labeled as a dwarf planet, taking up about 1/3 of the entire mass of the asteroid belt. Although historically classified as an asteroid, Ceres was reclassified by the International Astronomical Union in 2006 as a dwarf planet. In astrology it is still often discussed within the group of so-called "asteroids", where it is sometimes informally referred to as the "queen of the asteroids" due to its size and symbolic prominence, despite its astronomical status as a dwarf planet. (According to some astrologers, to get an understanding of the nature of a planet, astrologers may study the characteristics and positions of known planets at the time of discovery, observe the trend of significant events at the time, and evaluate over time what the newly discovered celestial body tends to relate to in the charts of living people.) In mythology Ceres was the Roman equivalent of the Greek goddess Demeter. She was the goddess of agriculture and when her daughter Persephone was kidnapped by Pluto in an attempt to force her to marry him, Demeter became so distraught looking for her daughter that she neglected the Earth which became cold and most plants died. This was the first autumn and winter season, which came back every year even after Persephone had been saved by Hermes because she had eaten a pomegranate that made her Pluto's wife forever, and he demanded she return to him once a year. These myths, including the fact that Ceres is the roundest asteroid (it resembles the Moon) signify that in astrology the placement of Ceres in a birth chart is said to show what the native needs to feel loved and nurtured.

=== Pallas ===

2 Pallas, sometimes known as "Pallas Athene", is the second asteroid discovered and the third in mass. There are many Pallases in mythology. Some sources say Pallas was Triton's daughter and Athena's playmate who was killed and Athena mourned her by changing her name to Pallas and making a wooden statue of her, which Zeus dropped to the Land of Troy where a temple was built in its honor. Others say that Pallas was an old god who combined with Athena. In these respects, Pallas can be interpreted as an indicator of effort. Other astrologers interpret it as an indicator of wisdom, intelligence, healing (perhaps through effort) as the titan named Pallas was a god of these things. This asteroid, like Vesta, is also sometimes called an influencer of Virgo.

=== Juno ===

3 Juno was the third to be discovered and is 9th in mass ranking (1 Ceres, 2 Pallas, 4 Vesta, 10 Hygiea, 511 Davida, 704 Interamnia, 65 Cybele, 52 Europa are considerably bigger and more massive). In mythology Juno is the Roman equivalent of the Greek Hera. Hera was a very important goddess in both Greek and Roman culture. She was a wife of Zeus and hailed as the Queen of Gods and Zeus' main concubine (at least the myths imply that this was what she thought herself). She was the goddess of marriages, unions, and was also associated with finance and found cows and peacocks to be sacred. She was also very jealous and aggressive, especially when Zeus was involved with another woman; she would often kill the children Zeus and the other women or goddesses would create together, including attempts to kill Hercules and Dionysus—or the woman herself. For these reasons, Juno is used in astrology as an indicator of what a native requires to feel satisfied in love or romance, or what is one needs in order to feel their marriage is successful and satisfying. It is often in aspect between the charts of spouses. Because of Juno's association with relationships, money, cows and jealousy, it also appears to have an influence of the sign Taurus. [Citation Needed]

=== Vesta ===

4 Vesta is the second largest in mass, fourth to be discovered of which it is the fastest to travel the zodiac and the last asteroid to be counted as a planet. In mythology Vesta the virgin goddess, the Roman version of Hestia, though she was of higher importance to the Romans, was regarded as one of the most important goddesses of all, though ironically she never was depicted in any visual art (in Greece, some vases with her image however have been found), or at least none of it has ever been found. She was the goddess of hearth, when a baby was born she was the goddess they would ask to bless it and protect the home. In every city and home in Rome there was a sacred fire made to Vesta that was protected and not allowed to go out. Astrologers use Vesta to determine what it is that you are devoted to and how your sexuality will develop. Vesta, having been a protective virgin goddess is said by some to be an influencer of the sign Virgo, this is accepted by many in the astrological community, but many prefer to — instead of calling the influence an outright rulership — call it an "affinity" or simply do not support this claim. It also seems to bear influence over Scorpio.

== Other asteroids ==
After the first four asteroids were discovered, there wouldn't be another discovered for 38 years (Astraea). The first four gained popularity as full-fledged planets, but the rapid development of telescopes led to new asteroids being frequently discovered in what is now known as the main-belt, and they started being called minor planets.

=== Hygiea ===

The asteroid Hygiea was the 10th discovered and is fourth in mass ranking. In mythology Hygieia was the feminine part and the consort of Asclepios, the Greek god of medicine and a mythological healer strongly connected to the Solar cult of Apollo. It seems that Hygiea rules the health practices and is integrated into medical astrology, but in her negative side has something to bring in cases of depression and anxiety of a higher level than usual. The status of Hygiea is practically unknown at the moment in western astrology.

=== Chiron and the centaurs ===

The centaurs were recognized as a distinct population with the discovery of 2060 Chiron in 1977. It was initially announced as the tenth planet, and received attention from astrologers. A few astrologers have investigated other centaurs, Chiron, being the most researched and used. 5145 Pholus has become increasingly used and associated with the phrase 'small cause big effect.'

== See also ==
- Planets in astrology
- Stars in astrology
