= Thema Mundi =

Beginnings in Hellenistic astrology

The Thema Mundi.

The Thema Mundi ("World Theme", with 'theme' being a word that also means chart) was a mythical horoscope used in Hellenistic astrology that shows the supposed positions of the seven visible planets (including the Sun and Moon) at the beginning of the universe. It purports to exemplify the logic behind the sign rulerships, exaltations, and meanings of the aspects, among other things. The purely symbolic nature of the chart is readily perceived from the impossible positions of Venus and Mercury in it. In the late Middle Ages there has been a confusion between a horoscope of the world and the thema mundi.

The chart significantly diverges from the theory that the houses and the signs are directly correlated. Modern astrology assumes that Aries, the first sign, conveys its character to the first house. Instead, the thema mundi has Cancer in the ascendant, suggesting that nature, rather than being aggressive (in correspondence to Aries and Mars), is nurturing (in accord with the symbolism of Cancer and the Moon).

== Structure ==
The Thema Mundi shows:

- Cancer rising, with the Moon in Cancer
- The Sun in Leo
- Mercury in Virgo
- Venus in Libra
- Mars in Scorpio
- Jupiter in Sagittarius
- Saturn in Capricorn

== Rationale ==
The Thema Mundi's structure provided a backing for many of the concepts in Hellenistic astrology.

=== Planetary domiciles ===
The Sun and Moon, the two luminaries, are assigned to the two signs that correspond to the brightest and warmest times of the year in the Northern Hemisphere, Cancer and Leo. The other planets are assigned to signs by halving the zodiac between Cancer and Leo and assigning each planet to one sign on the solar half and each on the lunar half. Mercury is assigned to the two signs next to the luminaries, Gemini and Virgo, because it never travels more than one sign away from the Sun. Venus is assigned to the next two signs, Taurus and Libra, because it never gets more than two signs away. Jupiter and Mars are assigned to their signs Sagittarius and Pisces, and Aries and Scorpio, respectively, in this same way. Finally, Saturn is assigned to Capricorn and Aquarius because of the cold and lack of light during this time of the year.

=== Astrological aspects ===
The natures of astrological aspects are determined by the planets' configurations to the luminaries in the Thema Mundi. In it, the aspects made by the planets correlate with their benefic or malefic classification:

- Saturn makes an opposition (180°) to the Moon, and so the opposition is said to be of the nature of Saturn. Saturn is the greater of the two malefics, and so the opposition is the most negative and harmful of the two negative aspects.
- Mars makes a square (90°) to the Sun, so the square is said to be of the nature of Mars. Mars is the lesser malefic, so the square is the least negative of the two aspects.
- Jupiter is making a trine (120°) to the Sun, so the trine's nature is that of Jupiter. Since Jupiter is the greater of the two benefics, the trine is said to be the most desirable positive aspect.
- Venus is making a sextile (60°) to the Sun and thus the sextile is of the nature of Venus, the weaker of the two benefics.
- Mercury is making a semi-sextile (30°, or half a sextile) to both the Sun and Venus, along with a sextile (60°) to both the Moon and Mars.

== Actual Dates with such Constellations ==
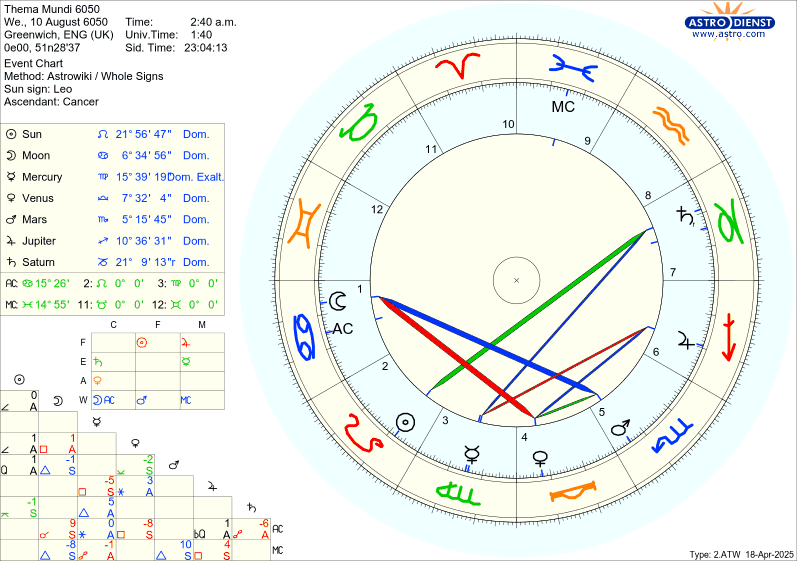
Thema Mundi chart 10 August 6050

The JPL Ephemeris permits exact calculation of planetary positions between the years 13'000 BCE and 17'000 CE. During this period there is only one date when the seven classical planets are placed in the signs according to the Thema Mundi chart above, though not at 15° of each sign. This is on 10 or 11 August 6050 CE.

In astrology, Saturn does not only rule the sign of Capricorn, but also that of Aquarius. Jupiter is ruler of both, Sagittarius and Pisces, Mars is ruler of Scorpio and Aries. If one takes these alternative rulerships into account, there exist three more possible dates for a Thema Mundi approximation: 19 August 1903, 3 September 2130 BCE and 28 September 4835 BCE.

== See also ==
- Domicile (astrology)
- Planets in astrology
