= Planets in astrology =

Interpretations of the planets of the Solar System

In astrology, planets have a meaning different from the astronomical understanding of what a planet is. Before the age of telescopes, the night sky was thought to consist of two similar components: fixed stars, which remained motionless in relation to each other, and moving objects/"wandering stars" (Ancient Greek: ἀστέρες πλανῆται, romanized: asteres planetai), which moved relative to the fixed stars over the course of the year(s).

To the Ancient Greeks who learned from the Babylonians, the earliest astronomers/astrologers, this group consisted of the five planets visible to the naked eye and excluded Earth, plus the Sun and Moon. Although the Greek term planet applied mostly to the five 'wandering stars', the ancients included the Sun and Moon as the Sacred 7 Luminaires/7 Heavens (sometimes referred to as "Lights",) making a total of 7 planets. The ancient Babylonians, Greeks, Persians, Romans, Medieval Christians, and others thought of the 7 classical planets as gods and named their 7 days of the week after them. Astrologers retain this definition of the 7 classical planets today.

To ancient astrologers, the planets represented the will of the deities and their direct influence upon human affairs. To modern astrologers, the planets can represent basic drives or urges in the subconscious, or energy flow regulators representing dimensions of experience. They express themselves with different qualities in the 12 signs of the zodiac and in the 12 houses. The planets are also related to each other in the form of aspects.

Modern astrologers differ on the source of the correlations between planetary positions and configurations, on the one hand, and characteristics and destinies of the natives, on the other. Hone writes that the planets exert it directly through gravitation or another, unknown influence. Others hold that the planets have no direct influence on themselves, but are mirrors of basic organizing principles in the universe. In other words, the basic patterns of the universe repeat themselves everywhere, in a fractal-like fashion, and as above, so below. Therefore, the patterns that the planets make in the sky reflect the ebb and flow of basic human impulses. The planets are also associated, especially in the Chinese tradition, with the basic forces of nature.

Listed below are the specific meanings and domains associated with the astrological planets since ancient times, with the main focus on the Western astrological tradition. The planets in Hindu astrology are known as the Navagraha (literally "nine planets"), with the addition of two shadow bodies Rahu and Ketu. In Chinese astrology, the planets are associated with the life forces of Yin & Yang and the five elements, which play an important role in the Chinese form of geomancy known as Feng Shui. Astrologers differ on the signs associated with each planet's exaltation, especially for the outer, non-classical planets.

== Planetary symbolism ==
This table shows the astrological planets (as distinct from the astronomical) and the Greek and Roman deities associated with them. In most cases, the English name for planets derives from the name of a Roman god or goddess. Also of interest is the conflation of the Roman god with a similar Greek god. In some cases, it is the same deity with two different names.

Celestial body	Symbol	Roman deity	Greek God	Babylonian God	Armenian God	Hindu God	Egyptian God	Connection	Meaning (European)	Meaning (Vedic)
Sun	☉	Sol	Ἥλιος (Helios); Ἀπόλλων (Apollo)	𒀭𒌓 (Shamash)	Արև (Arev)	सूर्य (Surya)	Ra; Horus	ancient	God of Prophecy and Solar Incarnation; Helios means "sun."	The Sun God. Associated with ego, sense of purpose, and vitality. Son of Aditi and sage Kashyapa; Surya means "the supreme light."
Moon	☾	Luna; Diana	Σελήνη (Selene); Ἄρτεμις (Artemis)	𒂗𒍪 (Sin)	Լուսին (Lusin)	चंद्र (Chandra)	Khonsu	ancient	Goddess of Hunting and Lunar Incarnation; Selene means "moon."	The Moon God. Associated with emotions, the mother, and motherly instincts. Chandra means "shining."
Mercury	☿	Mercury	ʽἙρμῆς (Hermes)	𒀭𒀝 (Nabu)	Լուծ (Luć)	बुध (Budha)	Thoth	ancient	God of messengers, travel, and/or commerce.	A planet god known for his preserving and protecting nature to mankind and manhood. Associated with communication, wit, and cleverness.
Venus	♀	Venus	Ἀφροδίτη (Aphrodite) [Κύπριδα (Cypris)] [Κυθέρεια (Cytherea)]	𒀭𒈹 (Inanna)	Եղջերու (Yełjeru)	शुक्र (Shukra)	Isis; Hathor	ancient	Goddess of romance and lust; Venus means "love" and/or "sexual desire."	The mentor of Asuras. Associated with fertility, beauty, and enthusiasm. Always helped demons in the war against gods; Shukra means "clear, pure, brightness, or clearness."
Mars	♂	Mars	Ἀρης (Ares)	𒀭𒄊𒀕𒃲 (Nergal)	Ծկրավորի (Ćkravori)	मंगल (Mangala)	Anhur	ancient	God of War	Son of Earth. Associated with auspicious occasions. Also associated with strength, aggression and anger.
Ceres	⚳	Ceres	Δημήτηρ (Demeter)	𒀭𒊩𒌆𒂟 (Nisaba)	Անահիտ (Anahit)	शक्ति (Shakti)	Isis; Renenutet	modern	Goddess of agriculture, fertility, and the seasons.	Divine Mother principle; nurturing, nourishment, and the sustaining power of nature.
Jupiter	♃	Jupiter; Jove	Δίας (Dias)	𒀭𒀫𒌓 (Marduk)	Փառազնոտ (Þaŕaznot)	गुरु (Guru) बृहस्पती (Brihaspati)	Amun	ancient	Leader, King and Father of the Olympian Gods; Jupiter means "Jovial King" and/or "Father of Thunder."	Mentor and teacher of gods. Always helped gods in war against demons. Guru means "teacher" or "priest." Brihaspati means "lord of prayer or devotion." Associated with luck and expansion.
Saturn	♄	Saturn	Κρόνος (Cronus) Ἥλιος (Helios)	𒀭𒊩𒌆𒅁 (Kajamanu)	Արտախույր (Artakhuyr)	शनि (Shani)	Horus-Horkapet	ancient	God of Agriculture and the Father of Jupiter. Leader and ruler of the Titans; Saturn means "God of Seeds", "Father of the Harvest", and/or "Father Time."	Shani Dev, Son of Surya (Sun);God of Karma and Justice;Gives consequences for a person's deeds during life. Associated with status, equitable punishment, wisdom, ambition, patience, honor, toughness, but with pessimism, hardships, and fatalism.
Uranus	♅	Caelus	Ουρανός (Ouranos)	𒀭𒀭 (Anu, Anshar)	Երկնակ (Yerknak)	अरुण (Aruna)	Horus	modern	God of the Sky, Father of Saturn and Grandfather of Jupiter; "Uranus" and "Caelus" both mean "Sky" and/or "Father Sky."	Charioteer of Sun and half-brother of mythological snake king Vasuki in the Puranas. Vasuki means "of divine being." Associated with originality, eccentricity, electricity, and sudden changes.
Neptune	♆	Neptune	Ποσειδῶν (Poseidon)	𒀭𒂗𒆠 (Enki)	Մոսմոռակ (Mosmoŕak)	वरुण (Varuna)	Khnum	modern	God of the Sea	God of rain in Indian mythology; Varuna means "God of the sea." Associated with dreams, illusions, and psychic receptivity, but sometimes with vagueness and uncertainty as well.
Pluto	⯓	Pluto	Πλούτων (Plouton); Ἅδης (Hades)	𒀭𒊩𒌆𒆠𒃲 (Ereshkigal)	Հեռակ (Heŕak)	यम (Yama)	Osiris	modern	God of the Underworld and Death; Hades means "the unseen" and Pluto means "wealth."	God of Death and Rebirth. Associated with subconscious forces, ruling all that is 'below the surface' (Abyss).
Eris	⯰	Discordia; Bellona	Ἔρις (Eris)	𒀭𒅗𒊏 (Erra) 𒀭𒉆𒋻 (Namtar) 𒀭𒀭𒅎 (Anzu)	Սպանդարամետ (Spandaramet)	काली (Kali)	Set	modern	Goddess of discord, rivalry, and conflict that exposes hidden tensions.	Force that breaks illusion and provokes transformation through crisis.

=== Daily motion ===
Planet	Average speed (geocentric)	Highest speed (geocentric)	Lowest speed (geocentric)
Sun	00°59'08"	01°03'00"	00°57'10"
Moon	13°10'35"	16°30'00"	11°45'36"
Mercury	01°23'00"	02°25'00"	−01°30'00"
Venus	01°12'00"	01°22'00"	−00°41'12"
Mars	00°31'27"	00°52'00"	−00°26'12"
Ceres	00°12'40"	00°30'00"	−00°16'00"
Jupiter	00°04'59"	00°15'40"	−00°08'50"
Saturn	00°02'01"	00°08'48"	−00°05'30"
Uranus	00°00'42"	00°04'00"	−00°02'40"
Neptune	00°00'24"	00°02'25"	−00°01'45"
Pluto	00°00'15"	00°02'30"	−00°01'48"
Pallas	00°12'20"	00°40'30"	−00°22'30"
Juno	00°14'15"	00°39'00"	−00°18'00"
Vesta	00°16'15"	00°36'00"	−00°17'32"
Chiron	00°02'00"	00°10'00"	−00°06'00"

== History ==
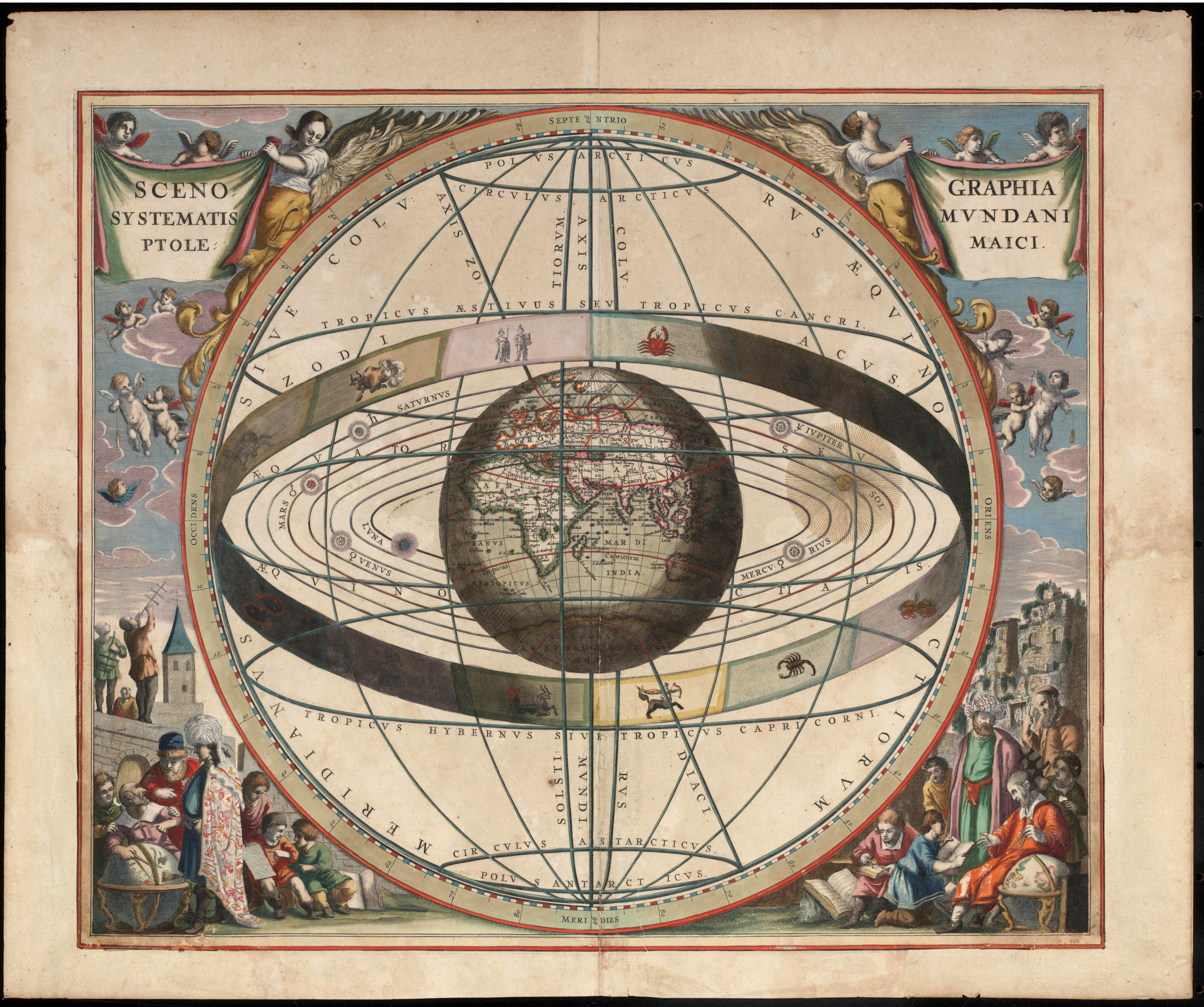
The geocentric Ptolemaic system of the universe depicted by Andreas Cellarius, 1660–1661

Treatises on the Ptolemaic planets and their influence on people born "under their reign" appear in block book form, so-called "planet books" or Planetenbücher. This genre is attested in numerous manuscripts beginning in the mid 15th century in the Alemannic German area; it remained popular throughout the German Renaissance, exerting great iconographical influence far into the 17th century.

These books usually list a male and a female Titan with each planet: Cronus and Rhea with Saturn, Eurymedon and Themis with Jupiter, probably Crius and Dione with Mars, Hyperion and Theia with the Sun, Atlas and Phoebe with the Moon, Coeus and Metis with Mercury, and Oceanus and Tethys with Venus. These planetary correspondences are linked to the ancient Greek myth of Eurynome as noted by Robert Graves.

The qualities inherited from the planets by their children are as follows:

Saturn
industrious, melancholic, and tranquil
Jupiter
charming and hunting
Mars
soldiering and warfare
Sun
music and athleticism
Moon
shy and tenderness
Mercury
prudent, crafty, lovable, and commerce
Venus
amorousness and passion.

== Classical planets ==
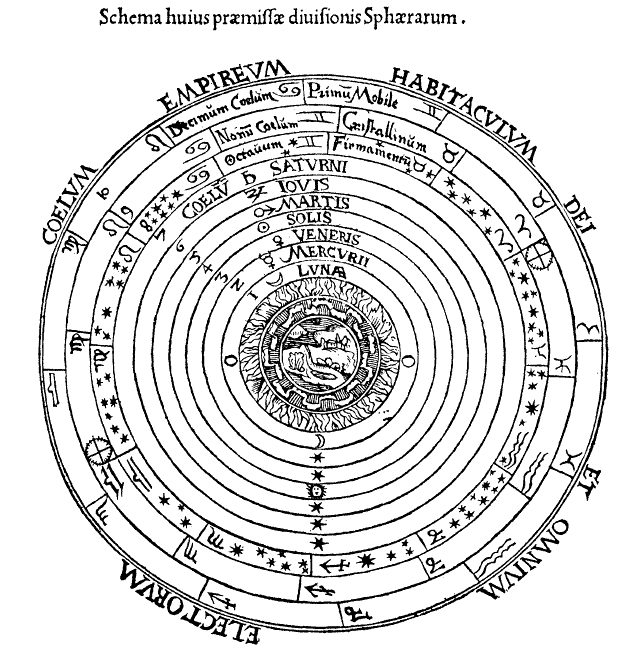
Diagram of the geocentric cosmology underpinning classical astrology (16th century)

The seven classical planets are those easily seen with the naked eye, and were thus known to ancient astrologers. They are the Moon, Mercury, Venus, Sun, Mars, Jupiter, and Saturn. Sometimes, the Sun and Moon were referred to as "the lights" or the "luminaries". Vesta and Uranus can also just be seen with the naked eye, though no ancient culture appears to have taken note of them. The classical planets fit neatly into the theories of Aristotle and Ptolemy, with each being part of a Celestial sphere. The order of the classical planets is determined by the speed. The Moon moves the fastest and so is considered to form the first celestial sphere above Earth. Everything below the Moon is part of the sublunary sphere. Mercury moves the second fastest and so rules the next highest sphere. Next is Venus, which takes about 260 days to revolve around the Sun. Following that is the Sun, then Mars, Jupiter and Saturn.

The astrological descriptions attached to the seven classical planets have been preserved since ancient times. Astrologers call the seven classical planets "the seven personal and social planets", because they are said to represent the basic human drives of every individual. The personal planets are the Sun, Moon, Mercury, Venus and Mars. The social or transpersonal planets are Jupiter and Saturn. Jupiter and Saturn are often called the first of the "transpersonal" or "transcendent" planets as they represent a transition from the inner personal planets to the outer modern, impersonal planets. The following is a list of the planets and their associated characteristics.

=== Moon ===
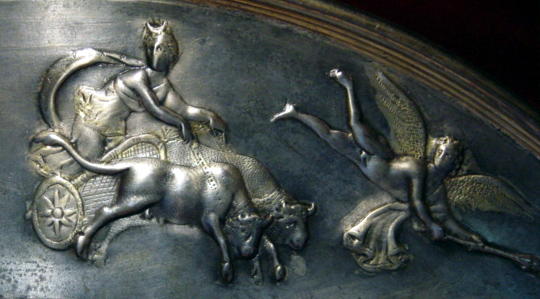
Luna or Diana, wearing a crescent-moon crown and driving her ox-drawn chariot (biga), on the Parabiago plate (2nd–5th centuries AD)

The Moon is the ruling planet of Cancer♋️ and is exalted in Taurus ♉️. In classical Roman mythology, the Moon was Luna, at times identified with Diana (Artemis and Selene in Greek Mythology). The Moon is large enough for its gravity to affect the Earth, stabilizing its orbit and producing the regular ebb and flow of the tides. The lunar day syncs up with its orbit around Earth in such a manner that the same side of the Moon always faces the Earth and the other side, known as the "far side of the Moon" faces toward space.

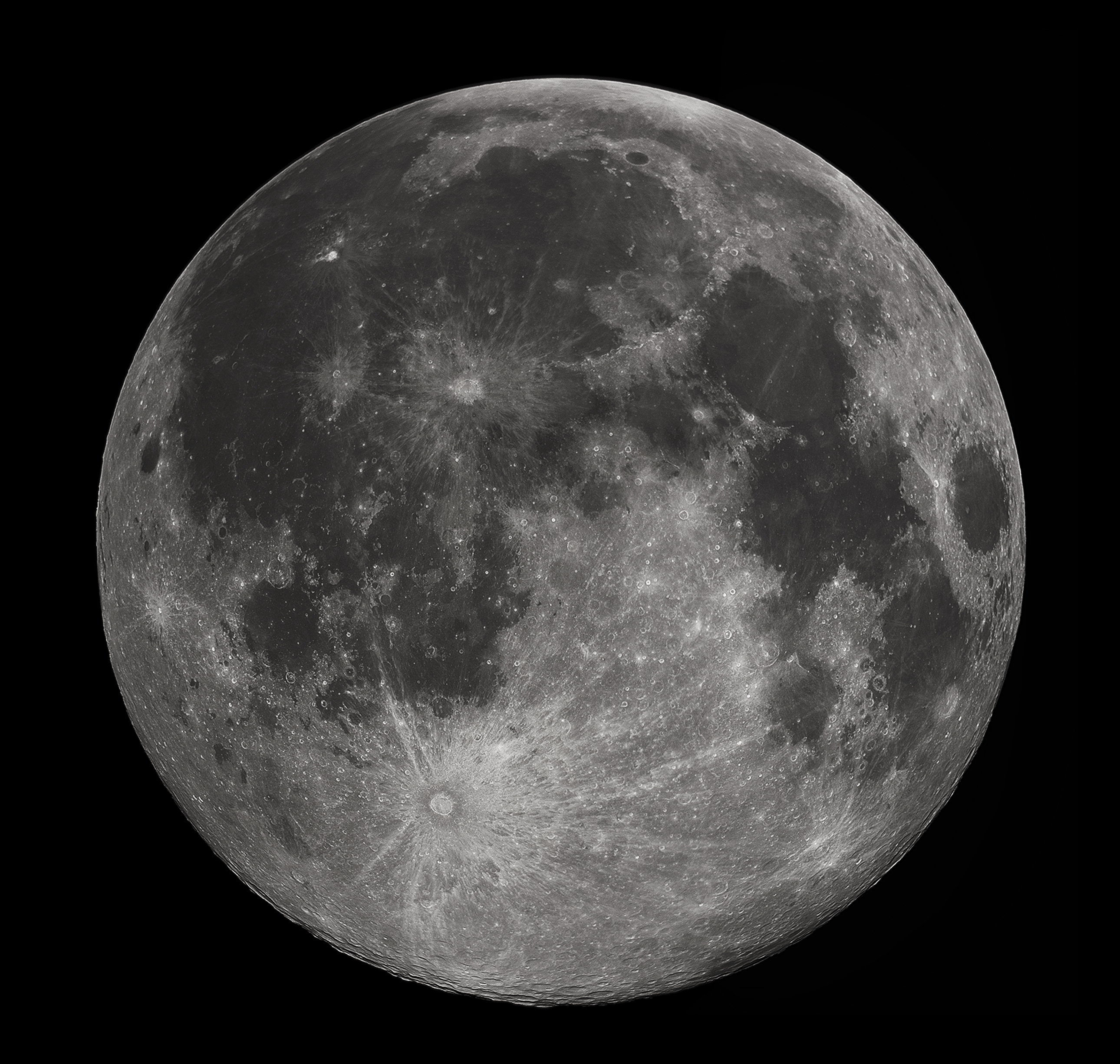
The full Moon

In astrology, the Moon is associated with a person's intuition, emotions, unconscious habits, rhythms, memories, moods, instincts and their ability to react and adapt to those around them. It is associated for some with the mother or the urge to nurture, the home, the need for security and the past, especially early experiences and childhood. The 1st-century poet Manilius described the Moon, or Luna, as melancholic. In medicine, the Moon is associated with the digestive system, stomach, breasts, the ovaries and menstruation (which occurs on a monthly cycle) and the pancreas. Despite Manilius's assignment, the Moon is more commonly associated with the phlegmatic humor; it ruled the animal spirits. In modern astrology, the Moon is the primary native ruler of the fourth house, but traditionally it had its joy in the third house.

The Moon or Luna is associated with Monday, the word Monday comes from the Old English word for Moon day or Moon's day, and in Romance languages, the name for Monday comes from luna (e.g., luni in Romanian, lundi in French, lunes in Spanish and lunedi in Italian). Dante Alighieri associated the Moon with the liberal art of grammar.

In Chinese astrology, the Moon represents Yin, the passive and receptive feminine life principle. In Indian astrology, the Moon is called Chandra or Soma and represents the mind, queenship and mother.

=== Mercury ===
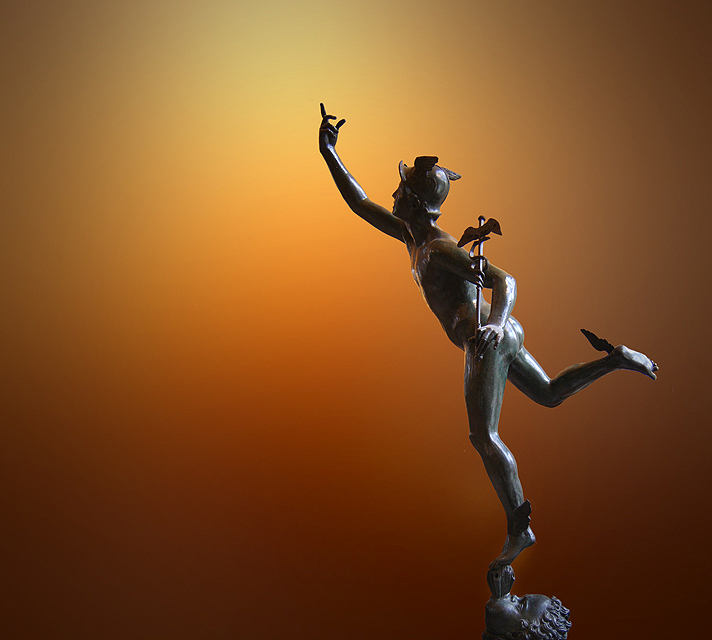
Flying Mercury (late 16th-century) by Giambologna

Mercury is the ruling planet of Gemini ♊️ and Virgo ♍️ and is exalted in Virgo ♍️. In classical Roman mythology, Mercury is the messenger of the gods, noted for his speed and swiftness.

In astrology, Mercury represents the principles of communication, mentality, thinking patterns, rationality/reasoning, adaptability and variability. Mercury governs schooling and education, the immediate environment of neighbors, siblings and cousins, transport over short distances, messages and forms of communication such as post, email and telephone, newspapers, journalism and writing, information gathering skills and physical dexterity. The 1st-century poet Marcus Manilius described Mercury as an inconstant, vivacious and curious planet.

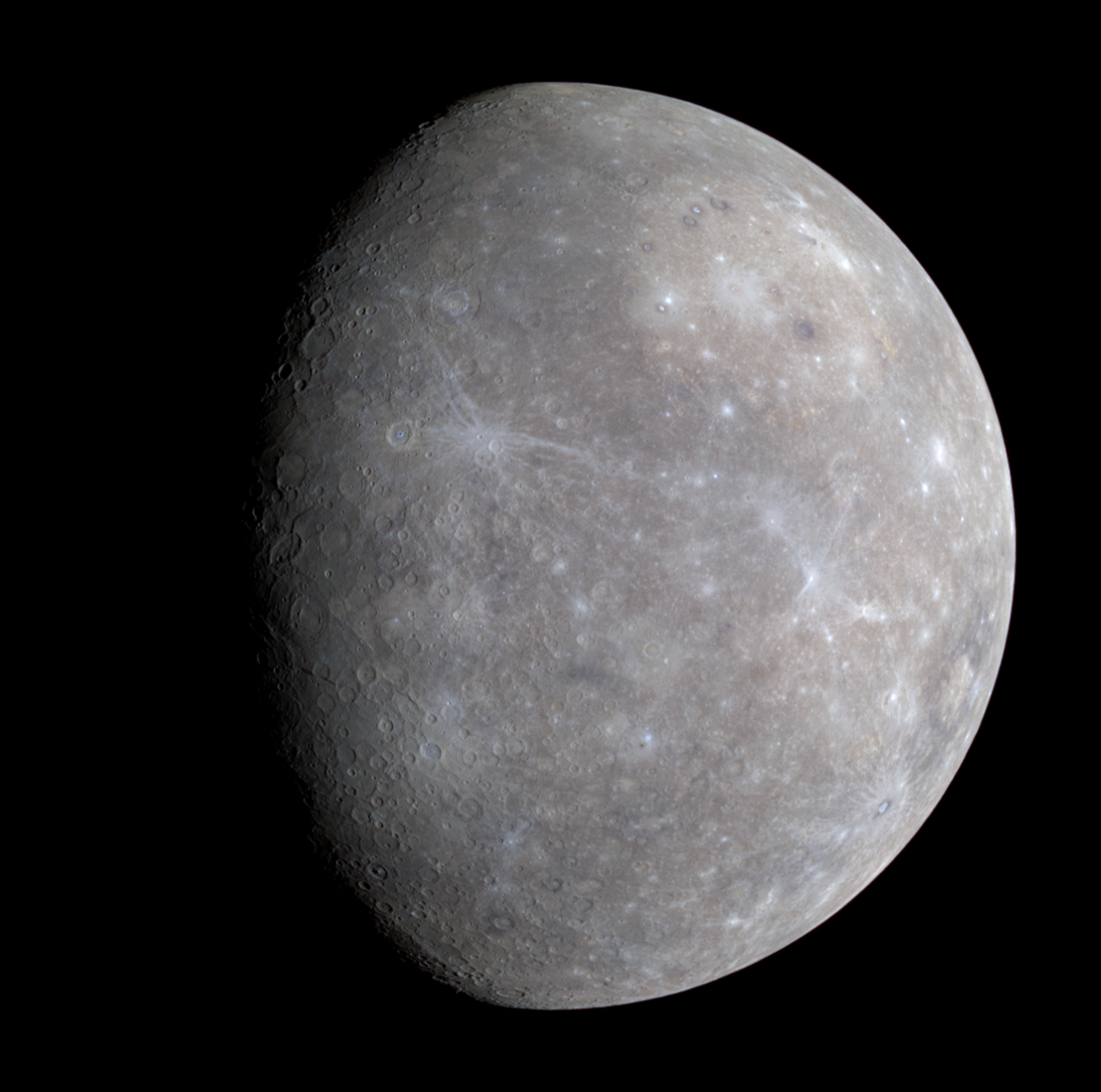
The planet Mercury

In medicine, Mercury is associated with the nervous system, the brain, the respiratory system, the thyroid and the sense organs. It is traditionally held to be essentially cold and dry, according to its placement in the zodiac and in any aspects to other planets.

In modern astrology, Mercury is regarded as the ruler of the third house; traditionally, it had the joy in the first house. Mercury is the messenger of the gods in mythology. It is the planet of day-to-day expression and relationships. Mercury's action is to take things apart and put them back together again. It is an opportunistic planet, decidedly unemotional and curious.

In Chinese astrology, Mercury represents water, the fourth element.

=== Venus ===
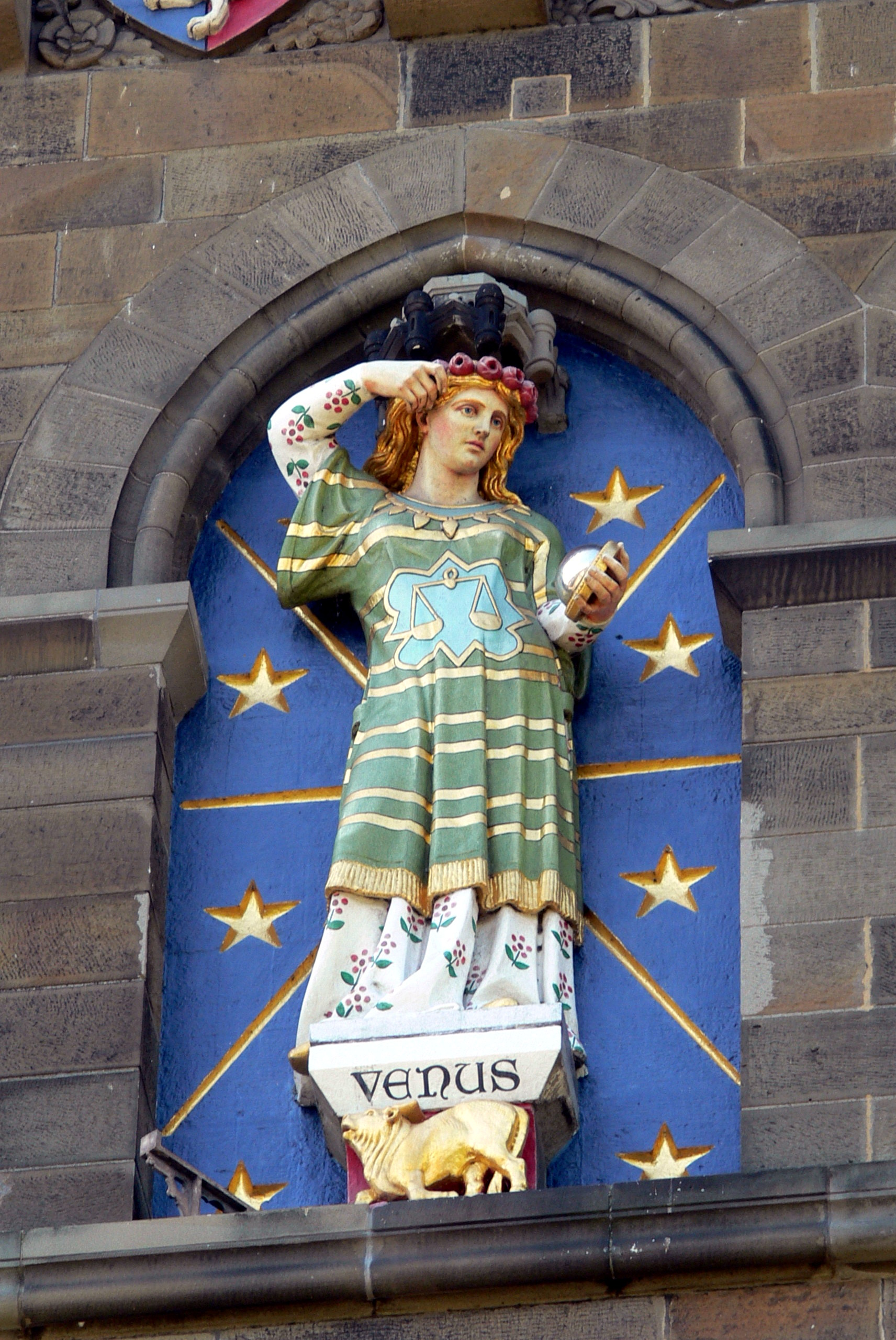
Venus, wearing the sign of Libra on her midsection, and Taurus at her feet, at Cardiff Castle, Wales

Venus is the ruling planet of Libra ♎️ and Taurus ♉️ and is exalted in Pisces ♓️. In classical Roman mythology, Venus is the goddess of love and beauty, famous for the passions she could stir among the gods. Her cults may represent the religiously legitimate charm and seduction of the divine by mortals, in contrast to the formal, contractual relations between most members of Rome's official pantheon and the state, and the unofficial, illicit manipulation of divine forces through magic.

Venus orbits the Sun in 225 days, spending about 18.75 days in each sign of the zodiac. Venus is the second-brightest object in the night sky, the Moon being the brightest. It is usually beheld as a twin planet to Earth.

In astrology, Venus is associated with the principles of harmony, femininity, the female principle and beginning, the maiden and the female body, beauty, refinement, affections, love, and the urge to sympathize and unite with others. It is involved with the desire for pleasure, comfort and ease. It governs romantic relations, sex (the origin of the words 'venery' and 'venereal'), marriage and business partnerships, the arts and fashion. The 1st-century poet Marcus Manilius described Venus as generous and fecund and the lesser benefic.

The planet Venus

The planet Venus in medicine is associated with the reproductive system, lumbar region, the veins, parathyroids, throat and kidneys. Venus was thought to be moderately warm and moist and associated with the phlegmatic humor.

Venus rules over Friday and is the ruler of second house. In languages deriving from Latin, such as Romanian, Spanish, French, and Italian, the word for Friday often resembles the word Venus (vineri, viernes, vendredi and venerdì respectively). Dante Alighieri associated Venus with the liberal art of rhetoric.

=== Sun ===
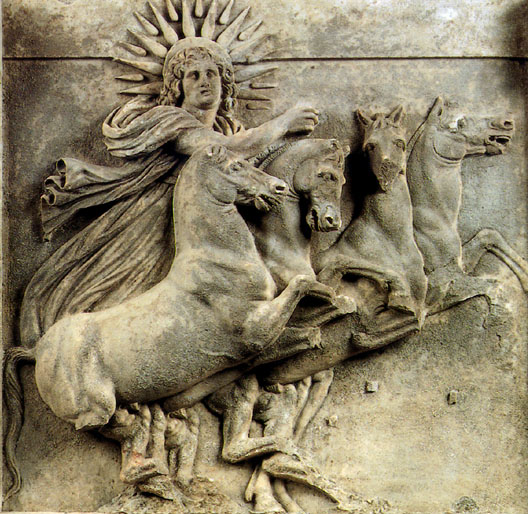
Helios on a relief from Ilion (Troy), early 4th century BC

The Sun is the ruling planet of Leo ♌️ and is exalted in Aries ♈️. In classical Greek mythology, the Sun was represented by the Titans Hyperion and Helios (Roman Sol, and later by Apollo or Helios, the god of light). The Sun is the star at the center of the Solar System, around which the Earth and other planets revolve and provides us with heat and light. The arc that the Sun travels in every year, rising and setting in a slightly different place each day, is therefore in reality a reflection of the Earth's own orbit around the Sun. This arc is larger the farther north or south from the equator latitude, giving a more extreme difference between day and night and between seasons during the year. The Sun travels through the twelve signs of the zodiac on its annual journey, spending about a month in each. The Sun's position on a person's birthday therefore determines what is usually called their "sun" sign. However, the sun sign allotment varies between Western (sign change around 22-23 of every month) and Hindu astrology (sign change around 14-15 of every month) due to the different systems of planetary calculations, following the tropical and sidereal definitions respectively.

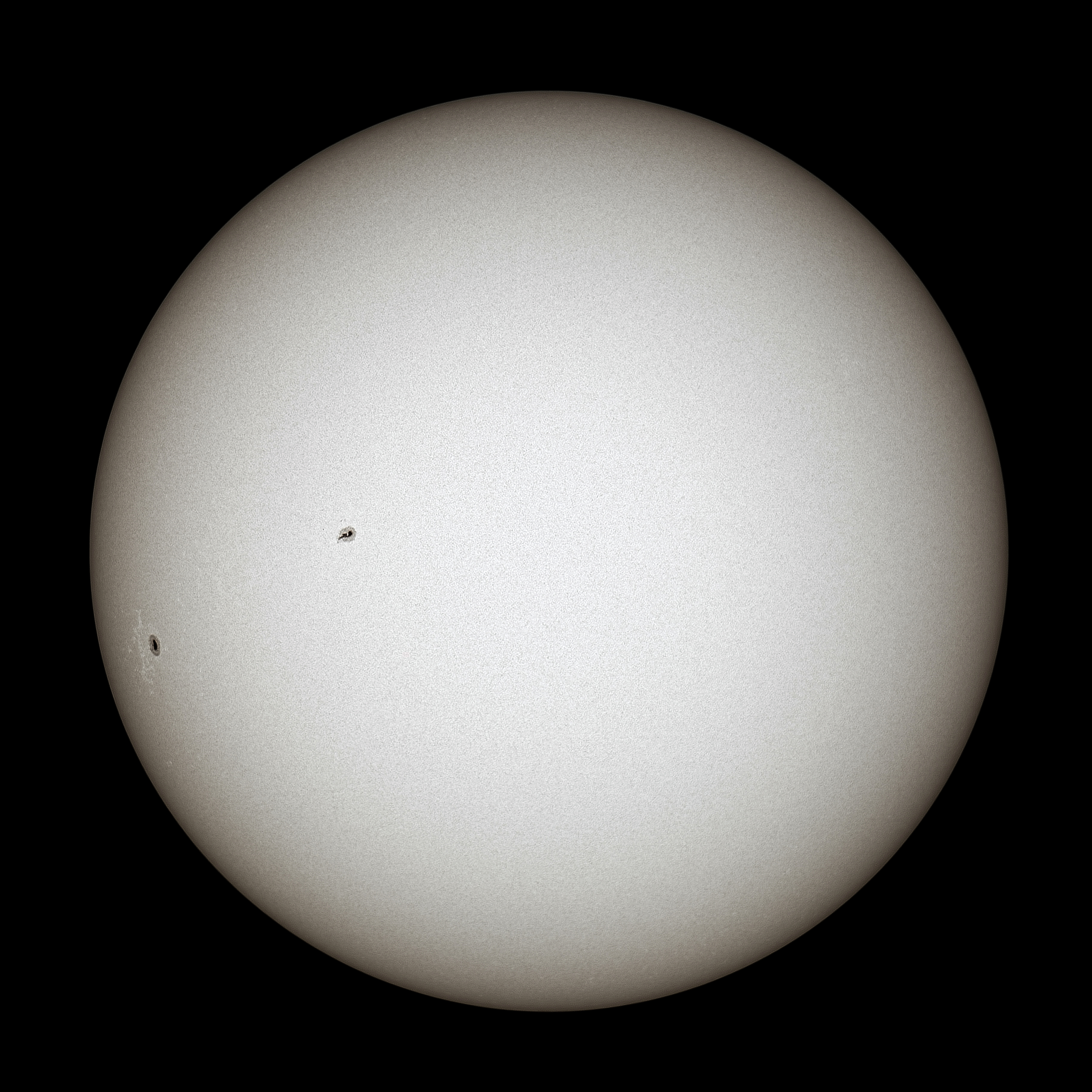
The Sun, the star at the center of the Solar System

In astrology, the Sun is usually thought to represent the conscious ego, the self and its expression, personal power, pride and authority, leadership qualities and the principles of creativity, spontaneity, health and vitality, the sum of which is named the "life force". One of the first recorded references to Sun worship is from the Mesopotamian Religion and described in the Epic of Gilgamesh. The 1st-century poet Marcus Manilius in his epic, 8000-verse poem, Astronomica, described the Sun, or Sol, as benign and favorable. In medicine, the Sun is associated with the heart, circulatory system, and the thymus. Additionally, humans depend on the sun to produce and obtain vitamin D; an important supplement aiding the body's immune system and bone health. In Ayurveda, it rules over life-force (praan-shakti), governs bile temperament (pitta), stomach, bones and eyes. In modern astrology, the Sun is the primary native ruler of the fifth house, but traditionally it had its joy in the ninth house.

The Sun sign is composed of 30 degrees (0-29), which make up the circle.

The Sun rules over Sunday. Dante Alighieri associated the Sun with the liberal art of music. In Chinese astrology, the Sun represents Yang, the active, assertive masculine life principle.

=== Mars ===
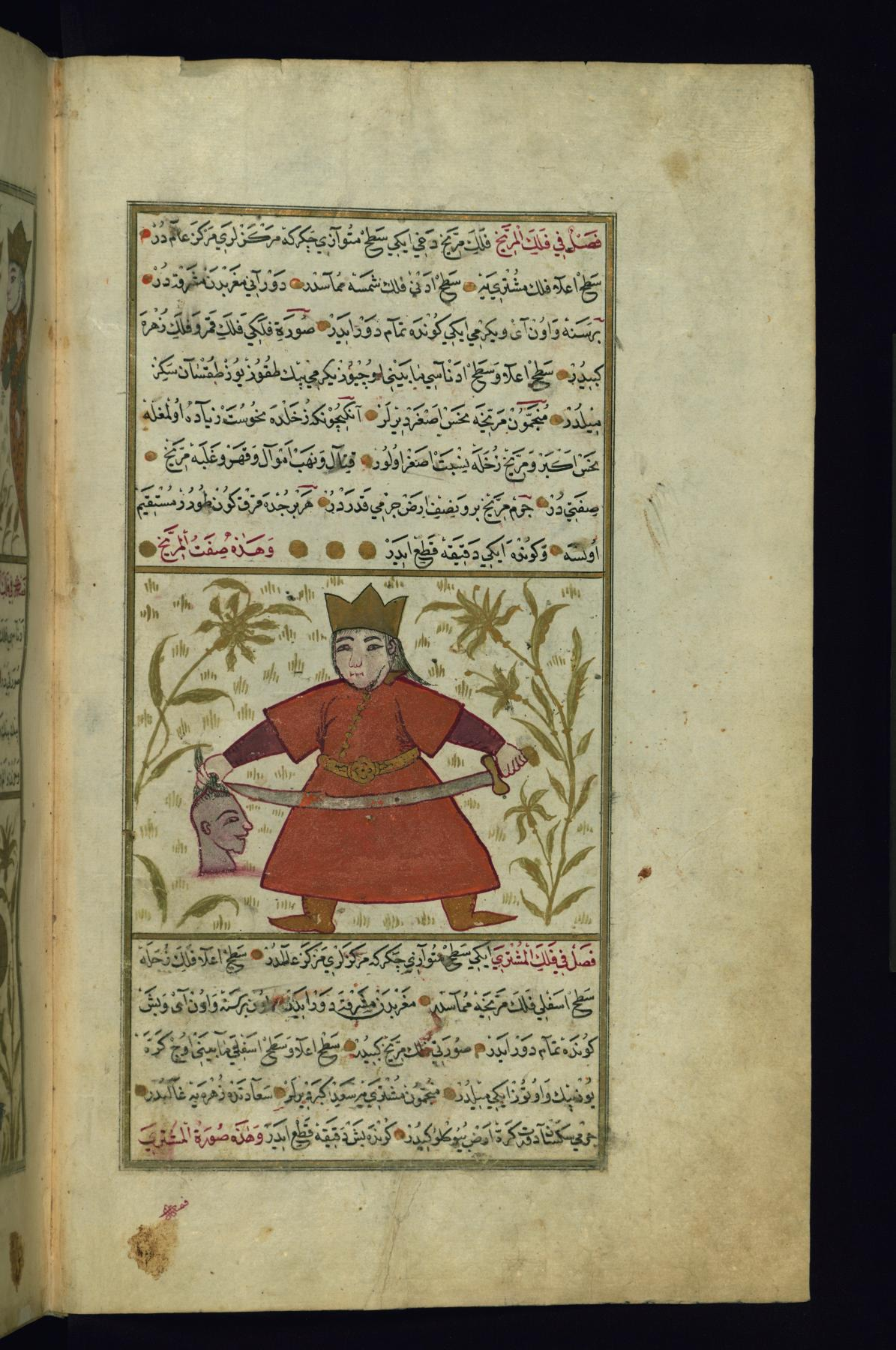
Early 18th-century illustration of Mars (al-mirrikh) for the Bestiary of Zakariya al-Qazwini (Walters Art Museum)

Mars is the ruling planet of Aries ♈️, the traditional ruling planet of Scorpio ♏️, and is exalted in Capricorn ♑️. Mars is the Roman god of war and bloodshed, whose symbol is a spear and shield. Both the soil of Mars and the hemoglobin of human blood are rich in iron and because of this they share its distinct deep red color. He was second in importance only to Jupiter and Saturn, due to Mars being the most prominent of the military gods worshipped by the Roman legions.

Mars orbits the Sun in 687 days, spending about 57.25 days in each sign of the zodiac. It is also the first planet that orbits outside of Earth's orbit, making it the first planet that does not set along with the Sun. Mars has two permanent polar ice caps. During a pole's winter, it lies in continuous darkness, chilling the surface and causing the deposition of 25–30% of the atmosphere into slabs of CO_{2} ice (dry ice).

In astrology, Mars is associated with aggression, confrontation, masculinity, the male body, the warrior, the man, courage, energy, strength, ambition and impulsiveness. Mars governs sports, competitions and physical activities in general. The 1st-century poet Manilius, described the planet as ardent and as the lesser malefic. In medicine, Mars presides over the genitals, head, the muscular system, the gonads and adrenal glands. It was traditionally held to be hot and excessively dry and rules the choleric humor. It was associated with fever, accidents, trauma, pain and surgery.

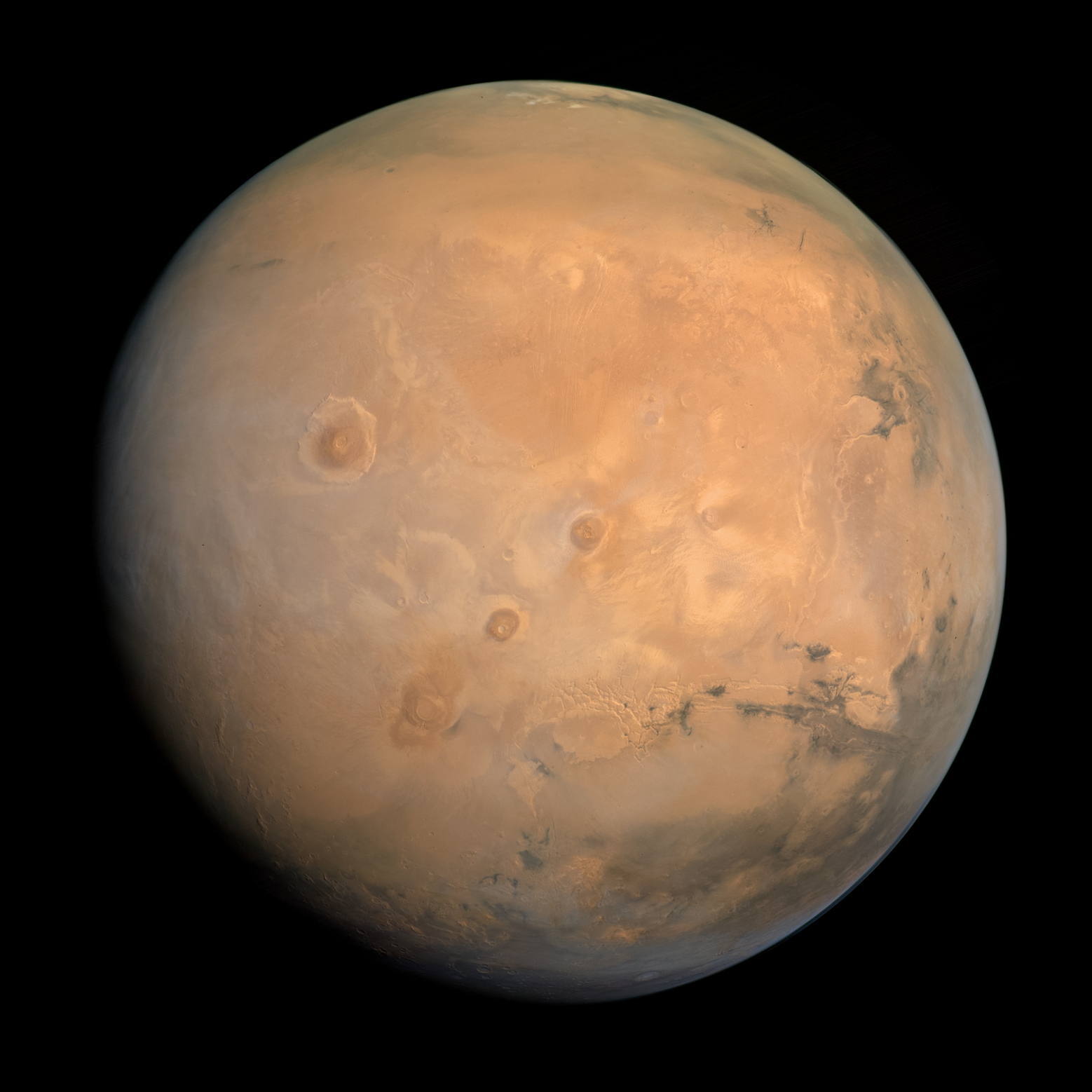
The planet Mars

In modern astrology, Mars is the primary native ruler of the first house. Traditionally however, Mars ruled both the third and tenth houses, and had its joy in the sixth house. While Venus tends to the overall relationship atmosphere, Mars is the passionate impulse and action, the masculine aspect, discipline, willpower and stamina.

Mars rules over Tuesday and in Romance languages the word for Tuesday often resembles Mars (in Romanian, marți, in Spanish, martes, in French, mardi, and in Italian, martedì). The English "Tuesday" is a modernised form of "Tîw's Day", Tîw being the Old English analogue to Mars (and to Tyr of Norse mythology). Dante Alighieri associated Mars with the liberal art of arithmetic. In Chinese astrology, Mars is ruled by the element fire, which is passionate, energetic and adventurous.

Hindu astrology includes Mars (Mangala) in the concept of Nakshatra, Navagraha, and Saptarishi.

=== Jupiter ===
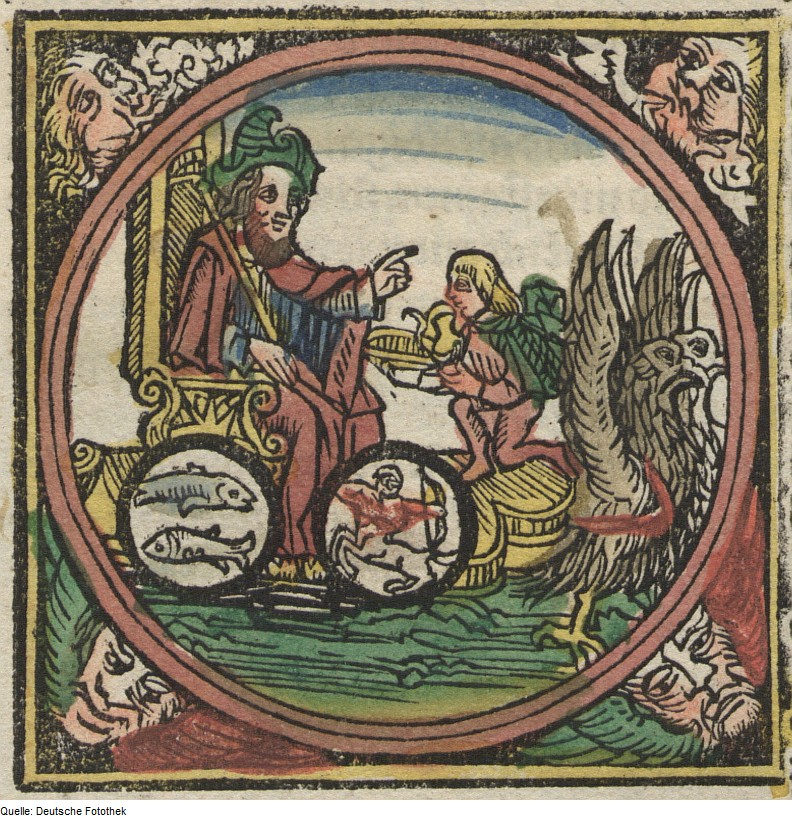
Jupiter enthroned, with the symbols of Pisces and Sagittarius at his feet (woodcut by Johannes Regiomontanus, 1512)

Jupiter is the traditional ruling planet of Sagittarius ♐️ and Pisces ♓️. It is exalted in Cancer ♋️. In classical Roman mythology, Jupiter is the sky god, ruler of the gods, and their guardian and protector; his symbol is the thunderbolt. The Romans believed that Jupiter granted them supremacy because they had honored him more than any other people had. Jupiter was "the fount of the auspices upon which the relationship of the city with the gods rested." He personified the divine authority of Rome's highest offices, internal organization, and external relations. His image in the Republican and Imperial Capitol bore regalia associated with Rome's ancient kings and the highest consular and Imperial honours.

In the same way, the planet Jupiter is the king of the other planets, a giant in size with spectacular, brightly colored clouds and intense storms. It plays an important protecting role in using its massive gravity to capture or expel from the solar system many comets and asteroids that would otherwise threaten Earth and the inner planets. Jupiter takes 11.9 years to orbit the Sun, spending almost an earth year (361 days) in each sign of the zodiac. Furthermore, Jupiter is usually the fourth-brightest object in the sky (after the Sun, the Moon and Venus). Sagittarius is home to colossal red supergiants such as KW Sagittarii, VX Sagittarii, and GCIRS 7, all of which are roughly the size of Jupiter's orbit.

In astrology, Jupiter is associated with the principles of growth, expansion, adventures, healing, prosperity, good fortune, and miracles. Jupiter governs long distance and foreign travel, big business and wealth, higher education, religion, and the law. It is also associated with the urge for freedom and exploration, as well with gambling and merrymaking.

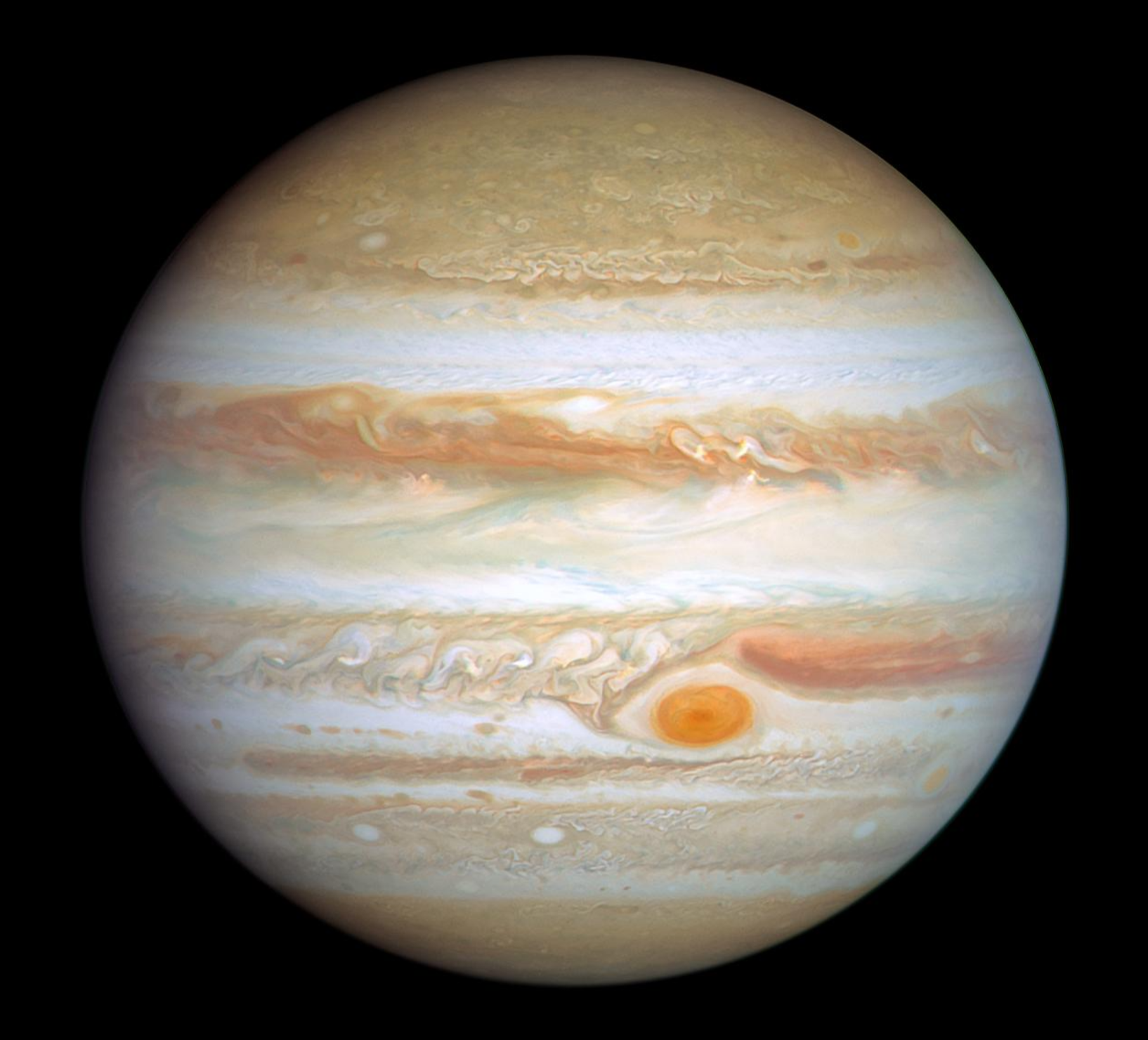
The planet Jupiter

The 1st-century poet Manilius described Jupiter as temperate and benign, and the greater benefic. It was regarded as warm and moist in nature, and therefore favorable to life. In medicine, Jupiter is associated with the liver, pituitary gland, and the disposition of fats; it governs the sanguine humor. In modern astrology, Jupiter is the primary native ruler of the ninth house, but traditionally, Jupiter was assigned to both the second and ninth houses: the house of values and the house of beliefs, respectively, and had its joy in the second house of good luck.

Jupiter rules over Thursday, and in Romance languages, the name for Thursday often comes from Jupiter (e.g., joi in Romanian, jeudi in French, jueves in Spanish, and giovedì in Italian). Dante Alighieri associated Jupiter with the liberal art of geometry. In Chinese astrology, Jupiter is ruled by the element wood, which is patient, hard-working, and reliable. In Indian astrology, Jupiter is known as Guru or Brihaspati and is known as the 'great teacher'.

=== Saturn ===
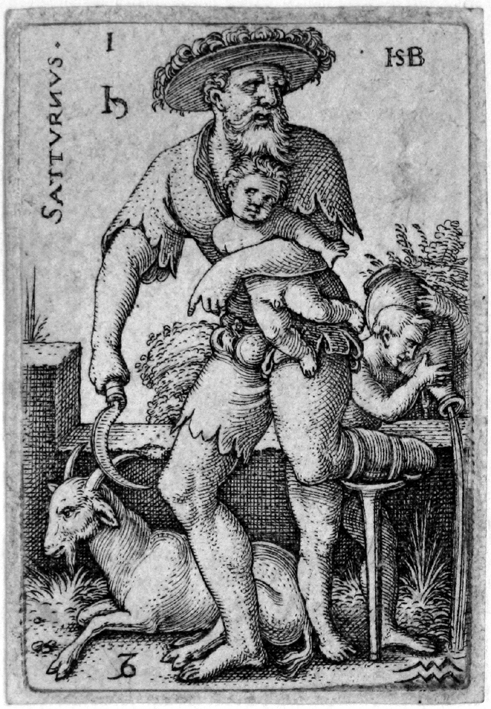
Saturn, with Capricorn and Aquarius at his feet and the New Year personified as an infant in his arms, from The Seven Planets with the Signs of the Zodiac (1539) by Hans Sebald Beham

Saturn is the traditional ruling planet of Capricorn ♑️ and Aquarius ♒️ and is exalted in Libra ♎️. In classical Roman mythology, Saturn is the god of seeds, crops, husbandry, and the harvest (agriculture), leader of the titans, father and founder of civilizations, social order, and conformity. The glyph is shaped like a scythe, but it is known as the "crescent below the cross", whereas Jupiter's glyph is the "crescent above the cross". Famous rings of the planet Saturn that enclose and surround it, reflect the idea of human limits. Saturn takes 29.5 years to orbit the Sun, spending about 2.46 years in each sign of the zodiac. During ancient Roman society, the Romans worshipped Saturn as the highest ranking and most important god among their pantheon of deities, sharing that same prestige with Jupiter.

In astrology, Saturn is associated with focus, precision, nobility, ethics, the father, civility, lofty goals, career, great achievements, dedication, authority figures, stability, virtues, productiveness, valuable hard lessons learned, destiny, structures, protective roles, balance, meritocracy, conservatism, and karma (reaping what you have sown or cosmic justice) but with limitations, restrictions, boundaries, anxiety, tests, practicality, reality, and time. It concerns a person's sense of duty, commitment, responsibility, including their physical and emotional endurance in times of hardships. Saturn is fundamentally economical. It also represents concern with long-term planning or foresight. The Return of Saturn is said to mark significant events in each person's life. According to the 1st-century poet Manilius, Saturn is sad, morose, and cold, and is the greater malefic. Claudius Ptolemy states that "Saturn is lord of the right ear, the spleen, the bladder, the phlegm, and the bones." Saturn symbolized processes and things that were dry and cold, which are necessary balancing aspects to maintain life. It governs the melancholic humor.

According to Sefer Yetzirah – GRA Version – Kaplan 4:13

"He made the letter Resh king over Peace
And He bound a crown to it
And He combined one with another
And with them He formed
Saturn in the Universe
Friday in the Year
The left nostril in the Soul,
male and female."

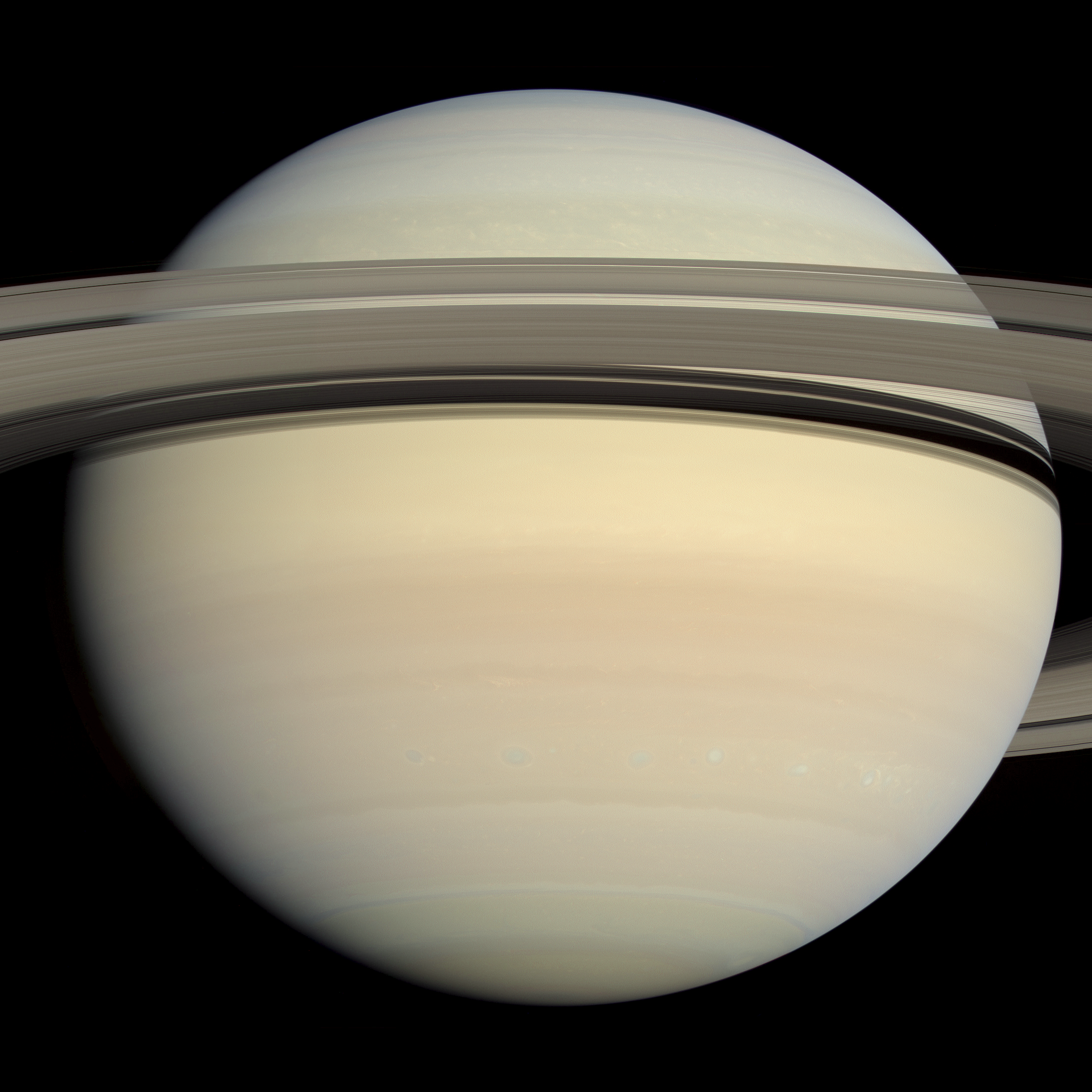
The planet Saturn

Western astrology appraises Saturn as the primary native ruler of the tenth house. In traditional Hindu astrology however, Saturn ruled both the first and eighth houses, and had its joy in the twelfth house of mischief and bad luck.

Saturn rules over Saturday, which was named after the deity Saturn. Dante Alighieri associated Saturn with the liberal art of astronomia (astronomy and astrology).

In Chinese astrology, Saturn is ruled by the element earth. In Indian astrology, Saturn is called Shani or "Sani", representing a noteworthy career and longevity. He is also the bringer of obstacles and hardship.

== Major planets discovered in the modern era ==
Since the invention of the telescope, Western astrology has incorporated Uranus, Neptune, Pluto (also referred to as "outer planets") into its methodology. The outer modern planets Uranus, Neptune and Pluto are often called the collective or transcendental planets. Indian and Chinese astrologers have tended to retain the ancient seven-planet system. Meanings have had to be assigned to them by modern astrologers, usually according to the major events that occurred in the world at the time of their discovery. As these astrologers are usually Western, the social and historical events they describe have an inevitable Western emphasis. Astrologers consider the "extra-Saturnian" planets to be "impersonal" or generational planets, meaning their effects are felt more across whole generations of society. Their effects in individuals depend upon how strongly they feature in that individual's birth-chart. The following are their characteristics as accepted by most astrologers, although some details can differ between astrologers.

A frequent critique of astrology is that while some astrologers believe the positions of all existent planets in the Solar System should be taken into account, astrologers were not able to correctly predict the existence of Uranus and Neptune using horoscopes. The grafting of Uranus, Neptune, and Pluto into the astrology discourse was done on an ad hoc basis. Notice also that in 2006, the International Astronomical Union (IAU) formally redefined the term planet to exclude dwarf planets such as Pluto.

=== Ceres ===
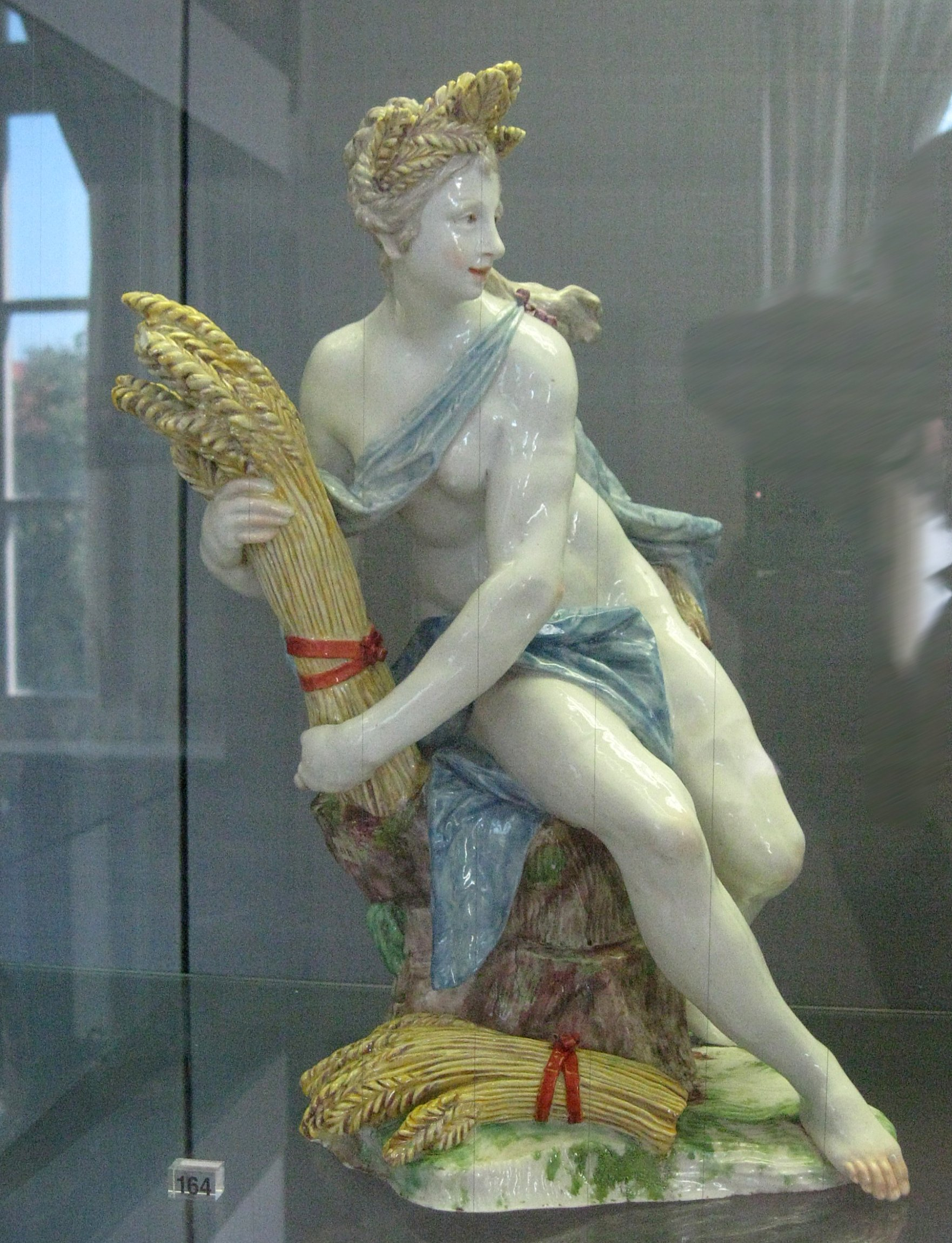
Ceres with cereals, a late 18th century work by Dominik Auliczek of the Nymphenburg Porcelain Manufactory

Ceres is a dwarf planet located in the asteroid belt between Mars and Jupiter and was the first massive modern body to be discovered, in 1801 by Giuseppe Piazzi. In Roman mythology, Ceres is the goddess of agriculture, grain crops, fertility, and maternal relationships, corresponding to the Greek goddess Demeter.

In astrology, Ceres has gained increasing prominence in modern interpretations. While early astrological practice largely ignored minor planets, Ceres has come to be associated with themes of nurturing, sustenance, food, agriculture, attachment, and the cyclical experience of loss and return. Its mythology (particularly the story of Ceres and her daughter Proserpina) has led astrologers to link it with separation, grief, renewal, and the negotiation between independence and caretaking.

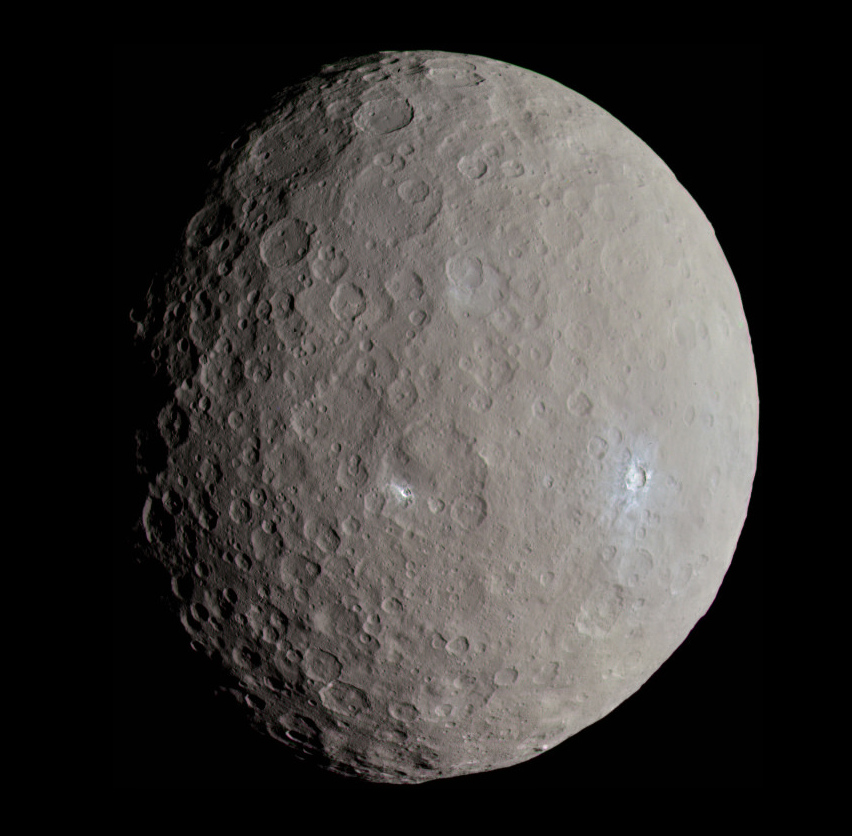
The dwarf planet Ceres

Some modern astrologers consider Ceres a ruler of Taurus ♉, by emphasizing embodiment, physical care, and practical support. Ceres acts as the higher octave of the Moon and its also associated with Monday. With Ceresbeing the emotional security transmutes to a sustanence of nurturing our spiritual security and sense of place on planet Earth. In this view, this planet reflects the instinct to nourish, organize, and maintain life through tangible, material means. Ceres is considered exalted in Gemini ♊️.

Ceres is often interpreted as indicating how an individual gives and receives care, experiences nourishment (both physical and emotional), and establishes boundaries in caregiving relationships. In medical astrology, it has been associated with nutrition, eating patterns, and issues related to bodily regulation and reproductive cycles.

Due to its relatively recent integration into astrological systems, Ceres is not universally used in traditional practice. However, it remains significant in many contemporary and psychological approaches to astrology.

=== Uranus ===
Uranus is the modern ruling planet of Aquarius ♒️ and is exalted in Scorpio ♏️. In classical Greek mythology, Uranus is the personification of the sky. The planet Uranus is unusual among the planets in that it rotates on its side so that it presents each of its poles to the Sun in turn during its orbit; causing both hemispheres to alternate between being bathed in light and lying in total darkness over the course of the orbit.

Uranus takes 84 years to orbit the Sun, spending about seven years in each sign of the zodiac. Uranus was discovered to be a planet only in 1781 by Sir William Herschel.

Astrological interpretations associate Uranus with the principles of ingenuity, evolutions, progress, unconventional ideas, individuality, discoveries, electricity, inventions, democracy, and revolutions. Uranus, among all planets, most governs genius.

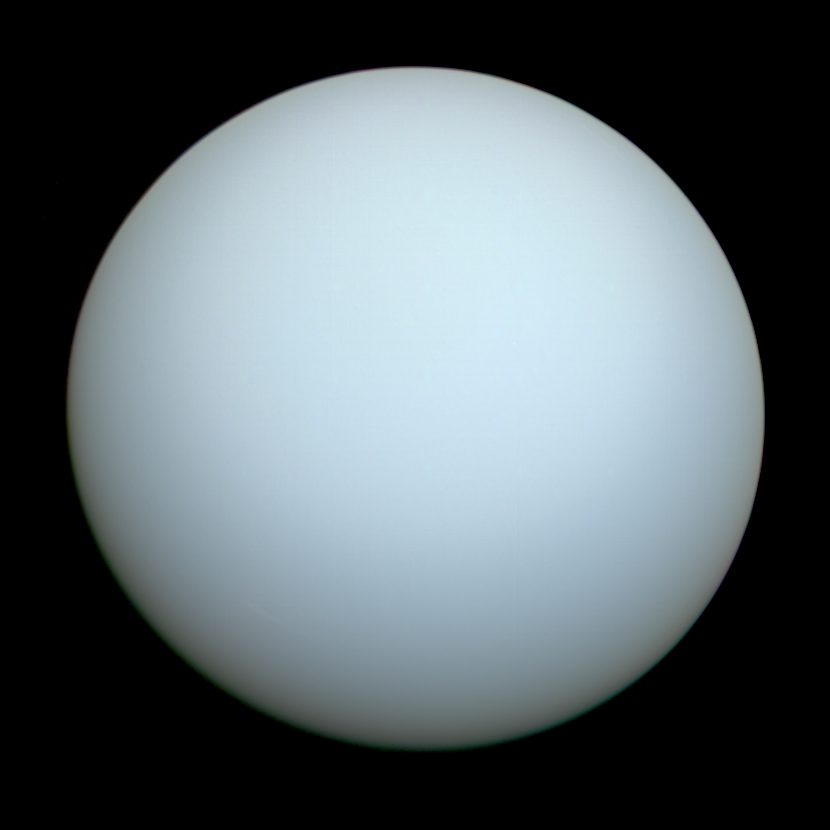
The planet Uranus

Uranus governs societies, clubs, and any group based on humanitarian or progressive ideals. Uranus, the planet of sudden and unexpected changes, rules freedom and originality. In society, it rules radical ideas and people, as well as revolutionary events that upset established structures. Uranus is also associated with Wednesday and Saturday, alongside Mercury and Saturn (since Uranus is in the higher octave of Mercury and Saturn).

In art and literature, the discovery of Uranus coincided with the Romantic movement, which emphasized individuality and freedom of creative expression. Additionally, it is often linked to an individual's animal spirit. When it comes to medicine, Uranus is believed to be particularly associated with the sympathetic nervous system, mental disorders, breakdowns and hysteria, spasms, and cramps. Uranus is considered by modern astrologers to be the primary native ruler of the eleventh house.

Jupiter, Neptune, and Pluto, ceiling mural (ca. 1597) created by Caravaggio for a room adjacent to the alchemical distillery of Cardinal Francesco Maria Del Monte: hovering around a translucent globe that represents the world are Jupiter with his eagle, Neptune holding a bident, and Pluto with a horse and Cerberus

=== Neptune ===
Neptune is the modern ruling planet of Pisces ♓️ and is exalted in Aquarius ♒. In classical Roman mythology, Neptune is the god of the sea, and the deep, ocean blue color of the planet Neptune reflects this. Its glyph is taken directly from Neptune's trident, symbolizing the curve of spirit being pierced by the cross of matter. Neptune takes 165 years to orbit the Sun, spending approximately 14 years (13.75) in each sign of the zodiac. Neptune was discovered in 1846.

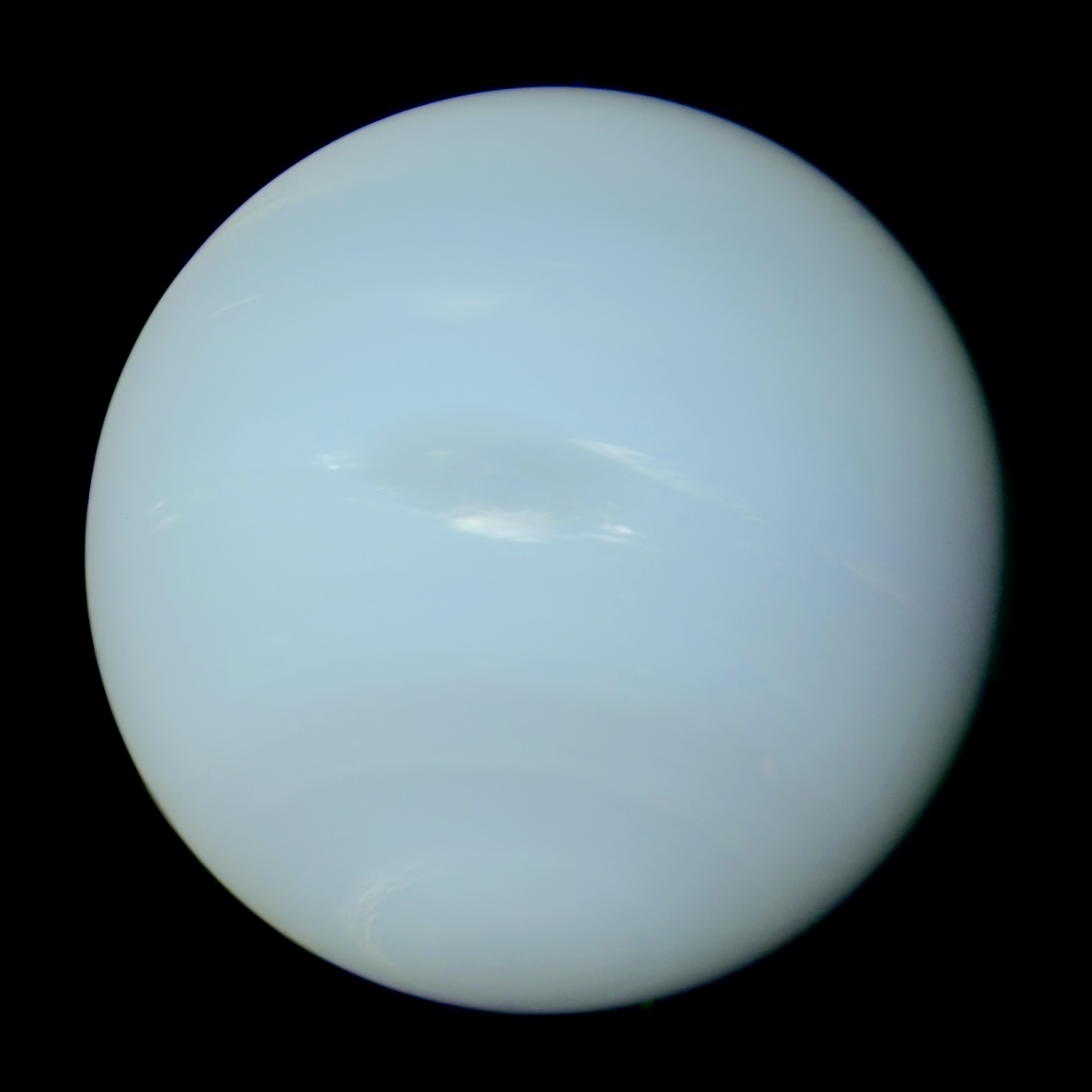
The planet Neptune

In astrology, Neptune is associated with the collective consciousness, the tenderness, the peace, the fantasies, idealism, dreams/fantasy, projections, undoing/dissolution of the status quo, artistry, empathy, sentimentality and illusion/confusion/vagueness on the way to discovering universal truths.

Like with Venus, the planet Neptune is also associated with Friday because Neptune is the higher octave of Venus. In art, the impressionist movement began a trend away from literal representation, to one based on the subtle, changing moods of light and color. In medicine, Neptune is seen to be particularly associated with the thalamus, the spinal canal, and uncertain illnesses or neuroses. Neptune is considered by modern astrologers to be the primary ruler of the twelfth house.

=== Pluto ===
Pluto is the modern ruling planet of Scorpio ♏️. It is exalted in Leo ♌. In classical Roman mythology, Pluto is the god of the underworld who is extremely wealthy. The alchemical symbol was given to Pluto on its discovery, three centuries after alchemical practices had all but disappeared. The alchemical symbol can therefore be read as spirit over mind, transcending matter.

Pluto takes 248 years to make a full circuit of the zodiac, but its progress is highly variable: it spends between 15 and 26 years in each sign.

In astrology, Pluto is called "the great renewer" and is considered to represent the part of a person that destroys in order to renew by bringing up buried intense needs and drives to the surface, and expressing them, even at the expense of the existing order. It is associated with absolutes, power, extremities, transformations, incredible feats, mass movements, and the need to cooperate or share with another if each is not to be destroyed. Pluto governs major business and enormous wealth, mining, surgery and detective work, and any enterprise that involves digging under the surface to bring the truth to light. Pluto is also associated with Tuesday, alongside Mars since Pluto is the higher octave of that planet in astrology.

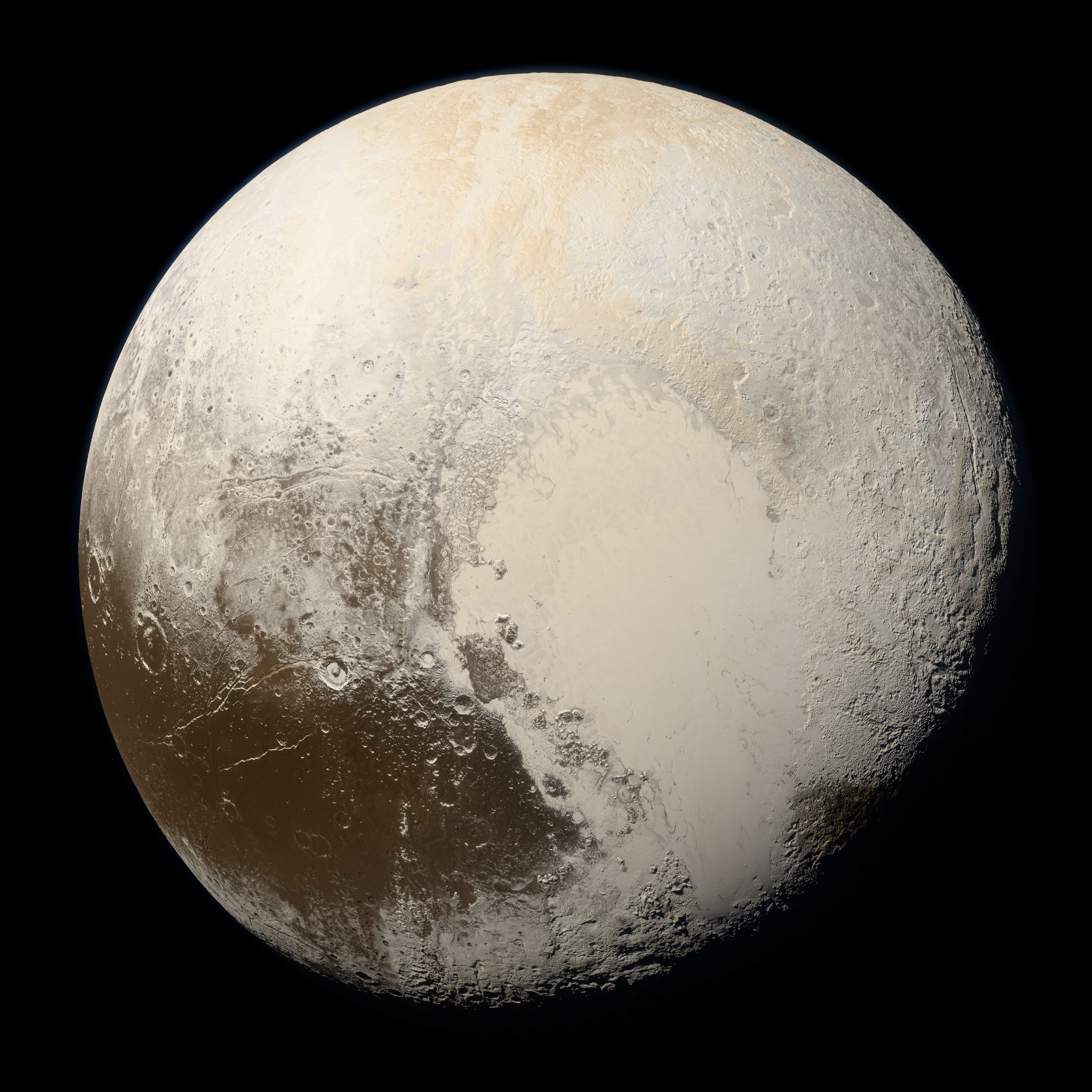
Pluto as captured by the New Horizons craft on 14 July 2015, in near true color.

Its entry in Cancer in 1914, the sign in which it was later discovered, coincided with World War I. It is also associated with nuclear armament due to such weapons using plutonium, which was named after the dwarf planet. Nuclear research had its genesis in the 1930s and 40s and later gave rise to the polarized nuclear standoff of the Cold War, with the mass consumer societies of the United States and other democracies facing the totalitarian state of the USSR. The discovery of Pluto also occurred just after the birth of modern psychoanalysis, when Freud and Jung began to explore the depths of the unconscious.

In real life events and culture, Pluto has been a major astrological aspect. Pluto is considered by modern astrologers to be the primary native ruler of the eighth house and a higher octave of Mars that functions on a collective level.

Astrologer Isabel M. Hickey also associated Pluto with the goddess Minerva, whom she claimed rules its highest aspect. Minerva is associated with universal consciousness and the light towards which life grows, while Pluto is associated with life in the dark.

=== Eris ===
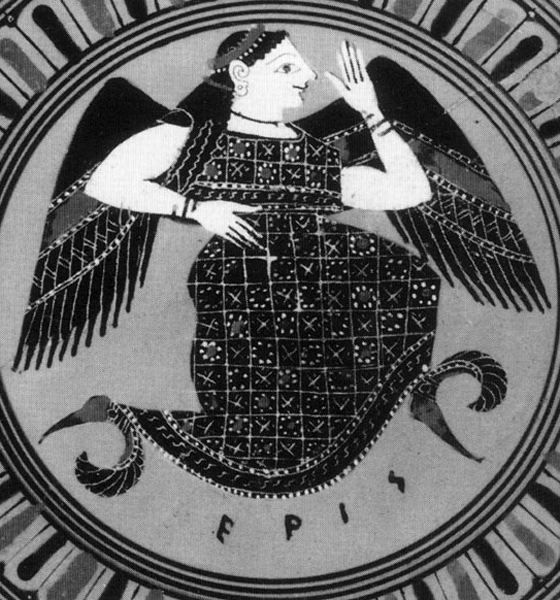
Winged Eris on an Attic black-figure cup, c. 550–540 BC, Antikensammlung Berlin.

Eris is a trans-Neptunian dwarf planet discovered in 2005 by a team led by Michael E. Brown. Its discovery contributed to the reclassification of Pluto as a dwarf planet in 2006, following the definition adopted by the International Astronomical Union. In Greek mythology, Eris is the goddess of discord and strife, associated with the myth of the Golden Apple that preceded the Trojan War.

In contemporary astrology, Eris has been incorporated into some modern interpretative systems. Astrological interpretations commonly associate Eris with themes of discord, rivalry, marginalization, and challenges to established hierarchies. It has also been described as symbolizing the exposure of latent or suppressed conflicts within social and relational structures.

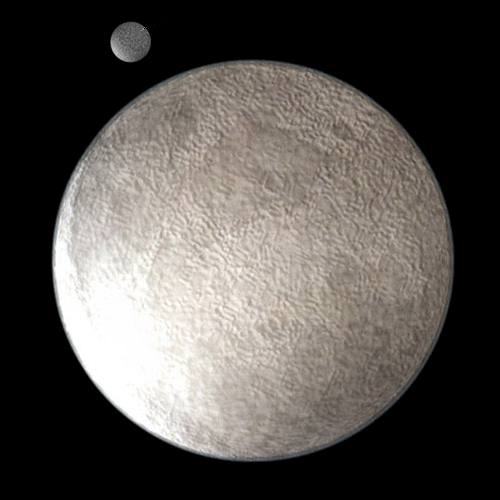
Artist's impression of Eris and its satellite Dysnomia.

Some astrologers link Eris to dynamics involving competition, emulation, and the expression of previously alienated or unacknowledged desires. In this context, it is interpreted as reflecting processes through which tension or imbalance becomes visible.

A number of modern astrologers have proposed Eris as a contemporary ruler of Libra ♎️, emphasizing themes of justice, relational balance, and systemic tension. This association, however, is not part of traditional astrological doctrine and remains limited to certain contemporary schools of thought. Some modern interpretations even propose its symbolic exaltation in Sagittarius ♐️, although this concept belongs exclusively to contemporary astrology and is not part of the classical tradition.

== Other Solar System bodies ==
Some most massive asteroids such as Pallas and Vesta, can sometimes be observed with binoculars (Vesta occasionally with the naked eye). Discovered in the early 19th century, Ceres, Juno, Pallas, and Vesta were initially classified as planets before being reclassified as asteroids (Ceres has changed its category for the third time, going from asteroid to dwarf planet).

Since the discovery of Chiron in 1977, some astrologers have incorporated it into natal charts as a significant factor, although astronomers classify it as a centaur, a class of small Solar System body orbiting between Jupiter and Neptune.

In the 21st century, several additional trans-Neptunian dwarf planets have been discovered, including Sedna, Quaoar, Orcus, Gonggong, Haumea, Makemake, and Eris.

Although these bodies have not been incorporated into mainstream astrological practice to the same extent as Pluto or even Chiron, some modern and avant-garde schools of astrology have experimented with integrating them into natal and mundane analysis.

Comets and novae have been observed and discussed for several millennia. Comets in particular were regarded as omens in many ancient cultures and were given various astrological interpretations. Due to their irregular visibility and transient nature, however, they are generally not included in most modern natal astrological systems.

== Fictitious and hypothetical planets ==
Some astrologers have hypothesized about the existence of unseen or undiscovered planets, which have not coincided with scientific hypotheses (such as hypothesized planets beyond Neptune). In 1918, astrologer Sepharial proposed the existence of Earth's "Dark Moon" Lilith, and since then, some astrologers have been using it in their charts; though the same name is also (and now, more commonly) used in astrology to refer to the axis of the actual Moon's orbit.

Some astrologers have focused on the theory that in time, all twelve signs of the zodiac will each have their own ruler, so that another two planets have yet to be discovered; namely the "true" rulers of Gemini and Taurus. The names of the planets mentioned in this regard by some are Pallas (ruler of Taurus) and Apollo, the Roman god of the Sun (ruler of Gemini). Dane Rudhyar, for instance, proposed that the true ruler of Taurus is an undiscovered trans-Neptunian planet which he named Proserpine.

The Thema Mundi

== Ruling planets of the astrological signs and houses ==
In Western astrology, the symbolism associated with the planets also relates to the zodiac signs and houses of the horoscope in their various rulerships. For instance, the description of Mars is masculine, impulsive, and active. Aries is ruled by Mars and has a similar description, representing an active, masculine archetype. Similarly, the first house is also ruled by Mars, and deals with a person's physical health and strength, and the manner in which they project themselves.

Table 1: Modern signs, houses and planetary associations

Sign	House	Ruling ancient	Ruling modern	Domicile	Exaltation	Detriment	Fall
Aries	1st House	Mars	Pluto	Mars	Sun	Venus, Eris	Saturn
Taurus	2nd House	Venus		Venus	Moon	Pluto, Mars	Uranus
Gemini	3rd House	Mercury		Mercury	Ceres	Jupiter, Neptune	Eris
Cancer	4th House	Moon		Moon	Jupiter	Saturn	Mars
Leo	5th House	Sun		Sun	Neptune	Uranus	Pluto
Virgo	6th House	Mercury	Ceres	Ceres, Mercury	Mercury	Neptune, Jupiter	Venus
Libra	7th House	Venus	Eris	Venus, Eris	Saturn	Mars, Pluto	Sun
Scorpio	8th House	Mars	Pluto	Pluto, Mars	Uranus	Venus	Moon
Sagittarius	9th House	Jupiter		Jupiter, Neptune	Eris	Mercury	Ceres
Capricorn	10th House	Saturn		Saturn	Mars	Moon	Jupiter
Aquarius	11th House	Saturn	Uranus	Uranus	Pluto	Sun	Neptune
Pisces	12th House	Jupiter	Neptune	Neptune, Jupiter	Venus	Mercury, Ceres	Mercury

Note: The planets in the table rule the signs on the same row, and the houses correspond with the signs on the same row (i.e. Mars rules Aries; Aries and first house share some correspondences). However, it is only modern astrology that links the planets to the houses in this order.

Table 2: Traditional Chaldean houses and planetary relationships.

House	Traditional Ruling planet
1st House	Saturn
2nd House	Jupiter
3rd House	Mars
4th House	Sun
5th House	Venus
6th House	Mercury
7th House	Moon
8th House	Saturn
9th House	Jupiter
10th House	Mars
11th House	Sun
12th House	Venus

== See also ==
- Asteroids in astrology
- Houses in astrology
- Stars in astrology
- Classical planet
- Planetae
- The Planets, an orchestral suite themed around the planets in astrology
- Mandaean cosmology § Planets
