= Domicile (astrology) =

Zodiac sign over which a planet rules

In astrology, a planet's domicile (less commonly home, not to be confused with the astrological house system) is the zodiacal sign over which it has rulership. A planetary ruler is given to each sign, over which the planet is said to have a more powerful influence when positioned therein. The ruling planet associated with a sign is also used as an implied focus of interpretation for the signs on house cusps in a chart. A planet is considered to be in domal dignity when it is positioned in the sign it rules. This is the strongest of the five essential dignities of a planet. Domicile is an archaic term in infrequent, specialist uses today; most astrologers use the simpler term "sign".

== Overview ==
The assignments of the ruling planets appear to be based upon the Northern Hemisphere seasons, as the sun (Sol) and the moon, the principal bearers of light and heat, were awarded to Leo and Cancer, respectively, since the months the sun passed through these signs (in ancient times) were the warmest and had the longest days.

Conversely, Saturn, the most distant (and hence the "coldest") of the planets known to ancients, was accorded the rulership of Aquarius and Capricorn, the signs opposite Leo and Cancer, respectively.

Jupiter, being next farthest away, was given the signs on either side of Aquarius and Capricorn (Pisces and Sagittarius), and Mars, next in order, received the next two (Aries and Scorpio).

Since Mercury never appears more than one sign from the sun in either direction, it was deemed to rule the two signs on either side of Leo and Cancer (Virgo and Gemini), and since Venus can never be found more than two signs from the Sun, it obtained the rulership of Libra and Taurus.

The discovery of planets outside of the geocentric field of vision in modern times provided a dilemma for astrologers, which most eventually resolved by a consensus declaring Uranus to be Aquarius' ruling planet while assigning Neptune to Pisces and later, Pluto, considered the higher octave of Mars, was given to Scorpio.

Some modern authorities use the concept of "night rulerships" to find room for additional dignities. Uranus was designated the day ruler of Aquarius while Saturn was to be its night ruler. Similarly, Neptune was the day ruler of Pisces, leaving Jupiter as the night ruler, and Pluto was the day ruler of Scorpio with Mars as the night ruler.

The use of dual rulerships in a manner such as this was also known as "co-rulership". Some astrologers believed that the new co-rulers were primary rulers of the signs with which they were associated and might have been sole rulers of those signs, and if that was the case, two other planets, one linked to Libra or Taurus, and the other to Virgo or Gemini, may await discovery, thus eliminating the need for dual rulership of a sign. Although the status of Ceres has not been conclusively decided at the moment in astrology, it has been suggested as the ruler of Virgo or Taurus. For some modern astrologers including many European astrologers, it is the ruling planet of Virgo based upon observation of its role in synastric charts. Significantly, the generation of astrologers who first encountered Ceres in the early 19th century after its discovery, before its demotion to an asteroid in the middle of the 19th century, assigned it rulership of Virgo. For a minority of astrologers, it is the ruling planet of Taurus along with Venus.

== Rulership of houses ==
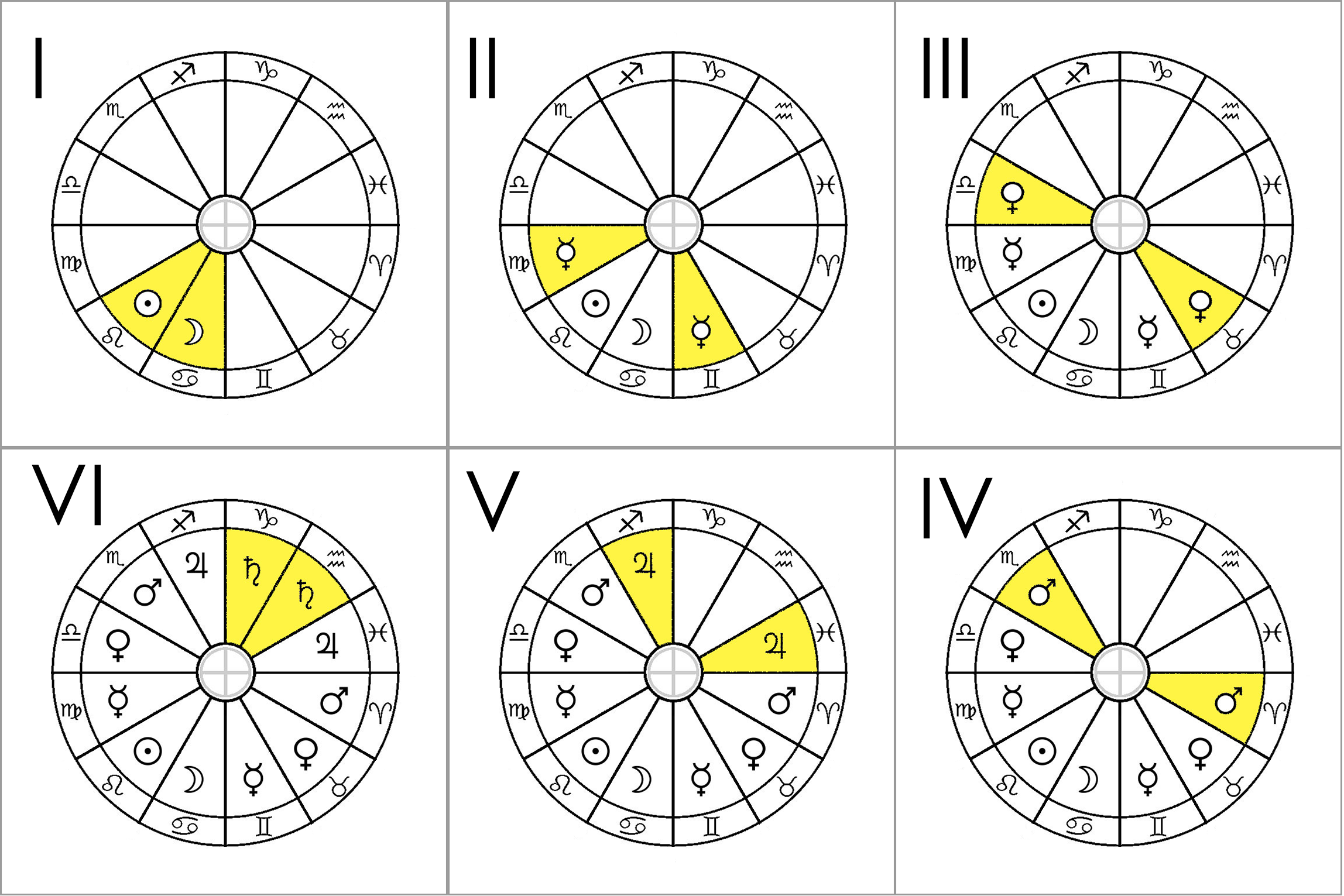
Sign rulerships in "Tetrabiblos" by Claudius Ptolemy.

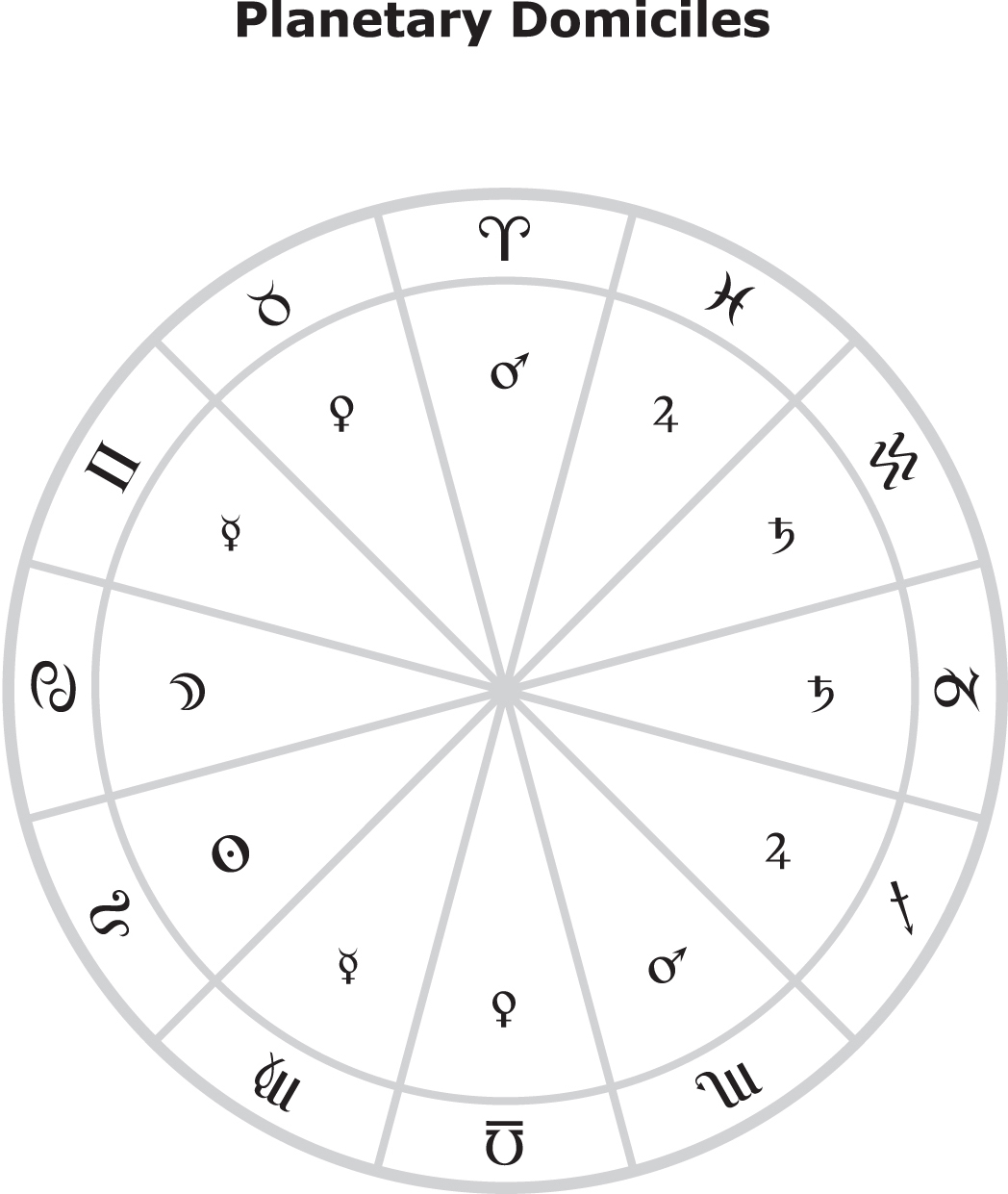
Ancient planetary sign rulership scheme.

The Thema Mundi.

Some modern astrologers assign what is called "natural" rulership of each house of the horoscope to a different planet, in the same way as the zodiac signs are said to have rulers. Traditionally, however, the rulership of houses was understood to apply only in the individual birth-chart, in what is called "accidental" rulership. This understanding is followed by most astrologers. In this case, the rulership of a house in the "native's" horoscope is associated with the planets that rule the sign on the cusp of the house and with any planets found on or near the house cusp. The ruling planet guides the expression of the planets occupying that house, similar to the way a planet on the ASC expresses and mediates the expression of planets throughout the chart as they filter through one's personality (symbolized by the ASC and 1st house.)

There are several different scenarios that one can use to determine the rulership of a house:

- If the first house cusp is, say, 0 degrees Aries and the second house cusp is 0 degrees Taurus, the house will be ruled solely by Aries.
- If, for example, the second house cusp is 25 degrees Taurus and the third house cusp is 22 degrees Gemini then the 2nd house will have Venus as its primary ruler and Mercury as its secondary ruler since the majority of the house falls in Gemini. The closer the beginning of a sign is to a house cusp, the more power its planetary ruler has in that house. Some astrologers do not consider secondary rulers of houses in this type of scenario but only rulers of house cusps which are primary.
- If, as an example, the fourth house cusp is 25 degrees Capricorn and the fifth house cusp is 8 degrees Pisces then the house will have Aquarius intercepted. It will have Saturn as its primary ruler, but in addition to Saturn, Uranus, will play a role in the matters of the house though in a more hidden and less obvious way. Neptune will also play a role if any planets are in Pisces between 0-7 degrees.
- If a house cusp or angle is at 29 degrees of any sign, the following sign's ruler will be the house's co-ruler. Some apply this rule of shared rulership for angles that are 25-29 degrees of a mutable sign, within 5 degrees of a cardinal solstice or equinox point.

When a person attempts to determine the rulership of a house, the more planets or bodies that rule the house, the more complex the matters of that house will be. Especially when aspects to the rulers are considered. Generally, the sign on the cusp will be the outward representation of the rulership. The ruler of the sign inside the house will not be readily apparent but will manifest itself at critical points in a person's life and in deciding life directions. Meaning, the ruler of the sign inside the house imparts its values and shares 'executive decision' making but is not involved in the actions taken or the outward expression of matters of that house.

As in the case of intercepted houses, the sign that is in the middle of the house is the sign that the native must transcend before he can progress to the next phase of the house's rulership. Therefore, as in the previous example, if a house is intercepted with the sign of Capricorn then the native must will initially present with many Capricorn qualities and will have to work somewhat behind the scenes to get the Aquarian qualities to express. Ultimately, intercepted Aquarius and Uranus will express itself but be mediated strongly through Capricorn and its ruler, Saturn.

== Rulerships of signs ==
| House | Sign | Ruling planet (ancient) | Ruling body (Hindu astrology) | Ruling body (modern) | Sign Detriment |
|---|---|---|---|---|---|
| 1st | Aries | Mars | | | Libra |
| 2nd | Taurus | Venus | | Earth | Scorpio |
| 3rd | Gemini | Mercury | | | Sagittarius |
| 4th | Cancer | Moon | | | Capricorn |
| 5th | Leo | Sun | | | Aquarius |
| 6th | Virgo | Mercury | | | Pisces |
| 7th | Libra | Venus | | | Aries |
| 8th | Scorpio | Mars | Ketu | Pluto | Taurus |
| 9th | Sagittarius | Jupiter | | | Gemini |
| 10th | Capricorn | Saturn | | | Cancer |
| 11th | Aquarius | Saturn | Rahu | Uranus | Leo |
| 12th | Pisces | Jupiter | | Neptune | Virgo |

Many modern astrologers still use Mars as the primary ruler of Scorpio, with Pluto as a secondary ruler. A distinction should be made between ancient, traditional, and modern rulerships, particularly because ancient astrology does not appear to have assigned sign rulerships in the way they are commonly understood today. The ancients did assign domal dignity to the north and south nodes of the Moon, although these are not considered rulerships since the nodes do not govern any signs.

Significant disagreement exists within the Western astrological community about which signs are said to share rulers, and this issue has been slow to resolve. Numerous suggestions have been made, but consensus may take decades, as it did in the cases of Uranus and Neptune.

== Dispositors ==
A dispositor is a delineation of planetary rulership to the signs. For instance, if Mercury is in Libra, its disposition is Venus, if Venus is in turn in Sagittarius, its disposition is Jupiter, and if Jupiter is Cancer its disposition is the Moon. This process continues until there is a final disposition (sign in its rulership) or it circles in a never-ending chain of command.

== Usage ==

Signs with colors associated
with their ruling planets

Classical astrologers whose methods are rooted in traditional methods do not use any of the outer planets not recognized by the ancients as the rulers of any of the 12 signs, preferring the traditional rulership scheme.

On the other hand, most modern, psychologically-oriented astrologers do use the outer planets as ruling planets of those particular three signs listed above. Others also use ancient rulers while using modern planets as the co-ruler of those signs.

Other astrologers do not use any of the planets as sign rulers (Cosmobiologists, Uranian astrologers, Hamburg School of Astrology, other groups/individuals), preferring to focus more on the astrological aspects and other portions of the horoscope instead that lend themselves more easily to empirical study.

Most astrologers practicing Vedic astrology (Jyotish) only use the traditional rulership system.

== See also ==
- Planets in astrology
- Exaltation
- Astrological sign
- Horoscope
- Solar system in astrology
- Asteroids in astrology
