= Drekkana =

Equal to 1/3 of a sign in Hindu astrology

Drekkana (Sanskrit: द्रेष्काण or द्रेक्काण) is one of the sixteen main vargas (divisions of a sign) described by Parasara to Maitreya who wanted to be explained about the different kinds of houses (Brihat Parasara Hora Sastra (Sl. VI.1). Parasara states that relationship with co-borns is to be judged from the drekkanas occupied by planets. All standard ancient texts on Hindu astrology describe these vargas. The actual disposition of a planet is properly known from its occupation of these sixteen vargas. These sixteen sub-divisional charts which are one of the four dimensions of astrology are a basic ingredient of Hindu astrology, and each sub-divisional chart is firstly required to be studied independently and then collectively as one. M. Ramakrishna Bhat is of the opinion that drekkana is not a Sanskrit word but borrowed from the Greek.

Drekkana is one third equal part of a sign (Rasi) or 1/36 part of the Zodiac; the first part is ruled by the lord of the very sign that is referred to, the second part is ruled by the lord of the 5th sign from that sign and the third part is ruled by the lord of the 9th sign from the sign in question. However, Rudra states that some interpret the said Parasari rule as lords of the 5th and the 9th navamsas whereas the Kalpa Latha of Somanatha states that the twelve drekkanas from Mesha ('Aries') to Karaka ('Cancer') will have for their lords, the rulers of the twelve signs, in clock-wise symmetrical order from Mesha and similarly for the rest i.e. from Simha ('Leo') and from Dhaunus ('Sagittarius'). And, there is also the Parivritti Thrayapaksha method recommended in the Vriddha Karikas of Jaimini which suggests the lordship as per the scheme followed while erecting the Navamsa Chart. Varahamihira subscribes to the Parasari method and describes all thirty-six drekkanas (Brihat Jataka Ch.XXVII). A planet gains strength when it is in its own drekkana. He recommends the use of the drekkana occupied by the Sun at the time of query for ascertaining the lagna when the time of birth is not known.

Kalyanavarma in the 49th Chapter of his Saravali explains the result of birth in individual drekkanas or 'decanates' which are applicable only if – द्रेक्काणभे वीर्यवति स्वद्रष्टे द्रेक्काणकल्पं तु फलं विदध्यात् - the drekkana and its lord are strong or the aspect of the lord of the drekkana falls on the drekkana (Saravali (Sl. 49.37)). The Drekkana Chart or 'the third Harmonic Chart' indicates relationship with the co-borns; when the lord of the 3rd house is posited in a friendly drekkana, it indicates good results. A planet occupying its own drekkana confers virtues; the Moon similarly situated endows one with best of qualities of body and mind, and the lord of the lagna occupying the first, second or the third drekkana makes one a judge, a ruler of a mandal or head of a village i.e. attain high position respectively. B V Raman in his book, “How to Judge a Horoscope (Vol.1)” has explained the impact of planets in various drekkanas and their lords on the financial position of individuals. He states that the person will remain happy all his life if the lord of the lagna occupies a friendly drekkana.

The importance of drekkana-wise placement of planets and the bhava-lords is revealed by the ancient texts. Garga with regard to a sensitive issue states that if the Moon is situated in Sagittarius or Pisces or in a drekkana or navamsa ruled by Jupiter or if it joins Jupiter in any sign, the person will not be born of adultery. And, Sarvartha Chintamani tells us that if the lord of the 5th house is aspected or conjunct by the lord of the drekkana in which lord of navamsa occupied by the lord of the 12th house, there will be sorrow on account of children. The bad manner of death of a native is indicated by the adverse situation and association of certain drekkana-lords. Sarvartha Chintamani states - a) When the drekkana occupied by the lord of the 8th falls in Pasa (the first drekkana of Capricorn), Sarpa (the third drekkana of Cancer or joins Saturn, Māndi or Rahu, one dies by imprisonment or hanging. b) If the lord of the drekkana occupied by Saturn is in the sign or navamsa ruled by Mars and is aspected by Mars, one meets with death in battle. c) If Venus or the Moon is in debilitation sign in the 4th house and the lord of the 7th occupies a Pasa or Sarpa drekkana, wife will die by hanging. Venkatesa further states that if the lord of the drekkana occupied by the lord of the 11th house is a benefic planet and is aspected by the lord of the 10th, there will be much money, and with regard to the state after death he states - If the lord of the drekkana occupied by the most powerful among the two planets, the Sun and the Moon, happens to be Jupiter, the person gets into Devaloka, if that lord is the Moon or Venus, then one goes to Pitruloka, and if that be the Sun, Mars or Mercury, he goes to hell; if that lord also receives beneficial aspects the person attains an important position in the loka he ascends, if it is exalted will have exalted loka, if debilitated he will go to Naraka loka. Venus situated in a cruel drekkana gives fear from enemies, imprisonment and great misery, chains and troubles from robbers.

In the Tajik system, the division of each sign into three parts or decanates is governed by the so-called Chaldean system which entered the art of Tajik by way of the Middle East.

== See also ==
- Decans
