= Saravali (disambiguation) =

Saravali may refer to:

- Saravali, a village in Greece
- Sārāvalī, an Indian astrological treatise
- Saravali, Bhiwandi, a village in Maharashtra, India
- Saravali, Dahanu, a village in Maharashtra, India
