= Varga (astrology) =

Division of a zodiacal sign in Indian astrology

The term Varga (Sanskrit varga, 'set, division') in Indian astrology (Jyotisha) refers to the division of a zodiacal sign (rāśi) into parts. Each such fractional part of a sign, known as an aṃśa, has a source of influence associated with it, so that these sources of influence come to be associated with collections of regions around the zodiac.

There are sixteen varga, or divisional, charts used in Jyotisha. These vargas form the basis of a unique system of finding the auspiciousness or inauspiciousness of planets.

== Overview ==
Hindu astrology divides the zodiac into several types of segments; these subtle divisions or divisional charts are called Vargas and are said to be the various micro-zodiacs created within the natural macro-zodiac, the Horoscope.

The particular location of planets in the Varga charts materially influences the results of planets constituting a yoga. The two sets of vargas that are commonly used are – a) the Shadvarga i.e. the six-fold division of sign namely, the Rasi or sign, the Hora, the Drekkena or decanate, the Navamsa, the Dwadasamsa and the Trimsamsa, and b) the Saptavarga i.e. the seven-fold division, by tagging the Saptamsa to the Shadvargas. Some follow the Dasavargas or the ten-fold division, and in his Bṛhat Parāśara Horāśāstra, Parasara speaks about the Shodasvarga or the sixteen-fold division of a rasi. Planets become more auspicious if they are in same zodiac sign in shodasa varga or 16 divisional charts. Accordingly, the status thus acquired by planets stands graded for easy identification etc. When a planet acquires two out of sixteen such vargas(divisional charts) or divisions then it is known to have gained the status called the Parijatamsa or Bhedakamsa, when three vargas are gained then the Uttamamsa or Kusumamsa or Vyanjanamsa, four – the Gopuramsa or Naagpushpamsa or Kimshukamsa or Chaamaramsa, five – the Simhasanamsa or Kundakamsa or Chhatramsa, six – the Parvatamsa or Keralamsa or Kundalamsa, seven – the Devalokamsa or Kalpavrkshamsa or Mukatamsa, eight – the Kumkumamsa or Brahmalokamsa or Chandanvanamsa, nine – the Iravatamsa or Poornachandramsa, ten – the Vyshnavamsa or Shridham or Ucchaishrvamsa, eleven – the Saivamsa Dhanvantriamsa, twelve – the Bhaswadamsa or Suryakantamsa, thirteen – the Vaisheshikamsa or Vidrumamsa, fourteen – the Indrasanamsa, fifteen – the Golokamsa, and sixteen – the Shrivallabhamsa (Bṛhat Parāśara Horāśāstra Slokas 42-51) (Sarvartha Chintamani St.32-35).

== Divisional charts ==
The Bṛhat Parāśara Horāśāstra defines sixteen divisional schemes, each named according to the denominator of the fraction specific to the division. Thus, the integral fraction is division by 1, which yields, trivially, 12 regions of the zodiac corresponding to the 12 signs themselves: perforce this varga scheme is named rāśi. Similarly, a divisor of 2 defines 24 regions; the name horā, derived from the word अहो-रात्र (aho-rātra) meaning day-night by removing the first अ (a) and last sounds त्र (tra) {Reference: Saravali by Kalyanaverma (Sanskrit Classic)}, is etymologically related to the analogous 24 hours in a day. The divisor of 3 defining 36 regions, named drekkana, is similarly related to the Decans of Chaldean horology.

Varga	Divisor	Chart	Area of Influence
Rasi	1	D-1	Body, Physical Matters and all General Matters
Hora	2	D-2	Wealth, Family
Drekkana	3	D-3	Siblings, Nature
Chaturthamsa	4	D-4	Fortune and Property
Saptamsa	7	D-7	Children/Progeny
Navamsa	9	D-9	Spouse, Dharma and Relationships
Dasamsa	10	D-10	Actions in Society, Profession
Dvadasamsa	12	D-12	Parents (Paternal and Maternal Legacies)
Shodasamsa	16	D-16	Vehicles, Travelling and Comforts
Vimsamsa	20	D-20	Spiritual Pursuits
ChaturVimsamsa	24	D-24	Education, Learning and Knowledge (Academic Achievements)
SaptaVimsamsa	27	D-27	Strengths and Weakness
Trimsamsa	30	D-30	Evils
KhaVedamsa	40	D-40	For auspicious and inauspicious effects in horoscope
AkshaVedamsa	45	D-45	For all general indications (character and conduct of the native)
Shastiamsa	60	D-60	For all general indications (Past birth or Karma of the native)

Four other vargas are attributed to Jaimini:

Varga	Divisor	Chart	Area of Influence
Panchamsa	5	D-5	Fame & Power
Shasthamsa	6	D-6	Health
Ashtamsa	8	D-8	Unexpected Troubles
EkaDasamsa/Rudramsa	11	D-11	Death and Destruction

Besides Rāshi (D-1), Navamsha (D-9), Drekana (D-3), Dasamsa (D-10), Trimsamsa (D-30) and Sashtiamsa (D-60) are considered significant divisional charts.

== Implication ==
A planet situated in any one rasi i.e. sign, by itself constitutes a yoga or an ava-yoga owing to the relationship it establishes with the rasi-lord and other bhava-lords with reference to the Lagna and each other, but its mere occupation need not necessarily produce the results assigned for its such occupation. No planet acts alone, it becomes an active participant by having established an unavoidable relationship with one or more other planets; its assigned results are influenced by the rasi and the vargas gained, that is, according to the varga-wise status gained by it and the associating planets. The failure of the yogas to give the expected results can also be due to the varga-wise weak status of the dispositors of the yoga-forming planets rather than the weakness of these planets. The Sun situated in the 9th house from the lagna but not in an inimical sign or navamsa gives wealth, sons, friends and piety even though it makes one antagonistic towards father and wife and not experience happiness. However, the Sun as the lagna-lord exalted in the 9th makes the person and his father fortunate, have many brothers and friends, intelligent, adept, influential and renowned; in case the exalted Sun in the 9th is in its own navamsa or in vargottama but aspected by a friendly planet, he will enjoy Raja yoga.

Janardan Harji in his Mansagari states that if at the time of birth any planet occupies a friendly sign or its own sign or is in its exaltation sign in a trikonabhava (trine) then that planet having gained many favourable vargas gives its assigned good results in full. One such planet makes one wealthy, and two adept, successful and renowned. In the section devoted to arishtas and arishtabhanga of Chapter IV he reiterates that if at birth a strong (varga-wise) Mercury or Venus or Jupiter is situated in a kendrasthana from the lagna even if combined with an evil planet, it will single-handedly soon destroy all arishtas, and that the Moon situated in the 8th house from the lagna in a drekkena owned by Jupiter, Venus or Mercury will confer a long lease of life.

Parasara states that the Moon in mutual aspect with Venus gives rise to Raja yoga; the person born with the Moon in Vargottma navamsa or in Goparamsa aspected by all strong planets will be a ruler even if lowly-born, three planets aspecting such Moon will make a person born in a royal family a king. A Raja yoga arises if the birth ascendant or hora-lagna or ghati-lagna is occupied by one or more planets occupying their exaltation, own or moola-trikona rasi, navamsa or drekkena; a person will certainly become a ruler if the concerned lagna equipped with unobstructed argala is occupied by Jupiter, Venus or the Moon (Bṛhat Parāśara Horāśāstra XXXV.14-16, 37). If the lord of a kendrasthana and a trikonabhava combining having gained favourable vargas give rise to Raja yoga; having gained Uttamamsa they will make a person a very wealthy ruler, if in Gopuramsa that person will be honoured by other rulers and if in Simhasanamsa the person will be a great ever-victorious ruling a large kingdom (Bṛhat Parāśara Horāśāstra XXXVI.18-20).

Venkatesa in his Sarvartha Chintamani (Slokas I.29 & 112) explains that planets occupying the cruel Shashtiamsas (1/60th division of a sign) produce evil results, planets in good Shashtiamsas, and which planets are also occupying good vargas or divisions become powerful to confer good results and that planets in exaltation, in friendly signs, own navamsas, own rasis, drekkenas, shodasmsas and trimsamsas possess Sthanabala and exercise the most favourable influence.

== See also ==
- Jyotiṣa
