= Preshya yoga =

Malefic Hindu planetary combination

Preṣya yoga (Sanskrit: प्रेष्य योग) is a planetary combination in Hindu astrology. A person born with preshya yoga is poor, unhappy and uneducated. He hears harsh words from others and works in slavery throughout his life.

The term comes from the Sanskrit word preṣya which means "servant."

== Vedic usage ==
In Aitareya Brahmana, the term preṣya occurs in the sense of a menial servant, Śudra or a slave employed for being sent on an errand. In Pali texts of Buddhists, preṣya is referred to in its prakritic forms – pessa or pesiya - meaning a messenger or a servant in general. However, in early literature there is hardly any elucidation regarding the nature of job, their person, or mode of dressing etc., that is available. Bharuchi (600-650 A.D.) in his commentary on Manu states that preṣya were a servile class different from the four types of slaves.

Bhattoji Dikshita states (Siddhahta Haumadi Ch.XIV.621) :

प्रेष्यब्रुवोर्हविषो देवतसंप्रदाने

that "the object of the verb preṣya and bruhi (imperative singular of Divadi verb, meaning send or utter) denoting sacrifial food, takes the sixth case-affix, when making offerings to deity is meant or when the deity is the recipient " (Shatapatha Brahmana I.5.3.8). Valmiki states (Ramayana Sundar Kanda 39.39):

अहं तावदिह प्राप्तः किं पुनस्ते महाबल |
नहि प्रकृष्टाः प्रेष्यन्ते प्र्ष्यन्ते हीतरे जनाः ||

that honourable people are never asked to work as preṣyas.

== Usage in Hindu astrology ==
Mahadeva tells us that a) if the lord of the 10th house is weak and associated with papagrahas ('dire malefics') or b) if Mercury combining with either Jupiter or Venus is in a trika-bhava (the 6th,8th or 12th from the lagna) or c) if the 10th house receives the aspects of many papagrahas, or d) if the lord of the 10th house is relegated to an evil bhava, then the person is inept and inefficient. He also states that if the 12th house from the lagna is heavily afflicted by papagrahas the person will suffer loss of wealth repeatedly, and that in case the lagna or the 2nd house or the 11th house and their respective lords are afflicted while placed in cruel shashtiamsas in evil bhavas then one suffers want of wealth throughout life and contracts debts. These yogas indicate penury but are not preṣya yogas.

In Chapter VI of his Jataka Parijata, Vaidyanatha Dikshita provides the following preṣya yogas leading to servitude:-

1) If the Sun is in the 10th house from the lagna, the Moon occupies the 7th, Mars the 3rd and Jupiter is in the 2nd house, one serves others at night-time.
2) If a fixed sign (Scorpio or Aquarius) rises in the lagna, Jupiter owns the 2nd house and occupies the 8th, Venus is in the 9th and the Moon in the 7th, then one serves others.
3) If the night-time birth is in a moveable sign and the lord of the lagna is in Riksha-sandhi and papagrahas occupy the kendras, one serves others.
4) If the day-time birth is in a fixed sign and Saturn, the Moon, Jupiter and Venus are in rasi-sandhi or if a person is born during Krishna-paksha night-time, Venus is in the lagna, the Moon even if in Uttama-vargas is not in a kendra and Jupiter in Airavatansh is in rasi-sandhi, one serves others.
5) If Mars, Jupiter and the Sun situated in the 3rd, 4th and the 10th bhavas in bhava-sandhi or rasi-sandhi, the Moon though in a benefic sign is in an evil navamsa and Jupiter combines with the lord of the lagna, one serves others
6) If Jupiter is in a trika-bhava in Capricorn sign and the Moon occupies the 4th house, one serves others.

He states:

पापात्मा कलहप्रियः कथिन्वाग् भुदेवतादूषको विद्याभाग्यविहीन दुष्टरसिको मात्सर्यकोपान्वितः |
मिथ्यावादविनोदवञ्चनरतः शिश्नोदरे तत्परः कारुण्यास्थिरमाननभङ्गिचतुरो योगे परप्रेष्यके ||

"The person born with preṣya yoga will be evil-minded, quarrelsome, harsh in speech, disrespectful, unfortunate, a favourite of evil persons, envious, evil-tempered, liar, deceiver, selfish, fraudulent and frequently insulted by others."

== Significance ==
Vaidyanatha Dikshita explains that there are yogas that indicate cancellation of Raja Yogas, there are the Reka Yogas which are Daridra Yogas when a person though wealthy leads a slovenly life, and there are the preṣya yogas whose presence makes one lead a lowly life throughout one's life-time as a menial or a slave (Jataka Parijata VI.1). The presence of these ashubha yogas along with other evil yogas produce very bad results; if occurring with Paisacha Yoga serious mental illness or derangement is bound to result.
