= Samāsa Saṃhitā =

Lost astrology work by Varāhamihira

- Author: Varāhamihira
- Original title: समाससंहिता
- Language: Sanskrit
- Subject: Astrology
- Publication date: 6th-century CE
- Publication place: possibly Aulikara kingdom (present-day India)

Samāsa Saṃhitā is a lost work on astrology by the 6th-century astrologer-astronomer Varāhamihira of present-day central India. An abridged version of Bṛhat Saṃhitā, it is known from excerpts in Utpala's commentary on the Bṛhat Saṃhitā.

== History ==
Samāsa Saṃhitā ("Minor Collection"), also known as Svalpa-saṃhitā ("Shorter Compendium"), is an abridged version of Bṛhat Saṃhitā, Varāhamihira's work on natural astrology. It is now lost, but at least 142 verses on it survive in Saṃhitā-vivṛti, Utpala's commentary on the Bṛhat Saṃhitā, often identifiable by the phrase "tatha cha Samāsa-saṃhitāyam". The Samāsa Saṃhitā is the fourth most cited work in Saṃhitā-vivṛti, after the works of Parashara, Garga, and Kāshyapa.

The Samāsa Saṃhitā definitely existed in the 9th century CE, when Utpala mentioned it. It was probably lost by the 11th century, when Al-Biruni wrote about Varāhamihira but did not mention it.

== Contents ==
Samāsa Saṃhitā was an abridged version of the Brihat-saṃhitā, and borrowed some verses from it verbatim. However, it also contained some new content, as evident from the extracts from Utpala's commentary. For example, it mentions a legend about the sage Agastya devouring the demon Vatapi, which is absent from the Brihat-saṃhitā. Similarly, only the Samāsa Saṃhitā mentions that the Varāhamihira's method of gauging rainfall is based on the Magadha system mentioned in the Artha-shastra.

Ajay Mitra Shastri reconstructed a part of Samāsa Saṃhitā from Utpala's commentary on the Bṛhat Saṃhitā. Shastri's edition was published in the journal Bharātīya Vidyā volume 23.
