= Shashtyamsha =

Star sign division in Hindu astrology

Shashtiamsa (Sanskrit: षष्ट्यांश) - meaning the 60th division, in Hindu astrology refers to the 60th division or varga of a Rasi or Sign equally divided or half-degree each. It is one of the sixteen shodasvargas that are considered important and relevant to important aspects of life. Virupas, a measure of planetary or bhava strength, are also known as Shashtiamsas.

== Parasara’s explanation ==
In his Bṛhat Parāśara Horāśāstra, Parasara has defined the sixteen shodasvargas; with regards to the Shashtiamsa sub-division of a sign he states – ignore the sign position of a planet and take the degrees etc. it traversed in that sign. Multiply that figure by 2 and divide by 12, then, add 1 to the remainder which will indicate the sign in which the Shashtiamsa falls; the lord of that sign is the planet ruling the said Shashtiamsa. He has listed in a particular order the names of the sixty shashtiamsas falling in odd signs which order, he says, should be reversed for even signs. Planets in benefic shashtiamsas produce auspicious results while the opposite is true in case of planets in malefic shashtiamsas. In the context of varga classification he clarifies that the divisions falling in the planet’s exaltation sign, moolatrikona sign, own sign, and the signs owned by the lord of a kendra (angle) from the graha arudha are all to be considered as good vargas but not those divisions of a combust planet, defeated planet, weak planet and a planet in bad avastha situated wherein situated planets destroy yogas .

== List showing names and order of Shashtiāmsās ==
S.No.ODD signs up to	Shashtiamsa	Benefic or Malefic	S.No.EVEN signs
1	Ghorānsh	Malefic	60
2	Rākshasa	Malefic	59
3	Deva	Benefic	58
4	Kuber	Benefic	57
5	Rakshogana	Benefic	56
6	Kinnar	Benefic	55
7	Bhrshta	Malefic	54
8	Kulaghna	Malefic	53
9	Garala	Malefic	52
10	Agni	Malefic	51
11	Māyā	Malefic	50
12	Yama	Malefic	49
13	Varuna	Benefic	48
14	Indra	Benefic	47
15	Kāla	Malefic	46
16	Ahibhāga	Benefic	45
17	Amrtānshu	Benefic	44
18	Chandra	Benefic	43
19	Madu	Benefic	42
20	Komala	Benefic	41
21	Padma	Benefic	40
22	Vishnu	Benefic	39
23	Vāgāsh	Benefic	38
24	Dingchar	Benefic	37
25	Dava	Benefic	36
26	Ārdra	Benefic	35
27	Kālanāsha	Malefic	34
28	Kshitish	Benefic	33
29	Kamalākar	Benefic	32
30	Manda	Malefic	31
31	Mrtyu	Malefic	30
32	Kāla	Malefic	29
33	Dāvagni	Malefic	28
34	Ghora	Malefic	27
35	Maya	Malefic	26
36	Kantaka	Malefic	25
37	Sudhā	Benefic	24
38	Amrta	Benefic	23
39	Poornachandra	Benefic	22
40	Vishpradimā	Malefic	21
41	Kulanāsha	Malefic	20
42	Mukhya	Benefic	19
43	Vanshakshya	Malefic	18
44	Utpāta	Malefic	17
45	Kālroopa	Benefic	16
46	Saomaya	Benefic	15
47	Mrdu	Benefic	14
48	Sheetala	Benefic	13
49	Danshtrākarā	Malefic	12
50	Indumukha	Malefic	11
51	Praveena	Benefic	10
52	Kālagni	Malefic	9
53	Dandayudha	Benefic	8
54	Nirmala	Benefic	7
55	Shubha	Benefic	6
56	Ashubha	Benefic	5
57	Atisheeta	Benefic	4
58	Sudhāyoga	Benefic	3
59	Bhramana	Malefic	2
60	Indurekhā	Benefic	1

== Venkatesa’s interpretation ==
Venkatesa in his Sarvartha Chintamani (Slokas I.29 & 112) explains that planets occupying cruel Shashtiamsas (1/60th division of a sign) produce evil results, planets in good Shashtiamsas, and which planets are also occupying good vargas or divisions become powerful to confer good results and that planets in exaltation, in friendly signs, own navamsas , own rasis, drekkenas, shodasmsas and trimsamsas possess Sthanabala and exercise the most favourable influence. The same text also states that those planets that are exalted or occupy their moolatrikonas vested with full strength destroy all their good effects in case they happen to occupy cruel shashtiamsas. The lord of the 10th conjoining with the lord of the lagna in the 11th house causes loss of wealth through rulers’ ire if it also happens to be Yamaghantakansha or Danshtrakaralansha (which are cruel and evil shashtiamsas). The lord of the Dhanabhava (2nd house) even if occupying a kendrasthana or a trikonabhava does not confer wealth if it also occupies a cruel shashtiamsa, the person will incur debts; the same results will ensue in case the lord of the navamsa occupied by the lord of the 11th house is in a cruel shashtiamsa. Benefic planets occupying cruel shashtiamsas do not confer good results during the course of their respective dashas or antra-dashas. Afflicted weak natural malefics situated in malefic shashtiamsa produce bad results. If at the time birth Saturn is in its sign of debilitation or in inimical sign or is eclipsed by the Sun and is associated with and aspected by planets and situated in a malefic shashtiamsa one meets a miserable death. Saturn occupying its own sign or exaltation sign does not generally afflict the natural benefics or their yoga-formations, and if not occupying its neecha navamsa (Aries navamsa) or a cruel shashtiamsa confers good results.

== Signification ==
The Birth Chart or Horoscope drawn for the time of birth verily indicates when events are bound to happen, and the Shashtiamsa Chart tells why events happen in the life of the native; both charts complement each other. Jataka Tattva tells us that the lord of the 10th house occupying evil vargas owned by evil planets and situated in cruel shashtiamsa makes one notorious. But, if the lord of the 10th associating with benefics is in the 5th shashtiamsa then he will be an able leader and ruler.
