= Avastha (Hindu astrology) =

Condition of planets in Hindu astrology

Avastha (अवस्था) in Sanskrit means status, state or condition. Hindu astrology has evolved methods for ascertaining the avasthas (states) gained by planets at any given time. Parashara in his Bṛhat Parāśara Horāśāstra refers to six kinds of avasthas.

== Avasthas ==
Avasthas are basically secondary sources of strength which temper interpretations rather than reverse them; for example, a planet in Mritya (Death) avastha and situated in its own or exaltation sign is better than when it is in debilitation. Parashara has made mention of the undernoted varieties of planetary avasthas:

- a) The basic planetary avasthas are Bala, Kumara, Yuva, Vriddha and Mritya. A planet in Bala avastha is of ¼ strength, in Kumara avastha of ½ strength, in Yuva avastha it is of full strength, in Vridhha avastha it is of minimum strength, and in Mritya avastha it gives no result.
- b) A planet is in its Jagrat avastha i.e.Awakening state, when it is in own or exaltation sign, in Swapna avastha or Dreaming state when it is in a friendly or neutral sign, and in Sushupti avastha or Sleeping state when in an inimical or its debilitation sign.
- c) A planet is in Dipita avastha when it is exalted, in Swastha avastha when it is in own sign, in Pramudita avastha when in the sign of its intimate friend, in Shanta avastha when in a friendly sign, in Deena avastha when it is in a neutral sign, in Vikala avastha when it is in a malefic sign, in Khala avastha when in an inimical sign and in Kopa avastha when it is combust (eclipsed by the Sun).
- d) A planet is in Lajjita avastha when placed in the 5th bhava or house it conjoins with Rahu, Ketu, Sun, Saturn or Mars, in Garvita avastha when it occupies its sign of exaltation or its moolatrikona rasi, in Kshudita avastha when it is in its inimical sign or either in conjunction with or aspected by an inimical planet or Saturn, in Trushita avastha when situated a in watery sign is aspected by a malefic only, in Mudita avastha when it is in its friendly sign either aspected by or in conjunction with a benefic or Jupiter, and in Kshobita avastha when it is in conjunction with the Sun or either aspected by or in conjunction with an inimical planet.
- e) The fifth kind of avasthas is ascertained from the Nakshatra occupied by the particular planet, as counted from Ashvini. Those avasthas are Sayana, Upavesana, Netrapani, Prakasana, Gamana, Agamana, Sabha, Agama, Bhojana, Nrityalipsa, Kautuka and Nidra. A benefic in Sayana avastha will give good results at all times but a malefic in Bhojana avastha destroys everything indicated by the house it occupies.
- f) From the states obtained from nakshatra occupation the Dristi avastha when the planet gives ordinary results, the Cheshta avastha when the result is intense and the Vicheshta avastha when minimal result accrues.

All standard Hindu astrology text-books provide the method for ascertaining the afore-mentioned avasthas as also the results of planets found in those avasthas.

== Implication ==
The planet which is in Baala avastha i.e. in odd signs 0-6, in even signs 24-30 degrees gives an ascending rise, in Kumar avastha i.e. in odd signs 6-12, in even signs 18-24 degrees, much better results, in Yuva or taruna avastha i.e. in odd signs 12-18, in even signs 12-18 degrees, gives the strongest or best results, in Proudha avastha i.e. in odd signs 18-24, in even signs 6-12 degrees, it becomes incapable of doing good, and in Vriddha avastha i.e. in odd signs 24-30, in even signs 0-6 degrees it gives very bad results. In Horary astrology there are two kinds of avasthas taken into account, they are 1) according to the neutral, friendly, own, moolatrikona, exaltation, inimical or debilitation sign occupied and 2) Atibaala avastha (infant), a day after combustion, Balya avastha (child), seven days after combustion, Kumara avastha (adolescent), till the planet becomes stationary, Yuva avastha (youth), till the commencement of retrogression, Bhupa avastha (royal), for period of retrogression, Vriddha avastha (servile), a few days before combustion, and Mritya avastha (death), when the planet is combust or eclipsed. The former is Sthana avastha or the positional state and the latter the Kala avastha or the temporal state.

Hindu astrology also refers to eleven more avasthas or moods which are Pradipta (blazing) when the planet is in exaltation sign, Sukhita (happy), in its moolatrikona rasi, Svastha (well), when in own sign, Mudita or Harishita (delighted), when in its friendly sign, Shanta (tranquil), when it is in the Varga varga of a benefic planet, Sakta (capable), when it is possessing brilliant rays, Nipidita (tortured), defeated in graham-yuddha, Khala (base), when it is in varga of a malefic, Suduhkhita (exceedingly distressed), in inimical sign, Atibhita (greatly frightened), in its debilitation sign and Vikala (infirm), when it is eclipsed. The effects of these avasthas will be corresponding to their appellations.
