= Arundhati (epic) =

Hindi epic poem by Rambhadracharya

अरुन्धती महाकाव्य
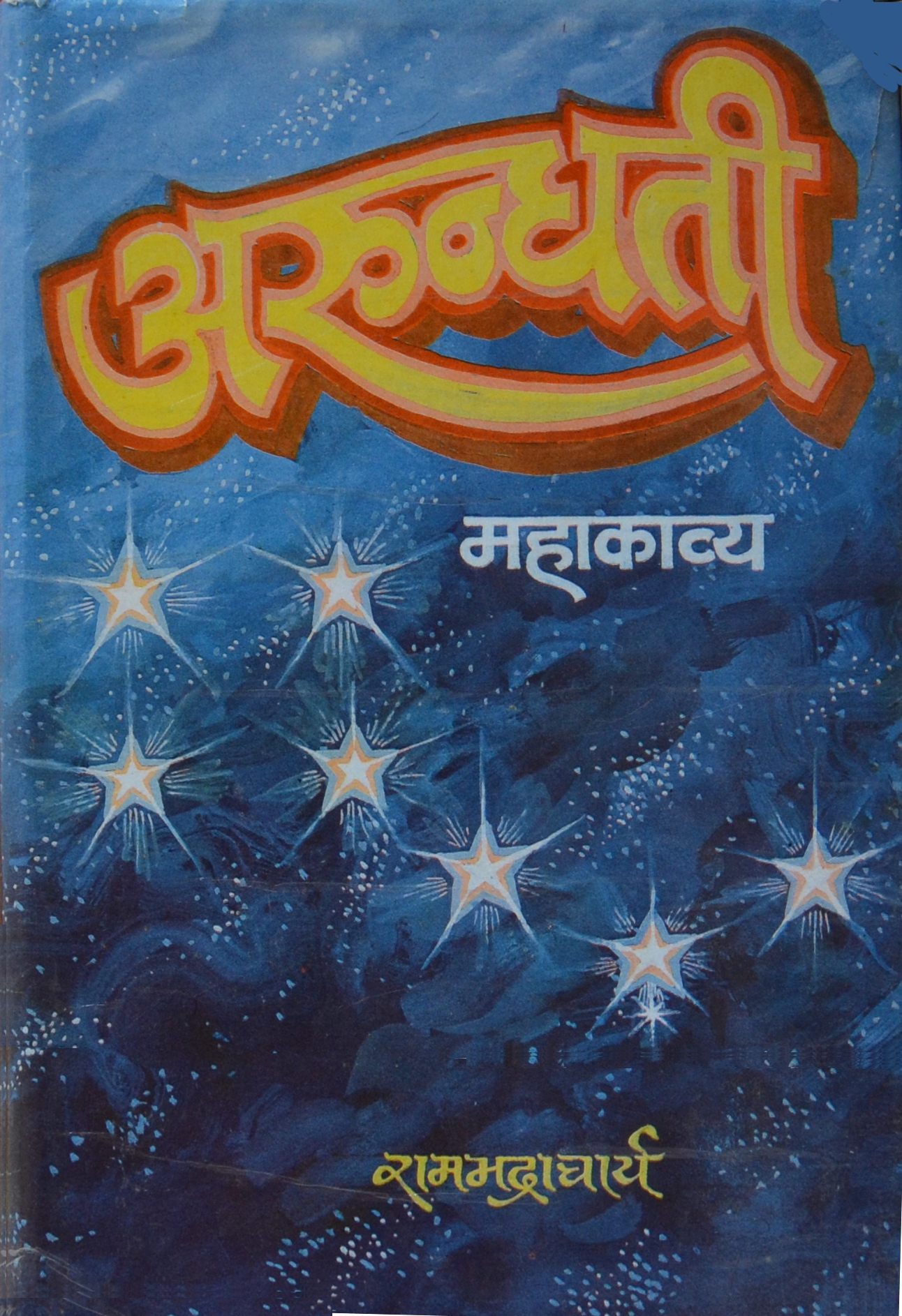
- Cover page of Arundhati (epic), first edition, showing the Saptarṣi as the Big Dipper asterism
- Author: Jagadguru Rambhadracharya
- Original title: Arundhatī (Epic Poem)
- Language: Hindi
- Genre: Epic Poetry
- Publisher: Shri Raghav Sahitya Prakashan Nidhi, Haridvar
- Publication date: 1994
- Publication place: India
- Media type: Print (hardcover)
- Pages: 232 pp (first edition)

Arundhatī (Hindi: अरुन्धती) (1994) is a Hindi epic poem (Mahakavya) composed by Jagadguru Rambhadracharya (1950–) in the year 1994. It consists of 1279 verses in 15 cantos (sargas). The poem presents the narrative of the couple Arundhatī and Vasiṣṭha which is found in various Hindu scriptures. As per the poet, the narration of the epic is directly related to the psychological evolution of humans. A copy of the epic was published in 1994 by the Shri Raghav Sahitya Prakashan Nidhi, Haridwar, Uttar Pradesh. The book was released by the then President of India, Shankar Dayal Sharma on July 7, 1994.

== Composition ==
In the prologue of the work, the poet mentions why he chose Arundhatī as the subject of his first ever epic poem composed in Khadi Boli, the standard dialect of Hindi. He mentions that his reverence for Arundhatī is natural as he was born in a family of Vaśiṣṭha Gotra. He found the character of Arundhatī – “which has invaluable elements of the Indian culture, society, righteousness, nation and Vedic philosophy” – to be unblemished, inspiring and worthy of imitation. He further says that the practice of Agnihotra was substantially promoted and furthered by Arundhatī and Vasiṣṭha only, and that along with the seven sages (the Saptarṣi), only the wife of Vasiṣṭha is worshipped, and no other seer's wife is accorded this honour.

== Narrative ==
=== Sources ===
Most of the narrative of the epic can be found in various Hindu scriptures. Some portions are the original compositions of the poet. The birth of Arundhatī is found in the Śiva Purāṇa and Śrīmadbhāgavata, but the epic describes the birth as per Śrīmadbhāgavata. The instruction by Brahmā to Arundhatī is taken from the Uttarakāṇḍa of the Ramcharitmanas. The animosity between Viśvāmitra and Vasiṣṭha is based on the Bālakāṇḍa of Vālmīki's Rāmāyaṇa. The birth of Śakti and Parāśara is found in the Mahābhārata and several Brāhmaṇa works. The final events in the epic are based on the narrative of Valmiki's Rāmāyaṇa, Rāmacaritamānasa and Vinayapatrikā.

=== Synopsis ===
Arundhatī is the eighth daughter of Ṛṣi Kardama and Devahūti, and is married to Vasiṣṭha, the eighth son of Brahmā. Brahmā assures the couple that they will have the Darśana (sight) of Rāma. The couple spends many years waiting for Rāma. Viśvaratha, the son of the king Gādhi, tries snatch celestial cow Kāmadhenu from Vasiṣṭha, but is unable to stand against the Brahmadaṇḍa of Vasiṣṭha. Viśvaratha undergoes penance and becomes the Ṛṣi Viśvāmitra. The revengeful Viśvāmitra curses all hundred sons of Arundhatī and Vasiṣṭha to die. The forgiveness of the couple gives rise to a son Śakti, whom Viśvāmitra gets killed by a demon. Arundhatī and Vasiṣṭha then head for Vānaprastha Āśrama, leaving their grandson Parāśara to look after their hermitage. Brahmā ordains them to re-enter Gārhasthya Āśrama, reassuring that they will have the Darśana of Rāma as a householder couple only. The couple starts living in an Āśrama near Ayodhyā. With the birth of Rāma, a son named Suyajña is born to them. Rāma and Suyajña study together in the Āśrama of Arundhatī and Vasiṣṭha. After the marriage of Sītā and Rāma in Mithilā, Arundhatī meets Sītā for the first time when the newly-wed couple arrives in Ayodhyā. Sītā and Rāma spend fourteen years in exile. When they return home, they have their first meal after the exile which is prepared by Arundhatī, and the epic ends thereafter.

=== The fifteen cantos ===
1. Sṛṣṭi (Hindi: सृष्टि, meaning Creation):
2. Praṇaya (Hindi: प्रणय, meaning Adulation):
3. Prīti (Hindi: प्रीति, meaning Affection):
4. Paritoṣa (Hindi: परितोष, meaning Satisfaction):
5. Pratīkṣā (Hindi: प्रतीक्षा, meaning Expectation):
6. Anunaya (Hindi: अनुनय, meaning Supplication):
7. Pratiśodha (Hindi: प्रतिशोध, meaning Retribution):
8. Kṣamā (Hindi: क्षमा, meaning Exculpation):
9. Śakti (Hindi: शक्ति, meaning Qualification):
10. Uparāma (Hindi: उपराम, meaning Cessation):
11. Prabodha (Hindi: प्रबोध, meaning Cognition):
12. Bhakti (Hindi: भक्ति, meaning Devotion):
13. Upalabdhi (Hindi: उपलब्धि, meaning Acquisition):
14. Utkaṇṭhā (Hindi: उत्कण्ठा, meaning Anticipation):
15. Pramoda (Hindi: प्रमोद, meaning Elation):
