= Dendera zodiac =

Bas relief sculptured Zodiac from an Osirian chapel

Coordinates: 26°8′30″N 32°40′13″E

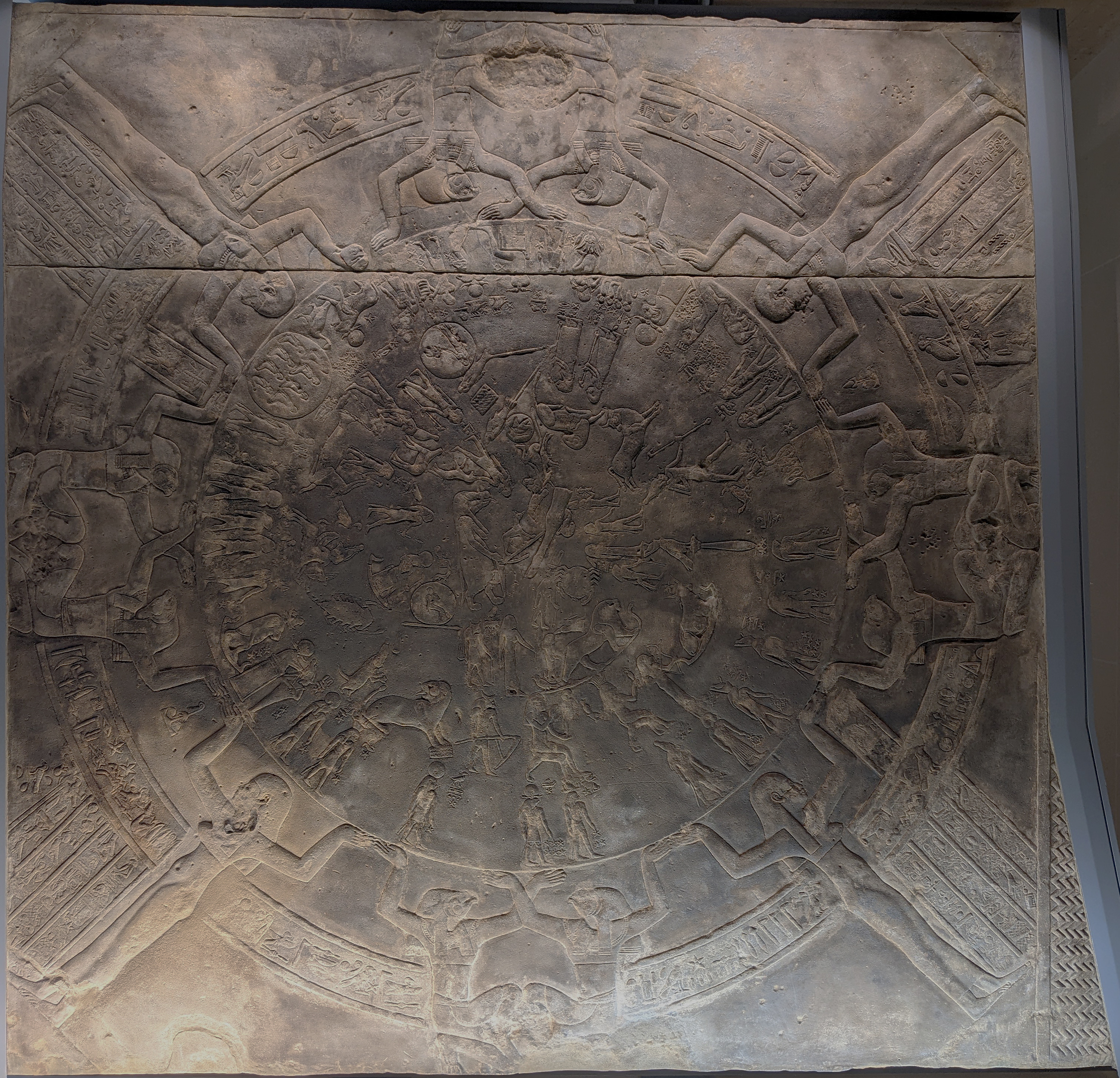
The Dendera zodiac as displayed at the Louvre

The sculptured Dendera zodiac (or Denderah zodiac) is a widely known Egyptian bas-relief from the ceiling of the pronaos (or portico) of a chapel dedicated to Osiris in the Hathor temple at Dendera, containing images of Taurus (the bull) and Libra (the scales). This chapel was begun in the late Ptolemaic period; its pronaos was added by the emperor Tiberius. This led Jean-François Champollion to date the relief to the Greco-Roman period, but most of his contemporaries believed it to be of the New Kingdom.

The relief, which John H. Rogers characterised as "the only complete map that we have of an ancient sky", has been conjectured in the past to represent the basis on which later astronomy systems were based. It is now on display at the Musée du Louvre, Paris.

== Description ==
The sky disc is centered on the north pole star, with Ursa Minor depicted as a jackal. An inner disc is composed of constellations showing the signs of the zodiac. (Note: The zodiac is a planisphere or map of the stars on a plane projection, showing the 12 constellations of the zodiacal band forming 36 decans of ten days each, and the planets. These decans are groups of first-magnitude stars. These were used in the ancient Egyptian calendar, which was based on lunar cycles of around 30 days and on the heliacal rising of the star Sothis (Sirius).) Some of these are represented in the same Greco-Roman iconographic forms as their familiar counterparts (e.g. the Ram, Taurus, Scorpio, and Capricorn), (Note: Albeit most in odd orientations in comparison to the conventions of ancient Greece, as shown for instance in the Almagest and later Arabic-Western developments) whilst others are shown in a more Egyptian form: Aquarius is represented as the flood god Hapi, holding two vases which gush water. Rogers noted the similarities of unfamiliar iconology with the three surviving tablets of a Seleucid zodiac and both relating to kudurru ('boundary stone') representations: in short, Rogers sees the Dendera zodiac as "a complete copy of the Mesopotamian zodiac". A comparison with other Mesopotamian pre-zodiac astronomical material led Hoffmann to the suggestion that the depiction shows a Babylonian star chart (and not only the Babylonian zodiac) with some Greco-Egyptian additions and variants.

Four women and four pairs of falcon-headed figures, arranged 45° from one another, hold up the sky disc, the outermost ring of which features 36 figures representing the 36 asterisms used to track both the 36 forty-minute "hours" that divided the Egyptian night, as well as the 36 ten-day "weeks" (decans) of the Egyptian year (with 5 days excluded). The square of the overall sculpture is oriented to the walls of the temple.

This sculptural representation of the zodiac in circular form is unique in ancient Egyptian art. More typical are the rectangular zodiacs which decorate the same temple's pronaos.

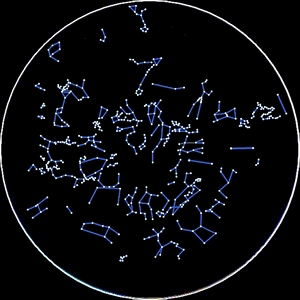
Zodiaque de Denderah with the 48 constellations of Claudius Ptolemaus clearly identified among the present 72 constellations on this Zodiac.

== History ==
During the Napoleonic campaign in Egypt, Vivant Denon drew the circular zodiac, the more widely known one, and the rectangular zodiacs. In 1802, after the Napoleonic expedition, Denon published engravings of the temple ceiling in his Voyage dans la Basse et la Haute Egypte. These elicited a controversy as to the age of the zodiac representation, ranging from tens of thousands to a thousand years to a few hundred, and whether the zodiac was a planisphere or an astrological chart. Sébastien Louis Saulnier, an antique dealer, commissioned Claude Lelorrain to remove the circular zodiac with saws, jacks, scissors and gunpowder. The zodiac ceiling was moved in 1821 to Restoration Paris and, by 1822, was installed by Louis XVIII in the Royal Library (later called the National Library of France). In 1922 the zodiac was moved from there to the Louvre. In 2022 Egyptologist Zahi Hawass started a petition to bring the ancient work back to Egypt, along with the Rosetta Stone and other artifacts.

=== Dating ===
As of October 12, 2026, the dating given by the Louvre is 50 BC.

The controversy around the zodiac's dating, known as the "Dendera Affair", involved people of the likes of Joseph Fourier (who estimated that the age was 2500 BC). Champollion, among others, believed that it was a religious zodiac. Champollion placed the zodiac in the fourth century AD. Georges Cuvier placed the date between 123 AD and 147 AD. His discussion of the dating summarizes the reasoning as he understood it in the 1820s.

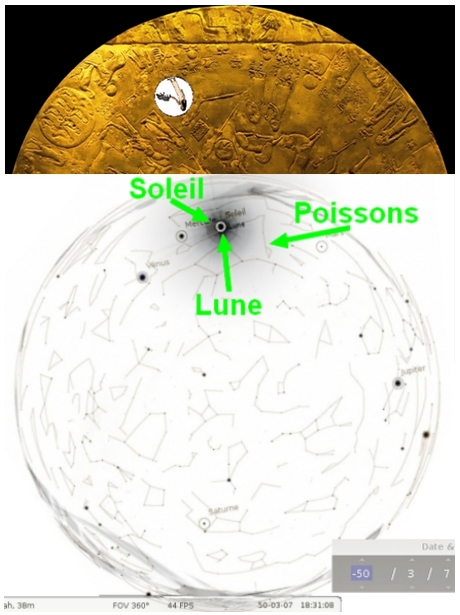
Solar eclipse on 7 March 51 BC

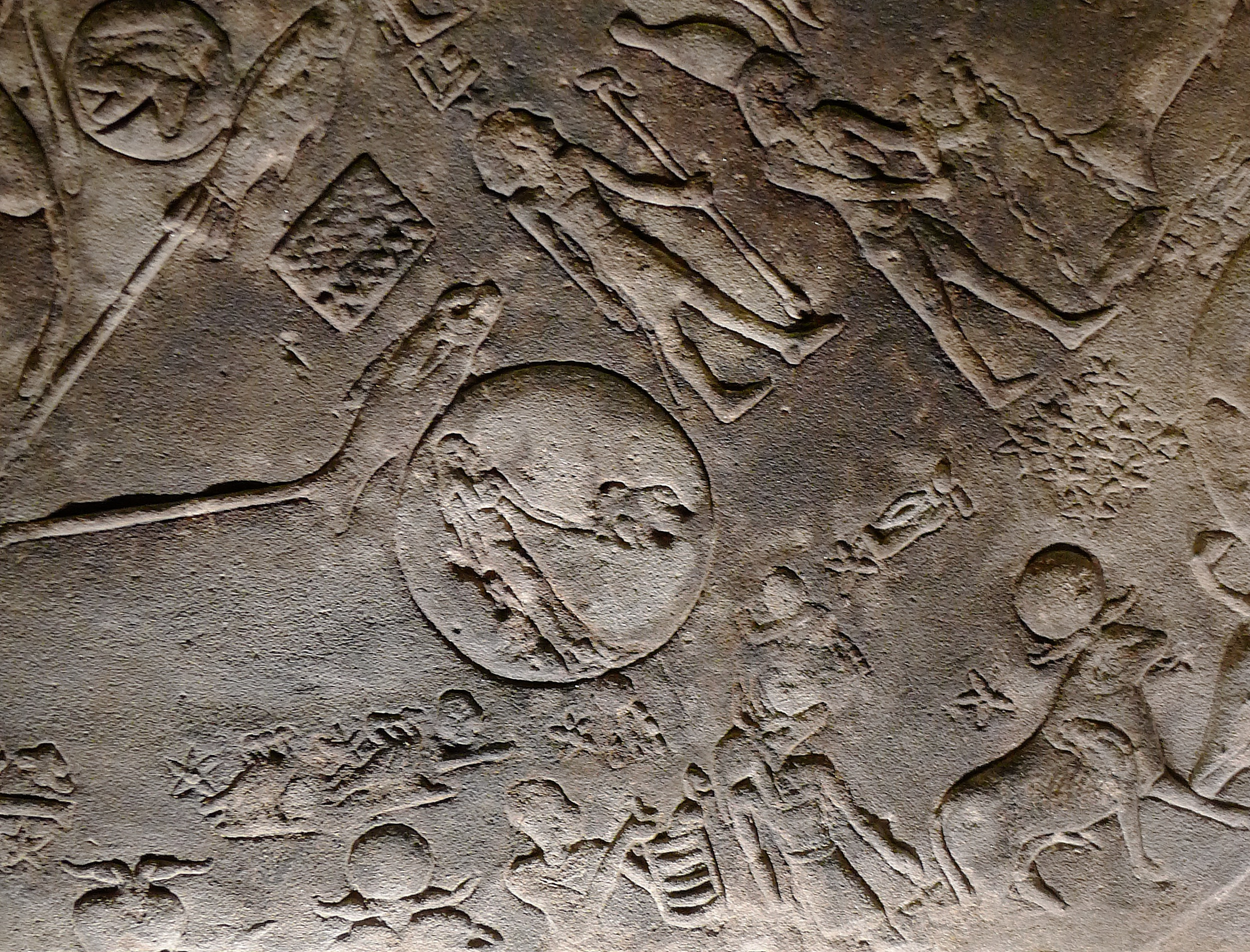
Goddess Isis holding a baboon (the god Thoth) by the tail.

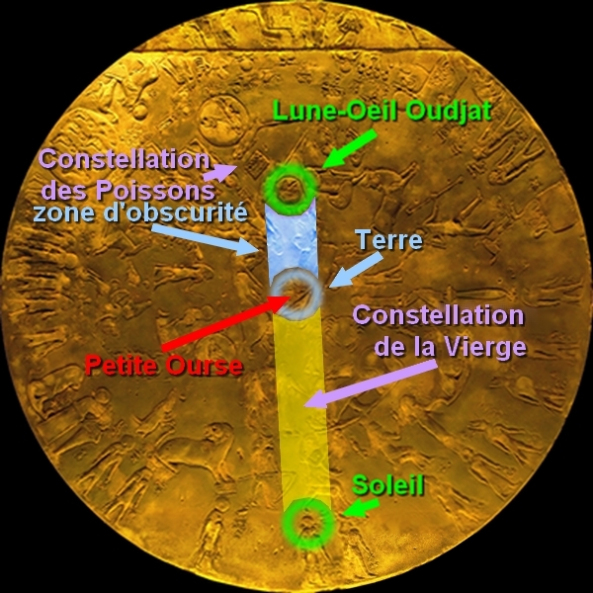
Lunar eclipse on 25 September 52 BC

Sylvie Cauville and Éric Aubourg dated it to 50 BC through an examination of the planetary configuration. It depicts the five planets known to the Egyptians, in a configuration that occurs once every thousand years, and the identification of two eclipses. The solar eclipse indicates the date of March 7, 51 BC: it is represented by a circle containing the goddess Isis holding a baboon (the god Thoth) by the tail. The lunar eclipse indicates the date of September 25, 52 BC: it is represented by an Eye of Horus locked into a circle.

== See also ==
- Athribis (Upper Egypt)
- Astronomical ceiling of Senenmut's Tomb
- Farnese Atlas - a 2nd-century AD Roman marble sculpture of Atlas holding up a celestial globe
- Zodiac mosaics in ancient synagogues
