= Decan =

Groups of stars in Ancient Egyptian astronomy

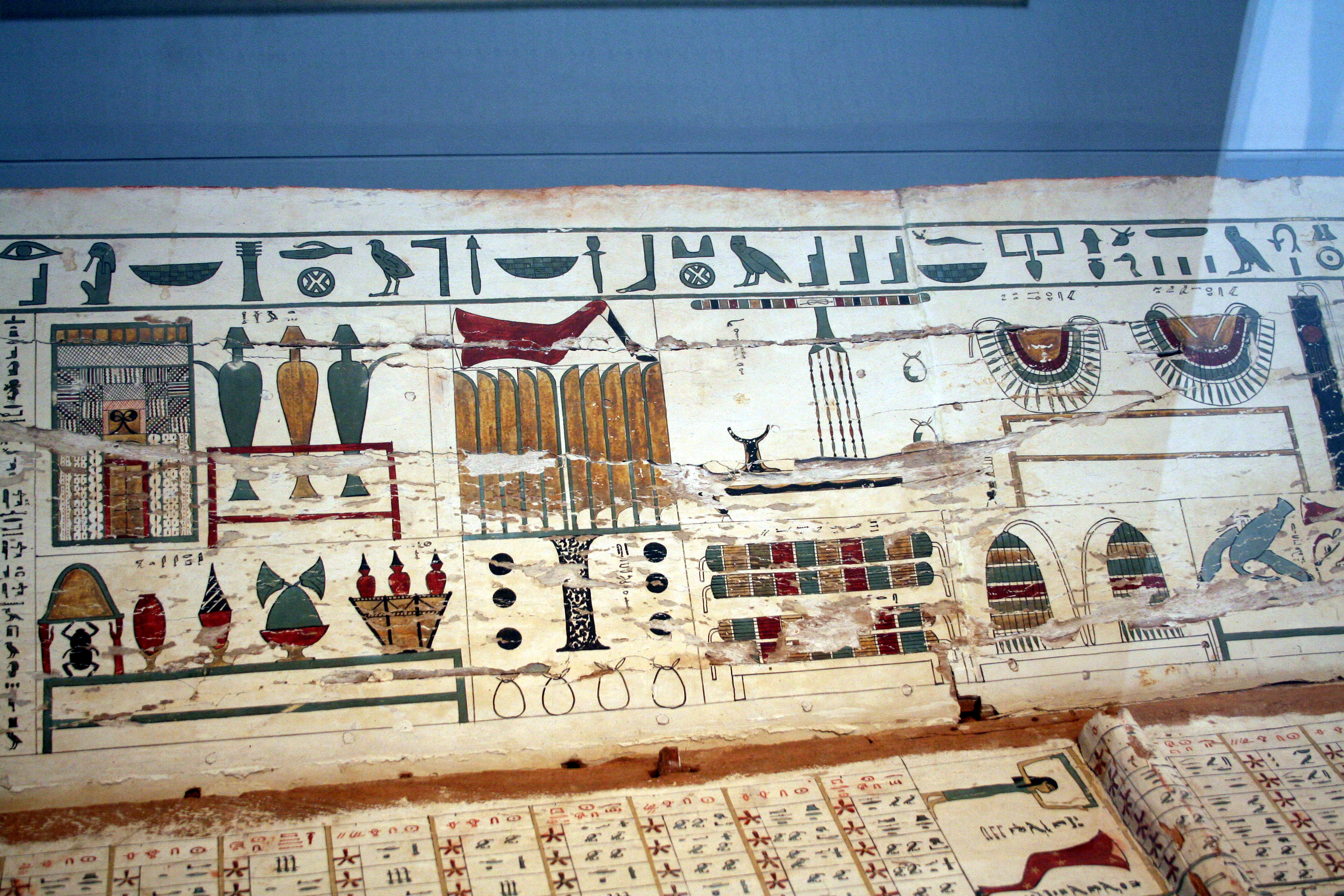
'Diagonal star table' from the late Eleventh Dynasty coffin lid; found at Asyut, Egypt. Roemer- und Pelizaeus-Museum Hildesheim

The decans (/ˈdɛkənz/; Ancient Egyptian: 𓅡𓎡𓏏𓁐𓅱𓏼, romanized: bꜣkt.w, lit. '[those] connected with work') are 36 groups of stars (small constellations) used in ancient Egyptian astronomy to conveniently divide the 360 degree ecliptic into 36 parts of 10 degrees each, both for theurgical and heliacal chronometrical purposes. The decans each appeared, geocentrically, to rise consecutively on the horizon throughout each daily Earth rotation. The rising of each decan marked the beginning of a new decanal "hour" (Greek hōra) of the night for the ancient Egyptians, and they were used as a nocturnal (sidereal clock) beginning by at least the Ninth or Tenth Dynasty of Egypt in the 21st century BC.

Because a new decan also appears heliacally every ten days (that is, every ten days, a new decanic star group reappears in the eastern sky at dawn right before the Sun rises, after a period of being obscured by the Sun's light), the Greeks called them dekanói (Koine Greek: δεκανοί; pl. of δεκανός dekanós) or "tenths".

Decans gave way to a lunar division of 27 or 28 lunar stations, also known as manzil (Arabic: مَنْزِل), lunar stations, or nakshatras and thence to a zodiac of twelve signs, based on an anthropomorphic pattern of constellations, and their use can be seen in the Dendera zodiac dated to circa 50 BCE.

== Ancient Egyptian origins ==
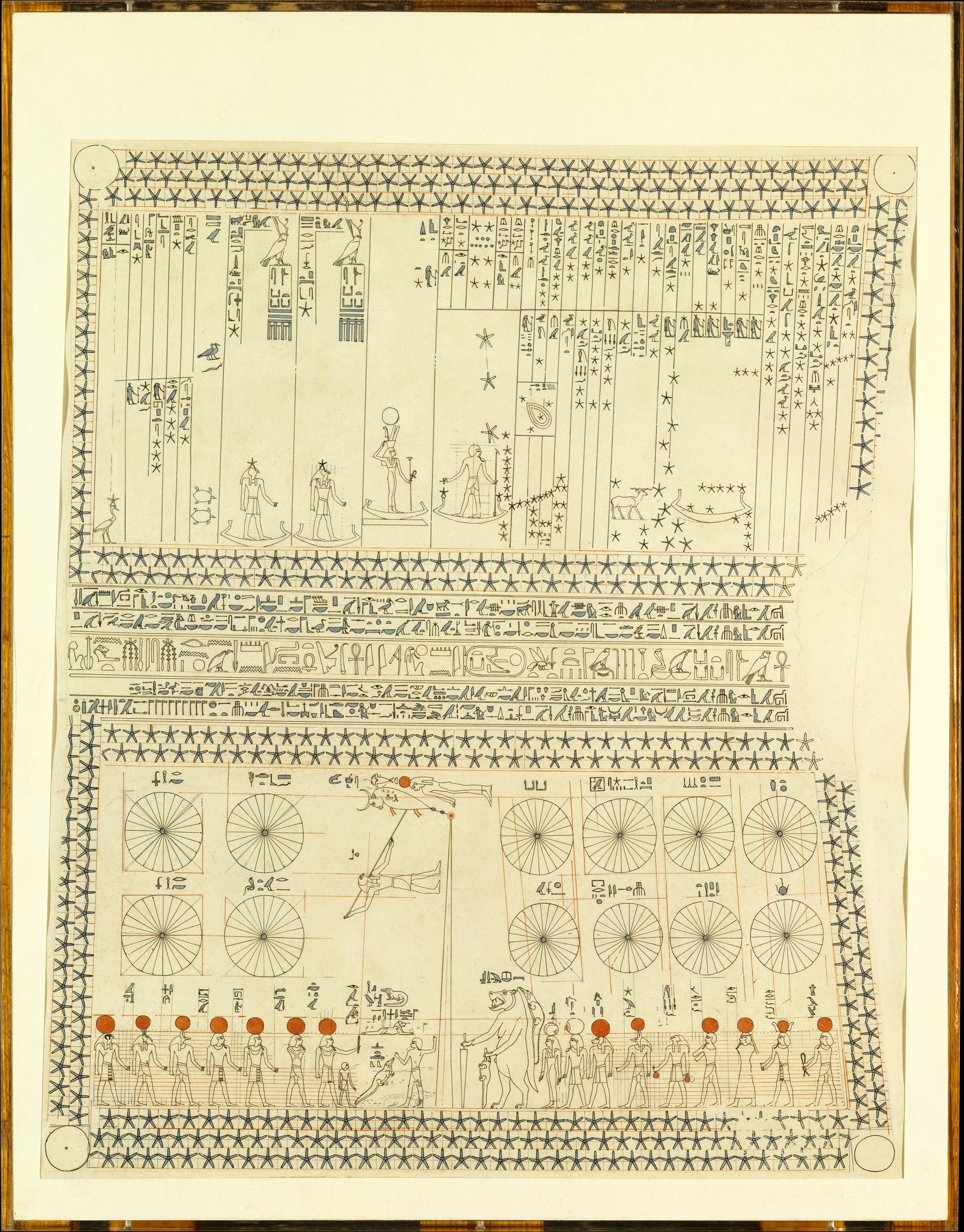
Astronomical ceiling of Senemut Tomb showing various decans, as well as the personified representations of stars and constellations

Decans first appeared in the First Intermediate Period of Egypt on coffin lids. The sequence of these star patterns began with Sirius ("Sothis"), and each decan contained a set of stars and corresponding divinities. As measures of time, the rising and setting of decans marked 'hours' and groups of ten days, which comprised an Egyptian year. The Book of Nut covers the subject of the decans.

There were 36 decans (36 × 10 = 360 days), plus five added days to compose the 365 days of a solar-based year. Decans measure sidereal time and the solar year is six hours longer; the Sothic and solar years in the Egyptian calendar realign every 1460 years. Decans represented on coffins from later dynasties, such as Pharaoh Seti I (d. 1279 BCE), compared with earlier decan images, demonstrate the Sothic cycle shift.

According to Sarah Symons,

Although we know the names of the decans, and in some cases can translate the names (ḥry-ỉb wỉꜣ means 'in the centre of the boat') the locations of the decanal stars and their relationships to modern star names and constellations are not known. This is due to many factors, but key problems are the uncertainty surrounding the observation methods used to develop and populate the diagonal star tables, and the criteria used to select decans (brightness, position, relationship with other stars, and so on).

== Later developments ==
These predictable heliacal re-appearances by the decans were eventually used by the Egyptians to mark the divisions of their annual solar calendar. Thus the heliacal rising of Sirius marked the annual flooding of the Nile.

This method led to a system of 12 daytime hours and 12 nighttime hours, varying in length according to the season. Later, a system of 24 "equinoctial" hours was used. After Hellenistic astrology arose in Alexandria, recorded principally in the work of Ptolemy and Vettius Valens, various systems attributing symbolic significance to decans arose and linked these to the classical planets: the "wandering stars" Mercury, Venus, Mars, Jupiter and Saturn and the "lights", the sun and moon. Decans were connected, for example, with the winds, the cardinal directions, the sect (day or night) male and female, as well as the four humours (elements;) also these were hermetically considered linked with various diseases and with the timing for the engraving of talismans for curing them; with decanic "faces" (or "phases"), a system where three decans are assigned to each zodiacal sign, each covering 10° of the zodiac, and each ruled by a planetary ruler (see Decan (astrology)); and correlated with astrological signs.

== Descriptions of the decans ==
Decans are named in various Greco-Egyptian sources, many Hermetic writings, the Testament of Solomon, the Tabula Aristobuli (Codex Palatinus Latinus 1367) attributed to Aristobulus of Paneas, and the writings of Julius Firmicus Maternus, Cosmas of Maiuma, Joseph Justus Scaliger, and Athanasius Kircher.

Images of the decans are described in Hermetic writings, by the Indian astrologer Varāhamihira, in the Picatrix, and in Japanese writings. Varāhamihira's images of the decans was influenced by Greco-Egyptian, if not Hermetic, depictions of the decans by way of the Yavanajataka. Their role in Japanese astrology may have derived from an earlier Chinese or Indian form possibly from adding the twelve animals of the Chinese zodiac to a list of twenty-four hour stars. They were most common between the Kamakura and Edo periods.

The first original decan position due to the precession in ancient times started at 0° of Cancer when the heliacal rising of Sirius (Egyptian Sepdet; Greco-Egyptian: Sothis) before sunrise marking the Egyptian New Year which fell at 0° of Leo at July 20 in the Julian calendar, that is July 22/23 on the Gregorian calendar.

Names of the Decans
Western Zodiac	Decan	Original Decan Position due to the Precession in Ancient Times	Ancient Egyptian (Budge)	Greco-Egyptian	Testament of Solomon	Aristobulus's names	Greek Hermeticism	Latin Hermeticism	Firmicus	Cosmas	Scalinger	Kircher
Aries	1	28	W17 Xr r w sbA Khent-kheru	W17 pt sbA ⲭⲟⲛⲧⲁⲣⲉ Χont-har	Rhyax or Ruax	Bendonc	Chenlachori	Aulathamas	Senator or Asiccan	Aidoneus	Asiccan	Arueris (ⲁⲣⲟⲩⲉⲣⲓⲥ)
Aries	2	29	P11 d nw sbA Qeṭ	W17 Xr r sbA ⲭⲟⲛⲧⲁⲭⲣⲉ Xont-χre	Barsafael	Mensour	Chontaret	Sabaoth	Senacher or Asenter	Persephone	Senacher	Anubis (ⲁⲛⲟⲩⲃ)
Aries	3	30	zA zA P11 d nw sbA sbA sbA sbA sbA Sasaqeṭ	zA P11 sbA ⲥⲓⲕⲉⲧ Si-ket	Artosael or Arôtosael	Carexon	Siket	Disornafais	Sentacher or Asentacer	Eros	Acentacer	Horus (ⲱⲣⲟⲥ)
Taurus	4	31	a&r&t sbA sbA Ārt	xA w sbA ⲭⲱⲟⲩ Xau	Horopel	Gisan	Soou	Jaus	Suo or Asicat	Charis	Asicath	Serapis (ⲥⲉⲣⲁⲡⲓⲥ)
Taurus	5	32	xA xA xA sbA Khau	a r i t sbA ⲉⲣⲱ, ⲁⲣⲟⲩ Arat	Kairoxanondalon or Iudal	Tourtour	Aron	Sarnotois	Aryo or Ason	die Horen	Viroaso	Helitomenos (ⲉⲗⲓⲧⲟⲙⲉⲛⲟⲥ)
Taurus	6	33	D41 n Hr r w O28 Z1 D63 Z1 sbA Remen-ḥeru-an-Saḥ	D41 pt sbA ⲣⲉⲙⲉⲛⲁⲁⲣⲉ Remen-hare	Sphendonael	Ballat	Rhomenos	Erchmubris	Romanae or Arfa	Litai	Aharph	Apopis (ⲁⲡⲱⲡⲓⲥ)
Gemini	7	34	ms s M36 F21 D63 sbA Mestcher-Saḥ	S24 z V12 sbA ⲑⲟⲥⲟⲗⲕ Θosalk	Sphandor	Farsan	Xocha	Manuchos	Thesogar or Tensogar	Thetys	Thesogar	Tautus (ⲧⲟⲟⲩⲑ)
Gemini	8	35	D41 n Xr r D63 sbA Remen-kher-Saḥ	Z7 a r t sbA ⲟⲩⲁⲣⲉ Uaret	Belbel	Vaspan	Ouari	Samurois	Ver or Asuae	Kybele	Verasua	Cyclops (ⲕⲟⲩⲕⲗⲟⲯ)
Gemini	9	36	a Z1 D63 sbA A-Saḥ	tp a D63 M44 t sbA; Phu-hor	Kourtael or Kurtaêl	Parquia	Pepisoth	Azuel	Tepis or Atosoae	Praxidike	Tepisatosoa	Titan (ⲧⲓⲧⲁⲛ)
		37	D63 sbA Saḥ									
Cancer	10	1 (= 0' Cancer)	M44 t sbA Sepṭet	ⲥⲱⲑⲓⲥ Sopdet	Metathiax	Panem	Sotheir	Seneptois	Sothis or Socius	Nike	Sothis	Apollun (ⲁⲡⲟⲗⲗⲟⲩⲛ)
Cancer	11	2	tp a k n mwt t sbA Ṭepā-Kenmut	S tA I2 ⲥⲓⲧ Seta	Katanikotael	Catarno	Ouphisit	Somachalmais	Sith	Herakles	Syth	Hecate (ⲉⲕⲁⲧⲏ)
Cancer	12	3	k S3 mwt t sbA Kenmut	k n sbA ⲭⲛⲟⲩⲙⲓⲥ Knum	Saphthorael or Saphathoraél	Hellors	Chnouphos	Charmine	Thiumis or Thumus	Hekate	Thuimis	Mercophta (ⲙⲉⲣⲕⲟⲫϯ)
Leo	13	4	Xr r k n mwt t sbA Kher-khept-Kenmut	Xr r x t p y k n Aa15 sbA ⲭⲁⲣⲭⲛⲟⲩⲙⲓⲥ Χar-Knum	Phobothel or Bobêl	Jarea	Chnoumos	Zaloias	Craumonis or Afruicois	Hephaistos	Aphruimis	Typhon (ⲧⲟⲩⲫⲱⲉⲟⲩⲥ)
Leo	14	5	HAt DA t sbA Ḥā-tchat	HAt DA sbA ⲏⲧⲏⲧ Ha-tet	Leroel or Kumeatêl	Effraa	Ipi	Zachor	Sic	Isis	Sithacer	Peroeus (ⲡⲉⲣⲟⲉⲟⲩⲥ)
Leo	15	6	pH y DA t sbA Peḥui-tchat	pH y DA sbA ⲫⲟⲩⲧⲏⲧ Phu-Tet	Soubetti	Hayas	Phatiti	Frich	Futile or Eisie	Sarapis	Phuonisie	Nephthe (ⲛⲉⲫⲑⲏ)
Virgo	16	7	T mA t Hr r t sbA Themat-ḥert	t mA sbA ⲧⲱⲙ Tom	Katrax or Atrax	Angaf	Athoum	Zamendres	Thumis or Thinnis	Themis	Thumi	Isis (ⲓⲥⲓⲥ)
Virgo	17	8	T mA t Xr r t sbA Themat-khert	Z7 M8 U33 bA kA sbA ⲟⲩⲉⲥⲧⲉ—ⲃⲓⲕⲱⲧⲓ Uste-bikot	Jeropa or Ieropaêl	Bethapen	Brysous	Magois	Tophicus or Tropicus	Moirai	Thopitus	Piosiris (ⲡⲓⲟⲥⲓⲣⲓⲥ)
Virgo	18	9	G42 U33 i sbA Usthȧ	i p z t sbA ⲁⲫⲟⲥⲟ Aposot	Modobel or Buldumêch	Baroche	Amphatham	Michulais	Afut or Asuth	Hestia	Aphut	Cronus (ⲕⲣⲟⲛⲟⲥ)
Libra	19	10	B2 U33 i sbA Bekathȧ	s b X z sbA ⲥⲟⲩⲭⲱⲥ Sob‿χos	Madero or Naôth	Zercuris	Sphoukou	Psineus	Seuichut or Senichut	Erinys	Serucuth	Zeuda (ⲍⲉⲟⲩⲇⲁ)
Libra	20	11	tp a W17 t t sbA Ṭepā-khentet	tp Z1 a Z1 W17 sbA ⲧⲡⲏⲭⲟⲛⲧⲓ Tpa-χont	Nathotho or Marderô	Baham	Nephthimes	Chusthisis	Sepisent or Atebenus	Kairos	Aterechinis	Omphta (ⲟⲙⲫϯ)
Libra	21	12	W17 t t Hr r t Khentet-ḥert	W17 pt sbA ⲭⲟⲛⲧⲁⲣⲉ Xont-har	Alath	Pieret	Phou	Psamiatois	Senta or Atepiten	Loimos	Arpien	Ophionius (ⲟⲫⲓⲟⲛⲓⲟⲥ)
Scorpio	22	13	W17 t t Xr r t sbA Khentet-khert	W17 Xr sbA ⲭⲟⲛⲧⲁⲭⲣⲉ Spt-χne	Audameoth	Haziza	Name	Necbeuos	Sentacer or Asente	Nymphs	Sentacer	Arimanius (ⲁⲣⲓⲙⲁⲛⲓⲟⲥ)
Scorpio	23	14	T Y4 s n W17 t t sbA Themes-en-khentet	T ms s n W17 sbA . . . . . . Sesme	Nefthada	Nacy	Oustichos	Turmantis	Tepsisen or Asentatir	Leto	Tepiseuth	Merota (ⲙⲉⲣⲱϯ)
Scorpio	24	15	Aa18 p t x n nw N21 N21 sbA Sapt-khennu	s p t x n T19 sbA ⲥⲡⲧⲭⲛⲉ Si-sesme	Akton	Alleinac	Aphebis	Psermes	Sentineu or Aterceni(-cem)	Kairos (repeated)	Senicer	Panotragus (ⲡⲁⲛⲟⲧⲣⲁⲅⲟⲥ)
Sagittarius	25	16	Hr Z1 ib P1 sbA Ḥer-ab-uȧa	Hr Z1 ib P1 sbA ʿⲣⲏⲟⲩⲱ Hre-ua	Anatreth	Ortusa	Sebos	Clinothois	Eregbuo or Ergbuo	Loimos (repeated)	Eregbuo	Tolmophta (ⲧⲟⲗⲙⲟⲫϯ)
Sagittarius	26	17	P6 W8 W10 V17 Ba16 S s m w sbA Ba16a Shesmu	z S mw sbA ⲥⲉⲥⲙⲉ, ⲥⲓⲥⲉⲥⲙⲉ Sesme	Enautha or Enenuth	Daha	Teuchmos	Thursois	Sagon	Kore	Sagen	Tomras (ⲧⲟⲙⲣⲁⲥ)
Sagittarius	27	18	k n m w sbA Kenmu	k n Aa15 sbA ⲕⲟⲛⲓⲙⲉ Konime	Axesbyth or Phêth	Satan	Chthisar	Renethis	Chenene or Chenem	Ananke	Chenen	Teraph (ⲧⲉⲣⲁⲫ)
Capricorn	28	19	s m d t sbA Semṭet	s Aa15 t sbA ⲥⲙⲁⲧ Smat	Hapax or Harpax	Eracto	Tair	Renpsois	Themeso	Asklepios	Themeso	Soda (ⲥⲱⲇⲁ)
Capricorn	29	20	tp a s m d sbA Ṭepā-semṭ	tp a s Aa15 t sbA . . . . . . . . Srat	Anoster	Salac	Epitek	Manethois	Epiemu or Epimen	Hygieia	Epima	Riruphta (ⲣⲓⲣⲟⲩⲫϯ)
Capricorn	30	21	z r t E11 sbA Sert	z r t sbA ⲥⲣⲱ Si-srat	Physikoreth or Alleborith	Seros	Epichnaus	Marcois	Omot	Tolma	Homoth	Monuphta (ⲙⲟⲛⲟⲩⲫϯ)
Aquarius	31	22	zA zA z r t sbA Sasa-sert	zA z r t sbA ⲥⲓⲥⲣⲱ Tpa-χu	Aleureth or Hephesimireth	Tonghel	Isi	Ularis	Oro or Asoer	Dike	Oroasoer	Brondeus (ⲃⲣⲟⲛⲇⲉⲟⲩⲥ)
Aquarius	32	23	Xr r z r t sbA Kher-khept-sert	Xr r x p t z r sbA . . . . . . . . Xu	Ichthion	Anafa	Sosomo	Luxois	Cratero or Astiro	Phobos	Astiro	Vucula (ⲃⲟⲩⲕⲟⲩⲗⲁ)
Aquarius	33	24	Ax Ax sbA Khukhu	tp a N8 sbA ⲧⲡⲏⲭⲩ Tpa-Biu	Achoneoth or Agchoniôn	Simos	Chonoumous	Crauxes	Tepis or Amasiero	Osiris	Tepisatras	Proteus (ⲡⲣⲟⲧⲉⲟⲩⲥ)
Pisces	34	25	bA bA Baba	N8 w ra sbA ⲭⲩ Biu	Autoth or Autothith	Achaf	Tetimo	Fambais	Acha or Atapiac	Okeanos	Archatapias	Rephan (ⲣⲉⲫⲁⲛ)
Pisces	35	26	W17 Hr r w sbA Khent-ḥeru	tp a G30 sbA ⲧⲡⲏⲃⲓⲟⲩ Xont-Har	Phtheneoth or Phthenoth	Larvata	Sopphi	Flugmois	Tepibui or Tepabiu	Dolus	Thopibui	Sourut (ⲥⲟⲟⲩⲣⲟⲩⲧ)
Pisces	36	27	Hr Z1 ib W17 n t w sbA Ḥer-ȧb-khentu	[[ G30 Z3 sbA ]] ⲃⲓⲟⲩ, ⲧⲡⲓⲃⲓⲟⲩ Tpi-biu	Bianakith	Ajaras	Syro	Piatris	Uiu or Aatexbui	Elpis	Atembui	Phallophorus (ⲫⲁⲗⲗⲟⲫⲟⲣⲟⲥ)

== Ancient India ==
In India, the division of the zodiac into 36 ten degree portions is called either the drekkana (drekkāṇa), the dreshkana (dreṣkāṇa), or the drikana (dṛkāṇa).

The iconography and use of the drekkanas is mentioned earliest by Sphujidhvaja in Yavanajataka (269–270 CE), and given detailed treatment by Varahamihira in his Brihat-Samhita (550 CE). Modern scholars believe the decans were imported into India through the Greeks, who learned about them from the Egyptians.

== See also ==
- Asterism (astronomy)
- Astronomical ceiling of Senemut Tomb
- Behenian fixed star
- Chinese zodiac
- Palazzo Schifanoia, Ferrara
- Worship of heavenly bodies
