= Éric Aubourg =

French astrophysicist

Éric Aubourg is a French astrophysicist at the Commissariat à l'Énergie Atomique and a member of the APC/Université Paris-Diderot Cosmology Group.

== Life ==
Éric Aubourg has published several contributions to Egyptology, including a dating of the Dendera zodiac, whose age was a subject of 19th-century archaeological debate.

He also likely authored MacScribe, a hieroglyph-typesetting software for Macintosh which originated from the same department he collaborated with on the Dendera dating, and is attributed to someone with his name.

== Egyptology papers ==
- "Espaces, lumières et composition architecturale au temple d'Hathor à Dendara. Résultats préliminaires" (PDF). BIFAO. 100. Institut français d'archéologie orientale - Le Caire: 47–77. 2000.
- "Sirius et le cycle sothiaque" (PDF). BIFAO. 100. Institut français d'archéologie orientale - Le Caire: 37–46. 2000.
- "La date de conception du zodiaque du temple d'Hathor à Dendera" (PDF). BIFAO. 95. Institut français d'archéologie orientale - Le Caire: 1–10. 1995.

== See also ==
- List of Egyptologists
