= Sārāvalī =

Early Hindu astrology text

Kalyanavarman is also the name of a member of the Varman dynasty (5th century).

The Sārāvalī of Kalyāṇavarman is a foundational compilation of Indian astrology, dating to ca. 800 CE, somewhat post-dating the Bṛhat Parāśara Horāśāstra.

An English translation was published by N.N. Krishna Rau and V.B. Choudhari in 1961 (in two volumes. 1983 reprint by Renjan Publications).

== Date ==
Kalyana-varman definitely lived after Varahamihira (6th-century), who he mentions in his work. He also respectfully mentions an astronomer whose name starts with "Brahma-": this appears to be a reference to Brahmagupta, who is the only famous astronomer bearing such a name. Brahmagupta's Brahmasphuta Siddhanta dates to 628 CE (Shaka 550), so Kalyana-varman must be dated around 628 CE or later.

Utpala alias Bhattotpala quotes Kalyana-varman in his commentaries on Varahamihira's Brhat-samhita and Brhaj-jataka. Utpala's date is a matter of debate (see Utpala (astronomer)#Date), with two different theories dating his commentaries to c. 830-831 CE and c. 965-966 CE, either of which can be Kalyana-varmna's latest date.

Some manuscripts of Sārāvalī credit Utpala with completing Kalyana-varman's work. For example, a manuscript dated to c. 1632 CE (Vikrama Samvat 1575) states that Sārāvalī had been incomplete for "hundreds of years" before Utpala completed it. According to S.L. Katre, the use of the plural term "hundreds" indicates that Utpala lived at least 300 years after Kalyana-varman. Ajay Mitra Shastri, who dates Utpala to c. 830, argues that this would place Kalyana-varman around c. 530 CE, which is not possible since 628 CE must be his earliest date. Therefore, Shastri theorizes that "hundreds" in this context refers to a long period of time in generic sense. Theorizing that Kalyana-varman and Utpala must have lived at least 100 years apart to justify the use of this term, Shastri fixes c. 730 CE as the latest date for Kalyana-varman.

Various estimates of Kalyana-varman's date include:

- Ajay Mitra Shastri: 628-730 CE
- Sudhakara Dvivedi: c. 628 CE
- Sadashiva L. Katre: c. 650 CE
- D.C. Bhattacharya: c. 750 CE
- Shankar Balkrishna Dikshit: c. 899 CE
