= Arundhati (Hinduism) =

Wife of Vasishtha in Hinduism

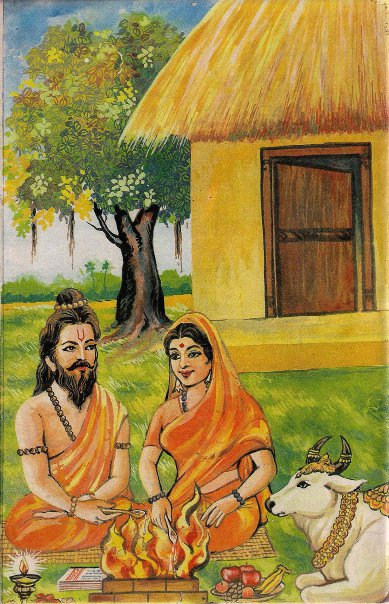
- Vasishtha and Arundhati performing a Yajna, with Kamadhenu, in their Ashram. Art from the back cover of the Hindi epic Arundhati (1994).

Personal life
- Spouse: Vasishtha
- Children: Śakti Maharṣi, Citraketu, Surocis, Virajas, Mitra, Ulbana, Vasubhrdyana and Dyumat

Religious life
- Religion: Hinduism

Arundhati (Sanskrit: अरुन्धती, romanized: Arundhatī) is the wife of the sage Vasishtha, one of the seven sages (Saptarshi) of Hinduism.

== Etymology ==
The name Arundhatī in Sanskrit literally means 'washed by the rays of sun', from arun 'sun rays', and dhatī , 'washed'.

== Legend ==
Arundhati's birth and life are mentioned in various Hindu scriptures. The birth of Arundhati is found in the Shiva Purana and Bhagavata Purana. The instruction by Brahma to Arundhati is described in the Uttara Kanda of the Ramcharitmanas. The rivalry between Vishvamitra and Vasishtha which leads to the death of her hundred sons is described in the Balakanda of Valmiki's Ramayana. The Mahabharata and several Brahmana works describe her sons, including Shakti, and grandson Parashara. Arundhati's meetings with Sita and Rama are mentioned in the Ramayana, Ramcharitmanas and Vinaya Patrika. Her role in pleading Shiva to marry Parvati is described in the sixth canto of Kumarasambhava of Kalidasa.

As per the Bhagavata Purana, Arundhati is the eighth among the nine daughters of Kardama and Devahuti. She is the grandmother of Parashara and the great-grandmother of Vyasa. The Shiva Purana describes her as being Sandhya, the mind-born daughter of Brahma, in a previous birth. On instruction of Vasishtha, Sandhya pleased Shiva by penance in order to purify herself from passion, and Shiva asked her to jump into Medhatithi's fire. She was then born as Medhatithi's daughter and married Vasishtha. Some other Puranas describe her as the daughter of Kashyapa and sister of Narada and Parvata, and she was offered in marriage to Vasishtha by Narada.

The Mahabharata describes Arundhati as an ascetic who used to give discourses to even the seven sages. The wife of Agni, Svaha, could therefore assume the form of the wives of the other six seers amongst Saptarshi but not that of Arundhati. The epic also narrates how once she pleased Shiva when it did not rain for 12 years and the seven seers were suffering without roots and fruits. Her chastity and service to her husband is mentioned as unparalleled in the Mahabharata.

As per the Valmiki Ramayana, she bore a hundred sons, who were all cursed to die by Vishvamitra. She then bore a son named Shakti and later another one named Suyagya, who studied with Rama at Vasishtha's hermitage. Some sources say she had eight sons including Shakti and Chitraketu.

The life of Arundhati is described in the eponymous Hindi epic poem Arundhati composed by Jagadguru Rambhadracharya in 1994.

== Traditions ==
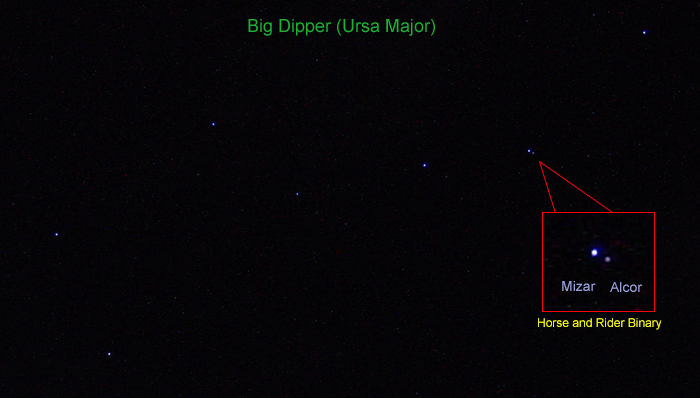
In traditional Indian astronomy, pair of Mizar and Alcor in constellation Ursa Major is known as Vasishtha and Arundhati

Arundhati is identified with the morning star and with the star Alcor, which forms a double star with Mizar (identified as Vasishtha Maharshi) in Ursa Major. Arundhati, though the wife of one of the seven seers, is accorded the same status as the seven seers and is worshipped with them as such. In Vedic and Puranic literature, she is regarded as the epitome of chastity, conjugal bliss and wifely devotion. In post-Puranic epic poems in Sanskrit and Hindi, she has been described as "chaste and revered" and with a character that is "unblemished, inspiring and worthy of imitation". In the Hindu culture, there are several beliefs, practices and traditions centred on Arundhati including a ritual in the marriage ceremony after the Saptapadi, a fast, a belief about imminent death, and a maxim.

In one of the rituals of a Hindu marriage, the groom shows the bride the double stars of Vasishtha and Arundhati as an ideal couple, symbolic of marital fulfilment and loyalty. The couples are asked to look up to the constellation symbolizing conjugal love and affection. On the second bright day of the lunar month of Chaitra, a fast in her honour is observed in certain regions of India by ladies whose husbands are alive. This fast is observed with the belief that the ladies observing it would not be widowed.

Since the Arundhati star is faintly visible, there is a belief that when someone is near death, they can not see the Arundhati star. Due to its faintness, the Arundhati used to be shown in steps, first showing the brighter stars, and then relative to that the faint Arundhati star is directed. The maxim in Sanskrit called the Arundhatī Darśana Nyāya (Sanskrit: अरुन्धतीदर्शनन्यायः), used in the meaning of inferring the unknown from that which is known, is named after Arundhati.
