= Saravali, Dahanu =

Village in Maharashtra

Saravali सरावली
- village
- Location in Maharashtra, India Saravali (India)
- Coordinates: 19.7786299°N 72.7496145°E
- Country: India
- State: Maharashtra
- District: Palghar
- Taluka: Dahanu
- Elevation: 4 m (13 ft)

Population (2011)
  - Total: 5,402
- Time zone: UTC+5:30 (IST)
- 2011 census code: 551610

Saravali is a village in the Palghar district of Maharashtra, India. It is located in the Dahanu taluka.

== Demographics ==
According to the 2011 census of India, Saravali has 1171 households. The effective literacy rate (i.e. the literacy rate of population excluding children aged 6 and below) is 68.74%.

Demographics (2011 Census)
	Total	Male	Female
Population	5402	2726	2676
Children aged below 6 years	642	319	323
Scheduled caste	143	78	65
Scheduled tribe	1975	954	1021
Literates	3272	1894	1378
Workers (all)	2228	1519	709
Main workers (total)	2079	1452	627
Main workers: Cultivators	96	68	28
Main workers: Agricultural labourers	175	92	83
Main workers: Household industry workers	37	20	17
Main workers: Other	1771	1272	499
Marginal workers (total)	149	67	82
Marginal workers: Cultivators	20	7	13
Marginal workers: Agricultural labourers	29	9	20
Marginal workers: Household industry workers	15	9	6
Marginal workers: Others	85	42	43
Non-workers	3174	1207	1967
