= Saravali, Bhiwandi =

Village in Maharashtra

Saravali
- village
- Location in Maharashtra, India Saravali (India)
- Coordinates: 19.2723888°N 73.0936509°E
- Country: India
- State: Maharashtra
- District: Thane
- Taluka: Bhiwandi
- Elevation: 10 m (33 ft)

Population (2011)
  - Total: 3,532
- Time zone: UTC+5:30 (IST)
- 2011 census code: 552653

Saravali is a village in the Thane district of Maharashtra, India. It is located in the Bhiwandi taluka.

== Demographics ==
According to the 2011 census of India, Saravali has 978 households. The effective literacy rate (i.e. the literacy rate of population excluding children aged 6 and below) is 81.48%.

Demographics (2011 Census)
	Total	Male	Female
Population	3532	2352	1180
Children aged below 6 years	363	185	178
Scheduled caste	43	20	23
Scheduled tribe	50	35	15
Literates	2582	1836	746
Workers (all)	1683	1564	119
Main workers (total)	1376	1265	111
Main workers: Cultivators	52	39	13
Main workers: Agricultural labourers	7	3	4
Main workers: Household industry workers	31	25	6
Main workers: Other	1286	1198	88
Marginal workers (total)	307	299	8
Marginal workers: Cultivators	35	34	1
Marginal workers: Agricultural labourers	1	1	0
Marginal workers: Household industry workers	0	0	0
Marginal workers: Others	271	264	7
Non-workers	1849	788	1061
