= Bṛhat Saṃhitā =

6th-century Sanskrit-language encyclopedia

Bṛhat-saṃhitā (Note: IAST: Bṛhat-saṃhitā; also transliterated as Brihat-samhita; also known as Varāhi-saṃhitā.) is a 6th-century Sanskrit-language encyclopedia compiled by Varāhamihira in present-day Ujjain, India. Besides the author's area of expertise—astrology and astronomy—the work contains a wide variety of other topics. His book is divided into 3 sections namely Tantra, Hora and Samhita.

== Contents ==
According to the penultimate verse of the text, it contains 100 chapters in less than 4000 shlokas (verses). Sudhakara Dvivedi's edition of the text, with Utpala's commentary, contains 105 chapters, plus the last chapter containing the table of contents; H. Kern's edition contains an additional chapter (#36) titled Raja-lakshnam. According to Utpala, Varahamihira excludes five chapters from the contents, thus arriving at 100 as the number of chapters; However, Varahamihira himself excludes 3 more chapters from the table of contents, bringing the number of chapters to only 97; so, it is not clear how exactly is the number 100 is arrived at.

Utpala cites the authorship of one of the excluded chapters to Vidhya-vasin. He also declares four verses to be spurious, and does not comment on two additional verses, which suggests that these may be later interpolations.

List of chapters from M. Ramakrishna Bhat's edition
1. Introduction
2. Canons for Astrologers
3. Transit of the Sun
4. Transit of the Moon
5. Course of Rahu
6. Transit of Mars
7. Transit of Mercury
8. Course of Jupiter
9. Course of Venus
10. Transit of Saturn
11. Comets
12. Canopus
13. Course of the Seven Sages (Big Dipper)
14. Divisions of globe
15. Stellar rulership
16. Planetary rulership
17. Planetary wars
18. Conjunction of the Moon with planets of stars
19. Planetary years and effects
20. The Planetary Triangle
21. Pregnancy of Clouds
22. Retention of Embryo
23. Rainfall
24. The Moon's Conjunction with Rohini
25. The Moon's Conjunction with Svati
26. The Moon's Conjunction with Asadha
27. The Wind Circle
28. Signs of Immediate Rain
29. Prognostics from Flowers and Creepers
30. Indications at Dawn and Twilight
31. Glow at the Horizon
32. Signs of Earthquake
33. Signs of Meteors
34. Characteristics of Halos
35. Signs of Rainbows
36. Signs of Aerial City
37. Mock Suns
38. Indications of Haze
39. Symptoms of Hurricane
40. Growth of Crops
41. Classification of Substances
42. Fluctuations of Prices
43. Glory of Indra's Banner
44. Lustration Ceremony
45. The Wagtail
46. Portentous Phenomena
47. Motley Miscellany
48. Royal Ablution
49. Signs of Crowns
50. Signs of Swords
51. Science of Limbs
52. Characteristics of Pimples
53. Architecture
54. Exploration of Water Springs
55. Treatment of Trees
56. Description of Temples
57. Preparation of Adamantine Glue.
58. Description of Idols
59. Entering Forest
60. Installation of Images
61. Features of Cows
62. Characteristics of Dogs
63. Signs of Cocks
64. Characteristics of Toroises
65. Signs of Goats
66. Characteristics of Horses
67. Signs of Elephants
68. Signs of Men
69. Signs of the Great Five Men
70. Characteristics of Maidens
71. Omens from Slits of Garments
72. Signs of Chowries
73. Signs of Umbrellas
74. Praise of Women
75. Winning of Affection
76. Erotic Recipes
77. Preparation of Perfumes
78. Union of Man and Woman
79. Signs of Couches and Seats
80. Examination of Gems
81. Signs of Pearls
82. Signs of Rubies
83. Signs of Emeralds
84. Signs of Lamps
85. Token of Tooth Sticks
86. Omens through Birds and Beasts
87. The Circle of Quarters
88. Cries of Birds and Beasts
89. The Circle of Dogs
90. The Cries of Jackals
91. Behaviour of Wild Animals
92. Intention of Cows
93. Intention of Horses
94. Attitude of Elephants
95. Cries of Crows
96. Further Omens
97. Time of Fruition of Effects
98. Functions and Properties of Asterisms
99. Functions and Properties of Lunar Days
100. Qualities of the Karanas
101. Effects of Birth in the Asterisms
102. Division of the Zodiac
103. Planetary Combinations at Marriage
104. Transits of Planets
105. Worship of the Stellar Day
106. Conclusion

The contents of the text fall into two major categories: anga and upanga. The anga discusses divination based on planets, asterisms, and zodiac signs. The upanga discusses a wide variety of other topics, as listed above. Varāhamihira does not discuss several traditional topics which he considers legendary and unscientific.

The text displays Varāhamihira's skill as a poet: it uses at least 63 different metres (Arya being the most frequent) in the Brihat-samhita.

Manuscripts of Bṛhat Saṃhitā

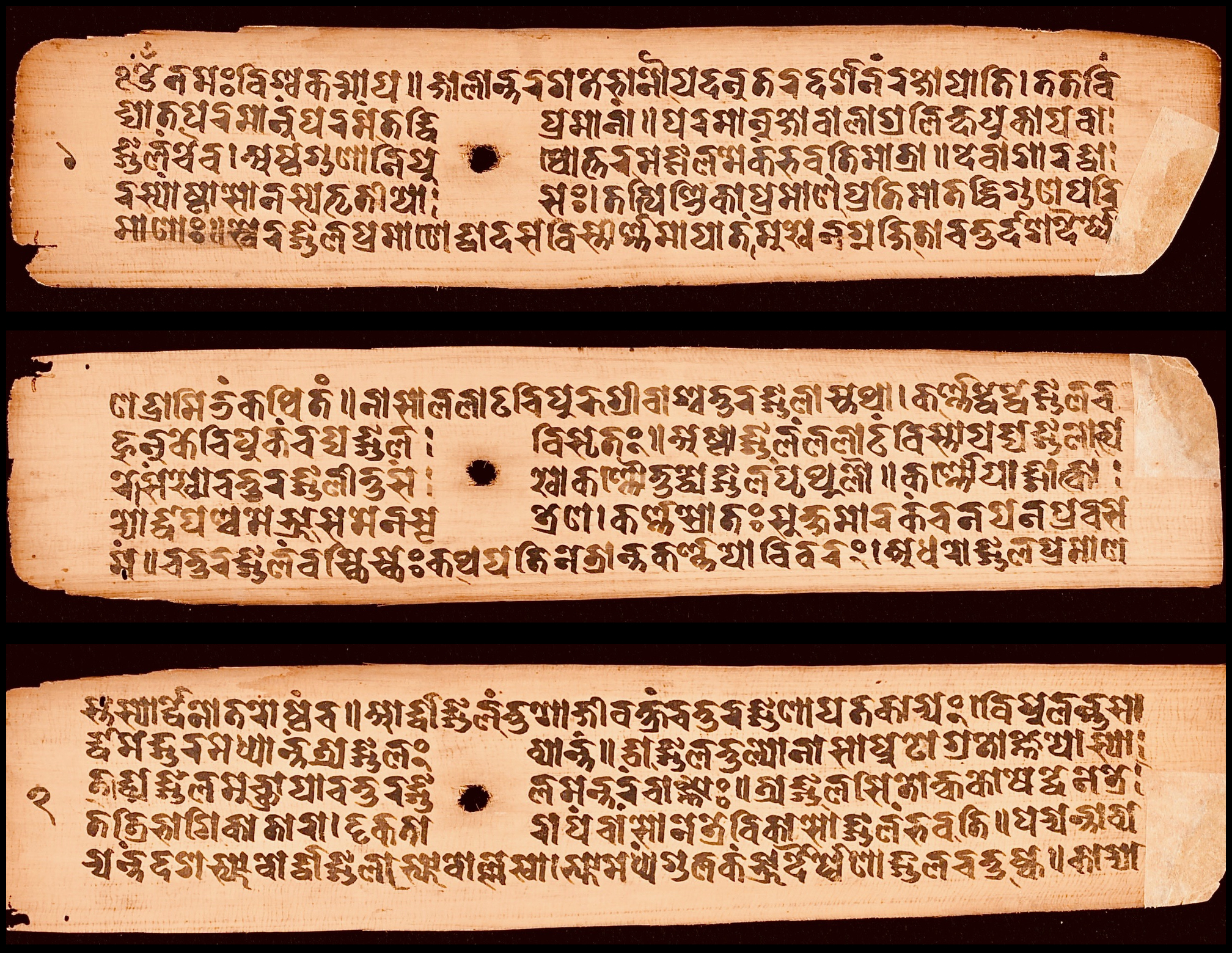
MS Cambridge CUL Add.1706. A 1279 CE palm-leaf manuscript in Nepalaksara script originally from a Buddhist monastery.

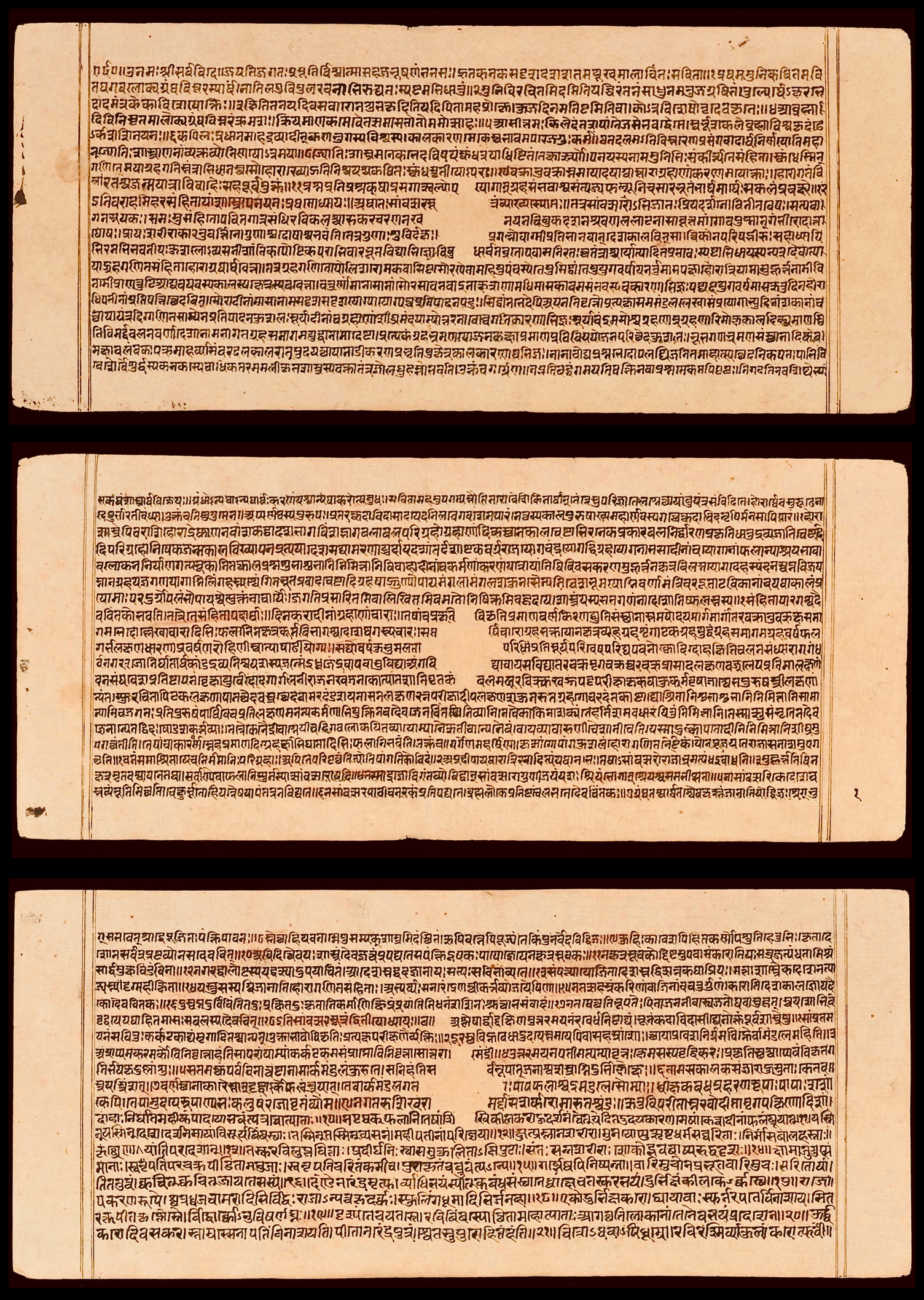
MS Cambridge CUL MS Add.2329. A manuscript in Devanagari script originally from a Jain temple.

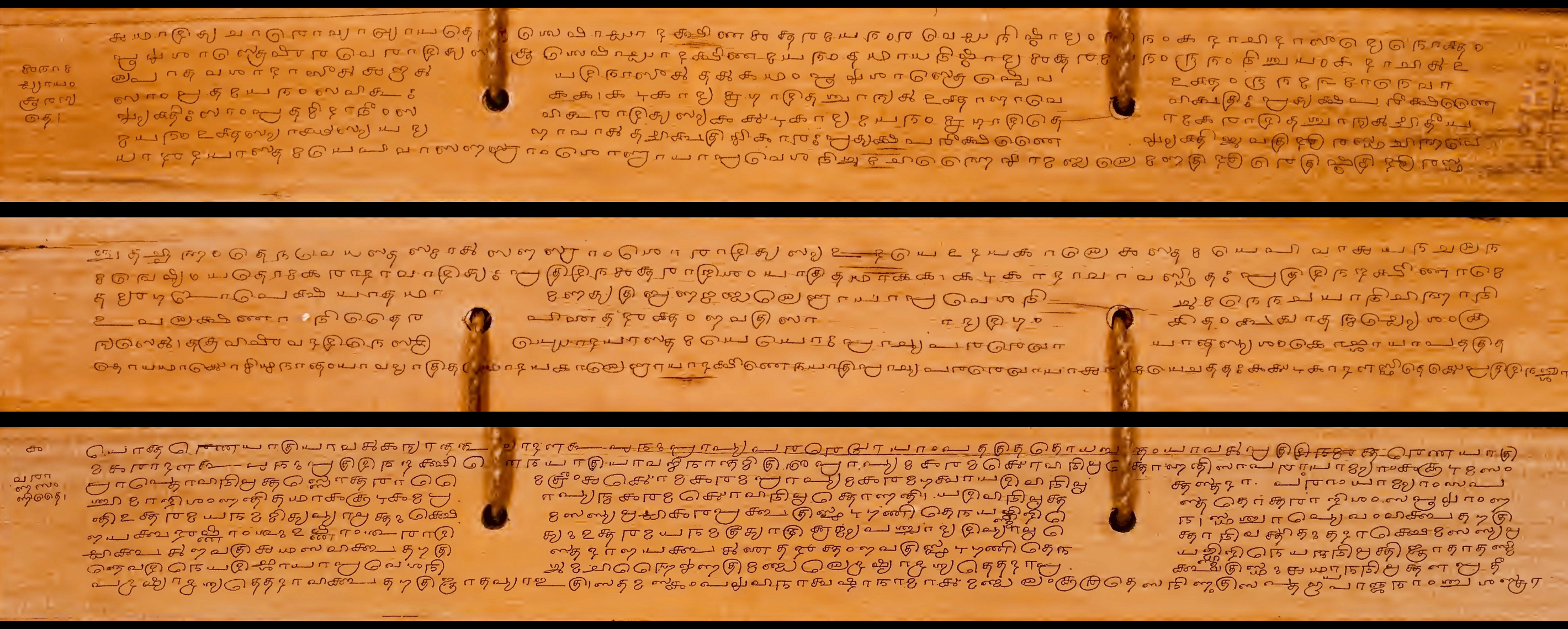
Manuscript with Utpala's commentary in Grantha script

== Influence ==
Varāhamihira's text became far more popular than earlier similar texts, because of its comprehensiveness, lucidity, appealing presentation, and literary merit. He wrote an abridged version of the text, Samāsa Saṃhitā, which is now lost and is known only from Utpala's commentary on Brhat-samhita.

According to Varāhamihira, in some verses he was merely summarizing earlier existing literature on astronomy, Shilpa Sastra and temple architecture, yet his presentation of different theories and models of design are among the earliest texts that have survived.

Several chapters of the text - such as Chitraymayura, Drgargala (Jalagala-shastra) and Prasada-lakshana - were studied as independent treatises by later scholars, who regarded Varāhamihira as an authority on a variety of topics. 11th-century Iranian scholar Al-Biruni also quotes Brhat-samhita.

Abd Al-Aziz ibn Shams ibn Baha' Nuri Dihlavwi (fl. c. 1350/1375) composed Tarjamah i Barahi, a Persian translation of Brhat-samhita, for the Delhi Sultan Firuz Shah Tughluq.

For modern scholars, the wide range of the text makes it a very useful source of history about the contemporary period.

== Editions ==
Printed editions and translations of the text include:

- 1895-97, Varanasi: Edited with Bhattotpala's commentary by Sudhakara Dvivedi (2 volumes)
- 1865, Calcutta: Edited by H. Kern
- 1870-1875: English translation by H. Kern in Journal of the Royal Asiatic Society
- 1947, Bangalore: Text with English translation by V. Subrahmanya Sastri and M. Ramakrishna Bhat (2 volumes)
