= Hora (astrology) =

Indian system of astrology known as Jyotiṣa

Horā (Sanskrit: होरा)) is a branch of the Indian system of astrology known as Jyotiṣa. It deals with the finer points of predictive methods, as distinct from Siddhānta (astronomy proper) and Saṃhita (mundane astrology).

The various aspects of hora are:

- Jātaka Shāstra (Natal astrology): Prediction based on individual horoscope.
- Muhurta or Muhurtha (Electional astrology): Selection of beneficial time to initiate an activity to get maximum fruition from the life activities.
- Swara Shāstra (Phonetical astrology): Predictions based on name & sounds.
- Prashna (Horary astrology): Predictions based on time when a question is asked by querent / querist.
- Ankjyotish / Kabala (Numerology): A branch of astrology based on numbers.
- Nadi Astrology: An ancient treatise having detailed predictions for individuals.
- Tajika Shāstra / Varsha Phal (Annual Horoscopy): Astrology based on annual solar returns.
- Jaimini Sutras: A non-conventional method of timing of events used by Indian astrologer Acharya Jaimini.
- Nastjātakam (Lost Horoscopy): Art of tracing / construction of lost horoscopes.
- Streejātaka (female astrology): A special branch of astrology dealing with female nativities.
- Graha Samudriki (Astro-Palmistry): Palm reading as horoscope.
- Hasta Rekha / Samudrika Shāstra (Palmistry): Based on palm reading.
- Padatala Shāstra (Plantarology): Based on reading of lines & signs on the sole.
- Shakuna Shāstra (Omens): Predictions based on omens & portents.
- Swapna Vidya : Interpretation of dreams.
- Kapala Vidya (Phrenology)
- Ākriti Vidya (Physiognomy): Based on structure & moles on the body.
- Kerala Jyotisha: Predictions based on querrist reply regarding name of flower or colour or touching part of body.
- Remedial Astrology: Various modes of propitiation of planets based on planetary positions in nativity, transits, elections & for religious functions.

== See also ==
- Horology
- Hindu astrology
- Bṛhat Parāśara Horāśāstra
