= Brihat Parashara Hora Shastra =

Hindu astrological text

The Brihat Parashara Hora Shastra (Sanskrit: बृहत् पराशर होरा शास्त्र; IAST: bṛhat parāśara horā śāstra; abbreviated to BPHS) is the most comprehensive extant Śāstra on Vedic natal astrology, in particular the Horā branch (predictive astrology, e.g. horoscopes). Though ascribed to Maharṣi Parāśara, the origin and date of the original composition is unknown. The most popular version of the BPHS consists of 97 chapters, a 1984 translation by R. Santhanam.

== Nomenclature ==
'bṛhat parāśara horā śāstra' (बृहत् पराशर होरा शास्त्र) can be loosely translated to examples such as 'the great book on horoscopy by Parashara' or 'Great Parashara's manual on Horoscopic astrology':

- 'bṛhat' (बृहत्) means 'great, large, wide, vast, abundant, compact, solid, massy, strong, mighty' or 'full-grown, old' or 'extended or bright (as a luminous body)' or 'clear, loud (said of sounds)'.
- 'parāśara' (पराशर) is the name of a Vedic Maharishi ('great Rishi')
- 'horā' (होरा) means 'horoscope or horoscopy'; also means "hour" or "time", loosely cognate with Greek (ώρα).
- 'śāstra' (शास्त्र) means 'compendium', 'book', 'manual', 'rule', 'instruction', 'science', and 'advice'.

== Summary ==
Venerable Parāśara, leader among Muni-Sages [said:] Jyotiṣa, the supreme limb of the Vedas, has three divisions - Horā, Gaṇita and Saṃhita. Excellent is Hora among the three distributions, consisting of the general part of Jyotisa.

— Way of the native: Parasara's Hora Sastra By Dev Bhattacharyy, Chapter 1, Verse 1

The Jyotiṣa - Vedic Astrology - is one of the Vedāṅga or six disciplines linked with the Vedas to support Vedic rituals. The three branches of Jyotiṣa are:

- Horā: Predictive astrology (e.g. Natal (genethliac) astrology, horoscopic astrology, personal horoscopes, etc.)
- Siddhānta: Mathematical astronomy (e.g. planetary distances, movements, sizes, strengths, etc.)
- Saṃhita: Mundane astrology (e.g. collective culture, community, and society)

The Bṛhat Parāśara Horā Śāstra is concerned with the predictive branch of Horā, used, for example, to determine the appropriate and most auspicious times for various events and ceremonies (i.e. depending on the anticipated planetary and star movements and positions).

== Origin and authenticity ==
J. Gonda states that at 'some time after 600 [C.E.] was written the purva-khanda of what was to become known as the Brhatparasarahora [Brihat Parashara Hora Shastra], ascribed to Parashara. it is deeply indebted to the [Brhajjataka of Varahamihira]; it has also borrowed two verses from Sphujidhvaja... and its existence is presupposed by the author of the uttara-khanda, which was commented on by Govindasvamin in ca. 850 [C.E.]. Therefore, the purva-khanda must have been written between ca. 600 and 750... but before 800'.

Additionally Bhaṭṭotpala (circa 900 C.E.) was a Vedic astrologer that 'in his commentaries he wrote that though he had heard of [the] Bṛhat Parāśara Horā Śāstra, he had never seen it. Thus we know it was lost for at least nine hundred years, until new manuscripts emerged from the early 20th century (see below).

As such, there are doubts in regards to the authenticity of various manuscripts of the Bṛhat Parāśara Horā Śāstra (BPHS) that emerged centuries later. One concern raised is the apparent admission by Sitram Jha in his 1944 publication of the BPHS that he changed and removed elements of the manuscript. Another concern raised by Vedic Astrologers such as Shyamasundara Dasa 'that casts doubt on the veracity of the modern BPHS is the complete lack of any ancient commentary on the text. The oldest commentary known to me is that of Devacandra Jha's Hindi commentary from the first half of the 20th century, that is, less than 100 years old'.

=== Editions and translations ===
According to R. Santhanam and J. Gonda, the following are the modern translations (and manuscripts) of the Bṛhat Parāśara Horā Śāstra (BPHS):

Editors / translators	Edition name	Chapters	Verses	First published	Description
Giridhara Lala Sarma and Govinda Sarma (Sri Venkateswara Press, Bombay)			5781	1905	First printed version of the BPHS. Partial Hindi, mostly Sanskrit commentary. reprinted by Khemraj Press in 1961.
Thakuradasa Cudamana (Calcutta)				1926	Bengali translation
Sitaram Jha	Varanasi	71	5100	1944	translated to Hindi. Apparently admitted tampering with his published version of the BPHS manuscript.
Devachandra Jha (Chaukhambha Publications)	Chaukambha				translated to Hindi; similar to the Varanasi edition.
Ganesa Datta Pathak	Thakur Prasad			1972	translated to Hindi
C.G. Rajan		36			Tamil translation; without Sanskrit verses
N.N.K. Rao and V.B. Choudhari		25		1963	English translation (2 volumes); without Sanskrit slokas
R. Santhanam (Ranjan Publications, New Delhi)		97		1984	English translation. 97 chapters with Sanskrit slokas.
André Kërr (Academia Brasileira de Astrologia Védica)	A Bíblia da Astrologia Védica	97		2017	Brazilian portuguese translation (2 volumes in 1). 97 chapters without Sanskrit slokas.

== Notes and references ==
=== References ===
- David Pingree, Jyotiḥśāstra in J. Gonda (Ed.) A History of Indian Literature, Vol VI Fasc 4 (1981)
