= Parashara =

Ancient Indian sage

Maharishi Parashara
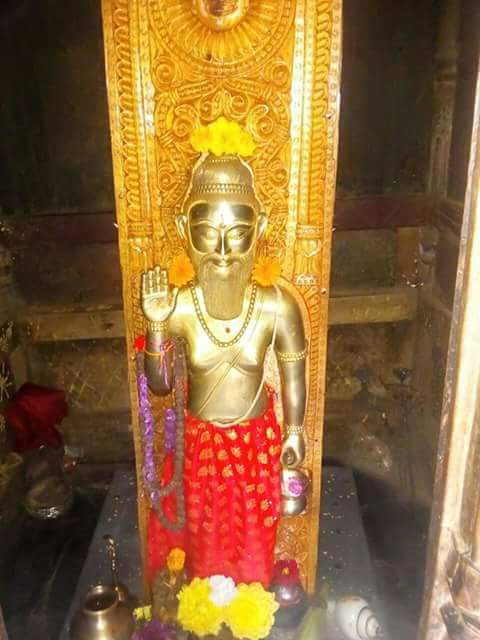
- A murti of Parashara

Personal life
- Children: Vyasa (by Satyavati)
- Parents: Shakti (father); Adrushyanti (mother)

Religious life
- Religion: Hinduism

Religious career
Disciples
  - Paila
  - Ashvala

Parashara (Sanskrit: पराशर; IAST: Parāśara) is a historical maharishi and is credited as the author of multiple ancient Indian texts, including the original Vishnu Purana (the first Purana), before his son Vyasa rewrote it.

He is the grandson of the sage Vasishtha and the son of the sage Shakti. Several texts refer to Parashara as an author or speaker. The texts attributed to him often present Parashara as speaking to a student.

== Origin of the name ==
According to legend, Vasishtha, Parashara's grandfather, attempted to commit suicide after Parashara's father, Shakti, and his other sons were devoured by the king Kalmashapada. He jumped from Mount Meru only to land on soft cotton. He then entered a forest fire only to remain unscathed, dove into the ocean but was cast ashore, and jumped into the overflowing river Vipasa only to end up on the banks. Finally, he jumped into the river Haimavat. The river, out of fear, split itself into several streams, thus giving the river the name Satadru.

When he returned to his ashram, he saw that his daughter-in-law was pregnant. When the child was born, Vashistha acted as the child's father and gave up his attempts at suicide. The child was named Parashara, which means enlivener of the dead.

== Genealogy ==
According to the Vedas, the god Brahma created Vasishtha (reborn to Mitra-Varuna), who, with his wife Arundhati, had a son named Shakti who sired Parashara. With Satyavati of the Kaivartta clan, Parashara was the father of Vyasa. Vyasa sired Dhritarashtra and Pandu through his deceased half-brother's wives, Ambika and Ambalika, and Vidura through a hand-maiden of Ambika and Ambalika. Vyasa also sired Shuka through his wife, Jabali's daughter Pinjala. Thus, Parashara was the biological grandfather of both the sides in the Mahabharata, the Kauravas and the Pandavas (though some think that the Pandavas were offspring of various gods and Kunti).

== Legend ==
=== Early life ===
As Parashara's biological father, the sage Shakti, died gruesomely before Parashara's birth in a thick forest, Vasishtha, Shakti's father, brought Adrushyanti (Parashara's biological mother) into his hermitage. When Vasishtha heard the chanting of the Vedas, Adrushyanti told him that the sounds were coming from his unborn grandson in her womb, which gladdened Vasishtha and she gave birth to Parashara.

Raised under the tutelage of his grandfather Vasishtha, Parashara grew up in the shadow of a tragic legacy of his father. At the hermitage, he encountered King Kalmashapada, who has been transformed into a cannibalistic Rakshasa due to a curse originally provoked by a dispute with Shakti himself. Driven by demonic hunger and the weight of the spell, the Rakshasa devoured Shakti, leaving the young Parashara fatherless and kindling a fierce, vengeful fire within him. As recorded in the Vishnu Purana, Parashara’s resentment was so potent that he initiated a grand sacrificial ritual intended to annihilate every Rakshasa in existence, an act of retribution that only the wisdom and intervention of Vasishtha could temper. Vaisistha advised Parashara to shun his anger, explaining that anger prevents the attainment of emancipation.

=== Birth of Vyasa ===
Parashara once came to the banks of the river Yamuna, and wished to cross it. A fisherman asked his daughter, Matsyagandha, whose name means "one with the smell of fish", to ferry the sage to his next destination. Attracted to her, Parashara expressed his desire to unite with her. However, Matsyagandha refused, fearing that other people and sages standing on the opposite bank of the river would see them.

The Mahabharata then credits him with creating an island within the river by his mystic potency and asked her to take the boat there. She, however declared that her body stank and Parashara granted her the boon of emitting the finest fragrance. She was thereafter known as Satyavati (pure fragrance). Matsyagandha was transformed (by the powers of the sage) into Yojanagandha ("she whose fragrance can be smelled from across a yojana"). She then smelled of musk, and so was called Kasturi-Gandhi ("musk-fragrant"). Then, she insisted that it was inappropriate to conceive a child in broad daylight, as her father and others would see them from the other bank; and that they should wait till nightfall. The sage, with his powers, shrouded the entire area in fog. Then, Parashara embraced her and by his mystic power, she became pregnant with Krishna Dvaipāyana Veda Vyasa, who was dark-complexioned and hence was called by the name Krishna (black) and also the name Dwaipayana, meaning 'island-born'. Later, Parashara took him with himself and trained him in vedic studies. Vyasa later compiled the classic Vedic literatures of India, is regarded as the 17th incarnation of Vishnu. Later, Satyavati returned to her father's house and in due course, married Śantanu.

In Anushasana Parva of the Mahabharata, Parashara told Yudhisthira that he had prayed to Shiva to obtain a son with great ascetic merit, endowed with superior energy, who would earn worldwide fame, and arrange the Vedas. Shiva appeared and granted him his wishes and in addition, he told him that his son Krishna would be one of the Saptarshis of Savarni manvantara, would be immortal by being freed of diseases, and he would be a friend of Indra.

=== Death ===
Parashara is known as the "limping sage" as his leg was wounded during an attack on his āśrama. When a ṛishi dies, he merges back into an element or an archetype and as Sage Parashara walked through a dense forest, he and his students were attacked by wolves. He was unable to get away in his old age because of his lame leg and he left this world merging into the wolves.

== Rigveda ==
In the Rigveda, Parashara, son of Shakti (Parāśara Śāktya), is the seer of verses 1.65-73 which are all in praise of Agni (the sacred fire), and part of 9.97 (v.31-44) which is in praise of Soma. Below is 1.73.2:

devo na yaḥ savitā satyamanmā kratvā nipāti vṛjanāni viṣvā
purupraṣasto amatirna satya ātmeva Sevo didhiṣāyyo bhūt

According to H.H.Wilson's translations, "He who is like the divine Sun, who knows the truth (of all things), preserves by his actions (his votaries) in all encounters; like nature, he is unchangeable and, like soul, is the source of all happiness; he is ever to be cherished.

== Texts attributed to Parashara ==
- Parashara Smriti (also called Parashara Dharma Samhita): a code of laws which is stated in the text (1.24) to be for Kali Yuga.
- Speaker of Viṣṇu Purana to Maitreya.
- Speaker in Brihada Vishnu Purana to Maitreya.
- Speaker of the Bṛhat Parāśara Horāśāstra, abbreviated as BPHS. It is considered a foundational text of Hindu astrology.
- Speaker of the Vṛkṣāyurveda ("the science of life of trees"), one of the earliest texts on botany. This text was considered to be an ancient botany primer for students of Traditional Indian Medicine.
- Parashar Gita – philosophical dialogues with King Janaka.
- Mithila Mahatmya - the survived section of the larger text Brihada Vishnu Purana in Mithila. It is philosophical discourses and conversions between him and his disciple Maitreya.
