= Karak =

Karak may refer to:

== Places ==
- Al-Karak or Kerak, city in Jordan, named after Kerak Castle
  - Karak Governorate, Jordan
- al-Karak, Syria, city in Syria's Daraa Governorate
- Karak Nuh, village in the Beqaa Valley, Lebanon
- Karak, Iran (disambiguation)
- Karak, Pahang, town in Malaysia
- Karak Expressway, highway in Malaysia
- Karak, Pakistan, city in Pakistan
  - Karak District, district of Khyber Pakhtunkhwa, Pakistan
- Khirbet Kerak (Karak) or Beth Yerah, archaeological site on the Sea of Galilee, Israel

== Other uses ==
- Chai karak -- a variation of Masala chai served in the Arab world
- Karak (surname)
- Karak (mascot), the mascot for the 2006 Commonwealth Games

== See also ==
- Carrack, a three- or four-masted ocean-going sailing ship
- Karaka (disambiguation)
- Korak (disambiguation)
