= Astrological aspect (Hindu astrology) =

Drishti or glance of planets to other signs

Planetary aspects are interchange of energies at great distances; the respective mass of each planet generates and radiates its own specific energy-field. At times these planetary aspects take a lead over planetary conjunctions. Planetary aspects play an important role in predicting future events. However, there are three great differences between Western astrology and Hindu astrology in computing these aspects - (1) in the former system the count is made from degree to degree, in the latter system the count is made from sign to sign, (2) in the former system the aspect will be mutually the same i.e. if Mars and Jupiter are in trine it can be expressed as either Mars Trine Jupiter or Jupiter Trine Mars, in the latter system if Jupiter is in Aries and Mars in Leo, Jupiter will have full aspect on Mars but Mars will have 50% aspect on Jupiter and, (3) in the former system certain aspects such as sextile are good whereas square and opposition are evil, the latter system does not have such classification in which system aspects by benefic planets and those owning trines i.e. the 5th and the 9th, are always good, and by malefic planets and those owning cadent houses i.e. the 6th, 8th or 12th, are always evil; moreover, the aspect of any planet on its own sign strengthens that house and causes no harm to its indications.

== Nature of aspects ==
Aspects of natural benefics, the full Moon, Mercury, Venus and Jupiter, are considered to be productive of good results and those by natural malefics, the Sun, Mars and Saturn, evil. Natural benefics owning evil bhavas, combust or in debilitation sign or defeated in planetary-war (graha-yuddha) become tainted and prove contra-productive. Natural malefics owning auspicious bhavas, when they act as yogakarakas, tend to produce good results. These are the basic rules concerning planetary aspects.

An astrologer is required to make a careful note of all planetary positions, conjunctions and aspects which collectively form the fundamental basis for all predictions. Good results are produced by favourable planetary positions, and by benefic conjunctions and aspects, if not, unfavourable, mixed or evil results are produced.

In Hindu astrology, which is sidereal and takes cognisance of nine planets - the seven afore-mentioned and the two Lunar Nodes Rahu and Ketu, three systems are followed, namely, Parashari, Jaimini and Tajika. Indian astrologers favour the Parashari System.

== Planetary aspects according to the Parashari System of prognostication ==
According to Parashara all planets cast their aspects on the 3rd and the 10th bhava or house (i.e., at a distance of 60 degrees and 270 degrees), on the 5th and the 9th (120 degrees and 240 degrees), the 4th and the 8th (90 degrees and 210 degrees) and the 7th (180 degrees) but the strength of their aspect varies at different points. Therefore the 7 planets cast their aspects as follows:

1. Saturn casts its aspect of 1/4 strength on the 5th and the 9th, aspect of 1/2 strength on the 4th and the 8th, 3/4 strength on the 7th and full on the 3rd and the 10th bhavas;
2. Jupiter aspects the 4th and the 8th with 1/4 strength, the 7th with 1/2, the 3rd and the 10th with 3/4 and the 5th and the 9th with full strength whereas
3. Mars’s aspect is 1/4 at the 7th, 1/2 at the 3rd and the 10th, 3/4 at the 5th and the 9th and full at the 4th and the 8th.

These three extraterrestrial planets possess special aspects.

The aspect of the Sun, the Moon, Venus and Mercury is 1/4 at the 3rd and the 10th, 1/2 at the 5th and the 9th, 3/4 at the 4th and the 8th and full at the 7th. In actual practice, astrologers seem to ignore partial aspects.

The full aspect of a planet on another planet with that aspect returned in full by the aspected planet is by itself deemed by the ancient texts to be a major kind of Sambadha or planetary association. The five major associations are:

1. By mutual exchange of sign, e.g. the Sun in Aries and Mars in Leo,
2. By mutual aspect of planets, e.g. Saturn in Aries and Mars in Capricorn,
3. By occupying a particular sign other than its own, e.g. Jupiter in taurus sign owned by Venus,
4. By occupying mutual square positions, e.g. Jupiter in Aries and Mars in Cancer or Libra or Capricorn, and
5. By occupying mutual trinal positions, e.g. Jupiter in Aries and Mars in either Leo or in Sagittarius.

In Hindu astrology according to the Parashari system an aspect is counted from sign to sign. Planets do not cast their aspect on signs that are the 2nd, the 6th, the 8th and the 12th from their sign of occupancy, and also planets situated in the same sign do not aspect each other. Planets cast their aspect on the entire sign. The two Chayagrahas, Rahu and Ketu, do not aspect nor are they aspected even though the aspect of Rahu to the 5th and the 9th stands mentioned in the texts. But if the sign occupied by Rahu is aspected by Jupiter then due to the quality of that sign it tends to behave well. Aspects of the lords of auspicious bhavas such as the 5th and the 9th are particularly beneficial, and the aspects of the lords of evil bhavas such as the 6th, the 8th and the 12th are particularly malefic.

== Geometry behind planetary aspects ==
A geometric pattern can be derived based on Mars, Jupiter and Saturn's special aspects which reflects a pattern of 6-orthoplex.
A Dodecagon is used here, to represent 12 zodiac signs.

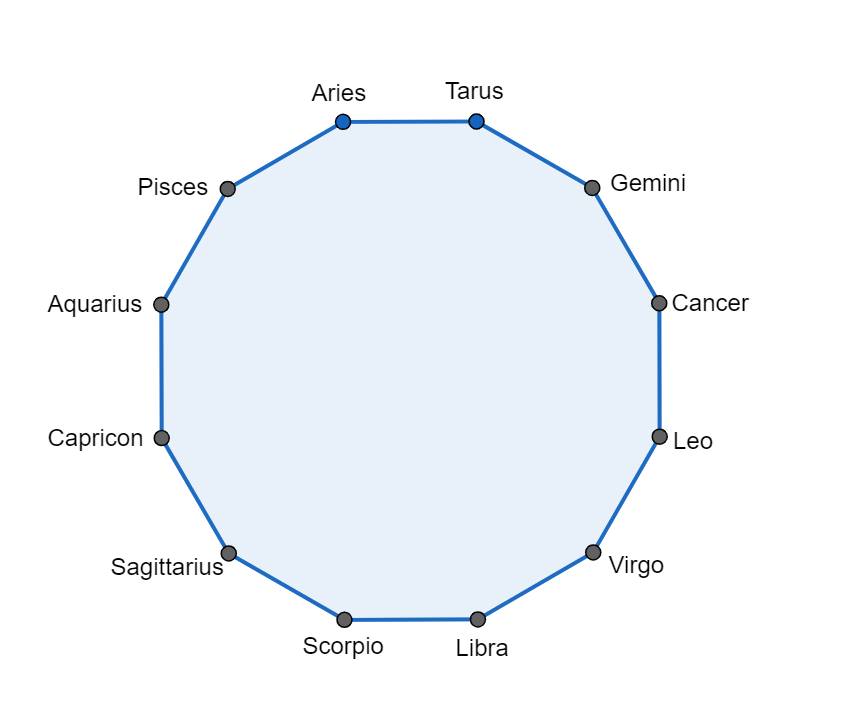
Dodecagon representing 12 Zodiac signs

Special aspects of Mars, Saturn & Jupiter:
Mars' special aspects - 4 & 8
Saturn's special aspect - 3 & 10
Jupiter's special aspects - 5 & 9

Planetary aspects diagram
S. No	Planet's aspect	Representation	Aspect diagram
1	Mars' 4th aspect	3 squares (Projecting forward)	Mars-4th-Aspect forming 3 squares forward
2	Mars' 8th aspect	One Dodecagram	Mars-8th-Aspect forming a star polygon
3	Saturn's 3rd aspect	2 hexagons	Saturn-3rd-Aspect forming 2 Hexagons
4	Saturn's 10th aspect	3 squares (Projecting backward)	Saturn-10th-Aspect forming 3 squares backward
5	Jupiter's 5th aspect	4 Triangles (Projecting forward)	Jupiter's-5th-Aspect forming 4 triangles forward
6	Jupiter's 9th aspect	4 Triangles (Projecting backward)	Jupiter's-9th-Aspect forming 4 triangles backward
7	Combined diagram after superimposing all 3 planets' aspects	Saturn's 3rd aspect - 2 hexagons drawn in black color Mars' 4th aspect (forward projecting squares). Also, Saturn's 10th aspect (backward projecting squares) - 3 squares drawn in Red color Mars' 8th aspect - One Dodecagram drawn in orange color Jupiter's 5th aspect. Also, Jupiter's 9th aspect - 4 Triangles drawn in blue color	Combined-Diagram-of-Special-Aspects-of-Mars-Saturn-and-Jupiter

Note:
1. Mars' 4th aspect forming 3 squares (projecting forward) superimposes Saturn's 10th aspect which forms another 3 squares (projecting backward) or vice versa (See Diagram No. 1 & 4)
2. Jupiter's 5th aspect forming 4 triangles(projecting forward) superimposes Jupiter's 9th aspect which forms another 4 triangles (projecting backward) or vice versa (See Diagram No. 5 & 6)

There is no visible reference about who introduced planetary aspects to Hindu Astrology.

== Planetary aspects according to the Tajika System of prognostication ==
According to the Tajika System, that in practice is applied more to Varshaphal (Annual Chart) or a query-chart (Horary astrology), the planetary aspect on the 5th and the 9th houses from itself is very strong, openly friendly and helpful, e.g. if the Sun is in Aries and Jupiter is in Leo both will aspect each other producing very favourable results. The aspect on the 3rd and the 11th is secretly friendly but very helpful with the former being stronger, e.g. if the Sun is in Aries and Jupiter in Gemini with both though aspecting each other the aspect of Sun will produce more favourable results than Jupiter. The aspect on the 4th and the 10th is secretly inimical, when planets forming such an aspect tend to produce bad results and cause disappointments, and on the 7th openly inimical, these aspects are unhelpful and often destructive. Tajika aspects are deemed effective within 12 degrees either side of the aspected point. This principle is followed by Western astrology. Benefic aspects cast on the 2nd and the 12th give happiness but inimical aspect on 6th, 7th and 8th and on itself cause many hardships. Aspects of partial strength are not generally taken into account.

The Tajika System also lays stress on the elevation gained by the aspecting planets. It states that in the circle (of houses) the left aspect is said to be very strong even as that from the 10th to the 4th, which means a planet in the visible semi-circle is more elevated, and therefore, stronger than a planet in the invisible semi-circle. Of course, the opposition and square aspects are not always evil.

According to the Tajika System, where unlike the Parashari System the good or bad nature of an aspect is not as per the relation between the aspecting and the aspected planet or sign but on the kind of the aspect itself, Yogas are formed on the basis of applying aspect, and by full and separating aspect as formed between relatively slow and fast moving planets.

== Planetary aspects according to the Jaimini System of prognostication ==
According to the Jaimini System, which is deemed complicated, and therefore, difficult to understand and apply, the Zodiacal signs aspect each other in their front excepting the adjoining signs, and those planets which occupy such signs will also aspect the planets situated in such bhavas. All Chara rasis (moveable signs) aspect all Sthira rasis (fixed signs) and vice versa, and Dwiswabhava rasis (common signs) aspect each other. This system lays stress on various karakas whose determination differs from the Parasari system, e.g. Jaimini Sutra 1.11 which states that of the seven, or eight planets including Rahu, whichever is most advanced in its respective sign of occupation becomes the Atmakaraka that gives bad or good results by virtue of its inherent and acquired qualities; the succeeding sutra states that the planet who is next less advanced becomes the Amatyokaraka. These karakas etc., along with planets in various sub-divisions of signs play a very important role in the matter of predictions. For example, vide Jaimini Sutra 1.3.24-27, if the 7th from the Upapada and its lord and the lord of the Kalatrakarakamsa and its lord, all four are aspected by Mercury, Saturn and Venus, the person will have no issue; if the 5th house from the 7th, from Upapada, its lord, the Kalatrakarakamsa and its lord have the aspects or conjunctions of the Sun, Rahu and Jupiter, the person will have many children, but if that house has only Moon's aspect or conjunction, the person will have only one son, or if these combinations for many issues and no issues are simultaneously found then predict birth of a child late in life.

Planets and rasis aspect other planets according to their dispositions which aspects' influences are affected for good or bad by their presence from an aspecting lord or sign which are the affecting or influencing agencies called Argalas. The 4th, the 2nd, 5th and the 11th from the aspecting body are Argalas, malefic in the 3rd give rise to evil Argala, planets in the 10th, 12th and 3rd from Argala cause obstruction to such Argala. If planets obstructing Argala are fewer or less powerful than those causing Argala, then the power of Argala cannot be affected, the houses or planets in the 5th and the 9th similarly influence the Argala but in case of Ketu the formation of Argala and obstruction to it must be calculated in the reverse order. B v Raman explains that the Argalas, generated by the disposition of planets as stated above gets cancelled by presence of planets in the 10th, 12th, 3rd or 9th from the aspecting planet.

Argala means obstruction or impediment for the free flow of planetary influences. Argala can, depending upon the influences exercised by planets occupying certain signs, become modified to produce good or bad results.
