= Karaka =

Karaka may refer to the following:

- Corynocarpus laevigatus, a tree endemic to New Zealand, commonly known as karaka
- Karaka (star), a star named after the karaka tree
- Karaka, New Zealand, a town
- Karaka or Atmakaraka, a concept in Vedic astrology (Jyotisha)
- Dosabhai Framji Karaka (1829–1902), Indian newspaper editor and historian
- A concept in the grammar of Pāṇini, roughly similar to the concept of thematic role or theta role

== See also ==
- Karak (disambiguation)
