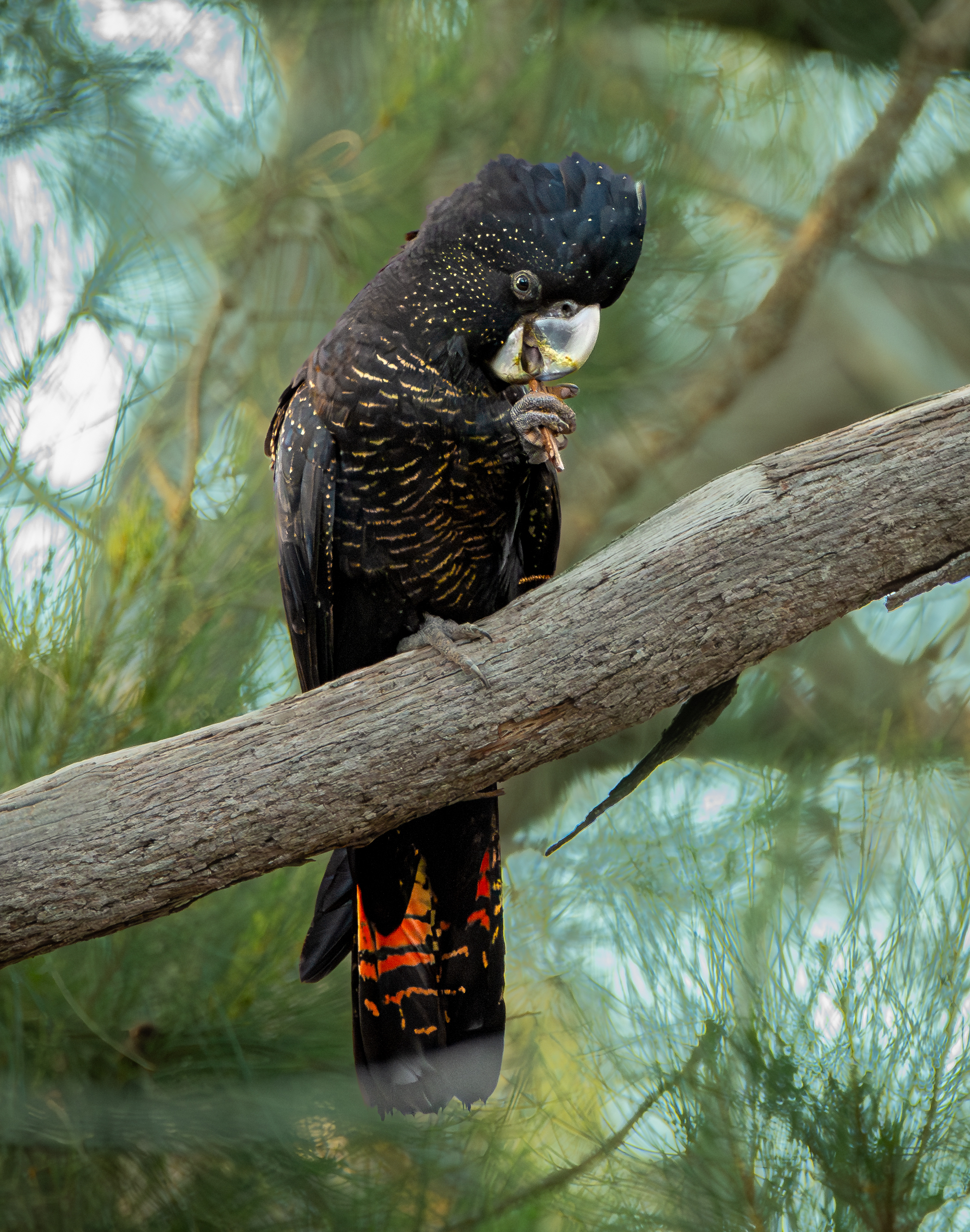
- Female sitting amongst Casuarina trees

Conservation status
- Least Concern (IUCN 3.1)

Scientific classification
- Kingdom: Animalia
- Phylum: Chordata
- Class: Aves
- Order: Psittaciformes
- Family: Cacatuidae
- Genus: Calyptorhynchus
- Species: C. banksii

Binomial name
- Calyptorhynchus banksii (Latham, 1790)

Subspecies
- C. b. banksii; C. b. graptogyne; C. b. macrorhynchus; C. b. naso; C. b. samueli
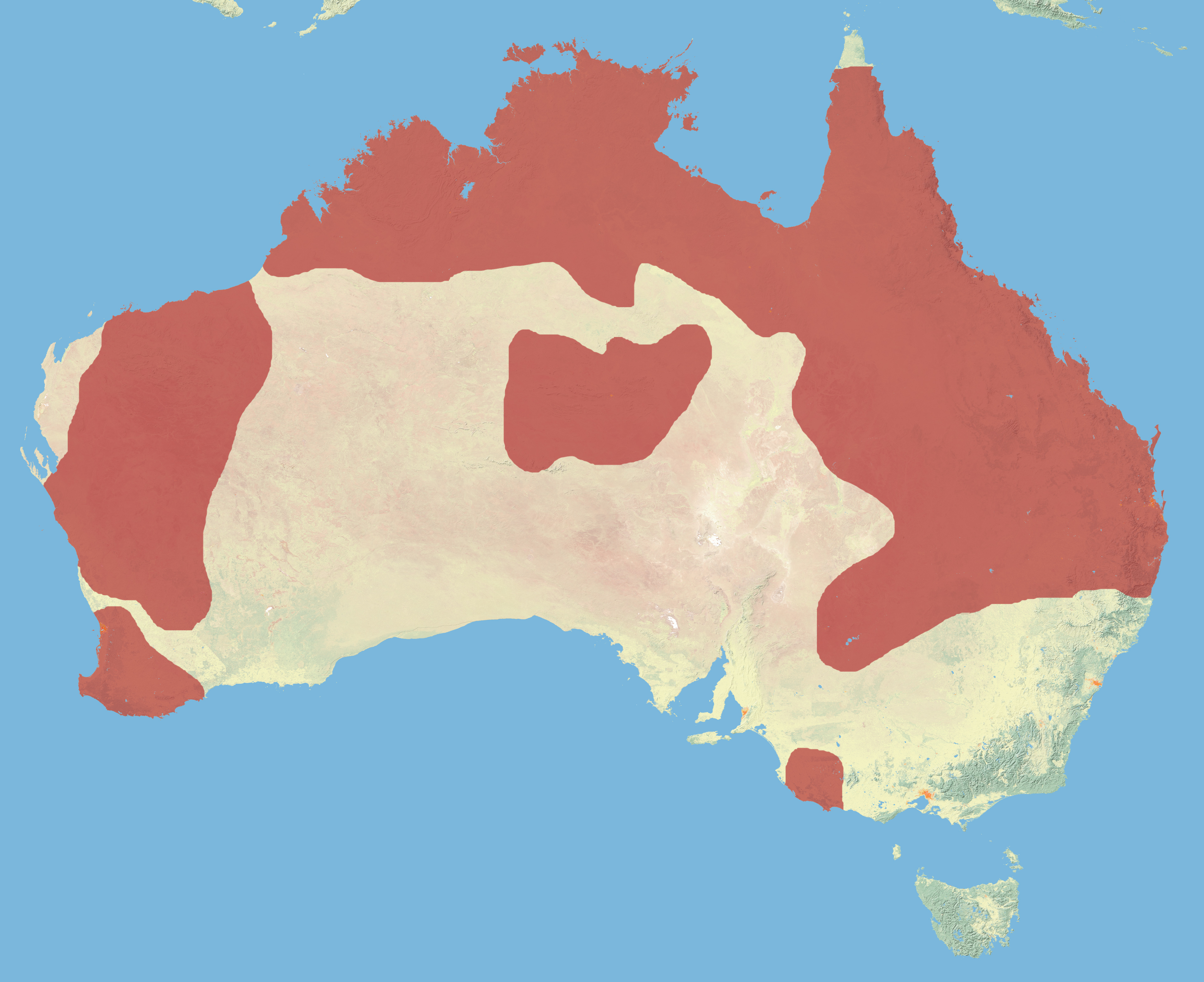
- Red-tailed black cockatoo range (in red)

= Red-tailed black cockatoo =

Large black cockatoo native to Australia

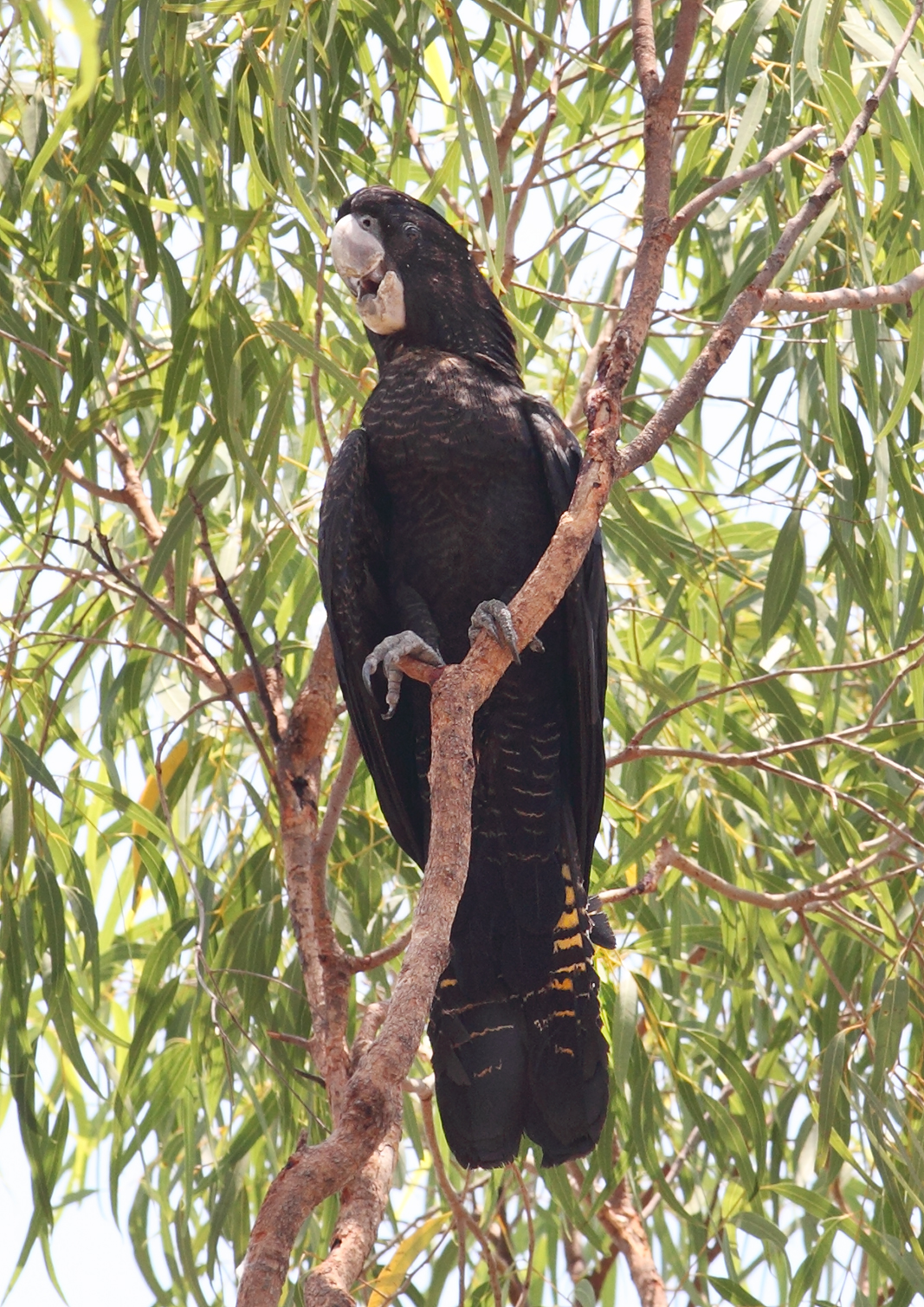
Female, Northern Territory

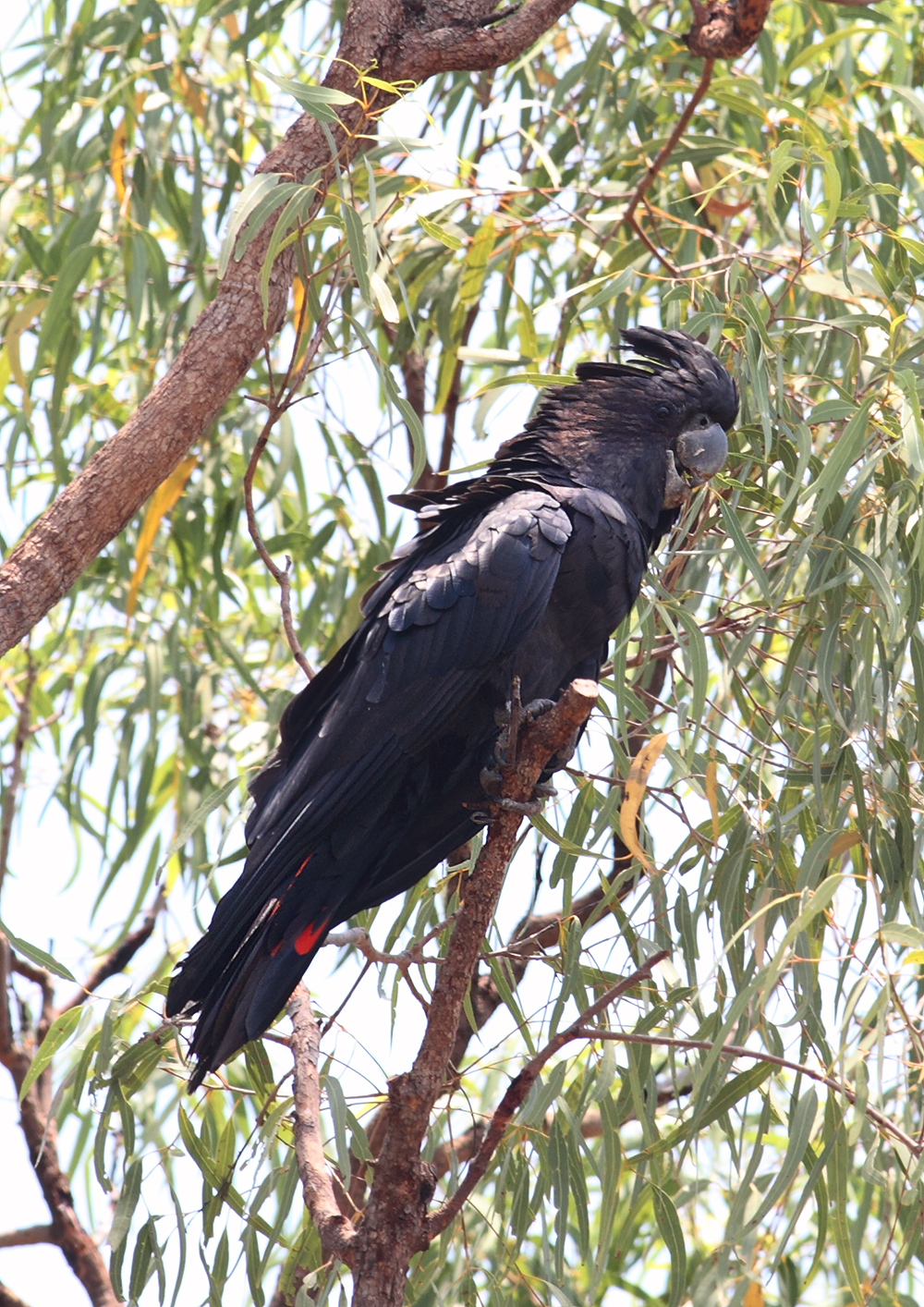
Male, Northern Territory

The red-tailed black cockatoo (Calyptorhynchus banksii) also known as Banksian- or Banks' black cockatoo, is a large black cockatoo native to Australia. Adult males have a characteristic pair of bright red panels on the tail that gives the species its name. It is more common in the drier parts of the continent. Five subspecies are recognised, differing chiefly in beak size. Although the more northerly subspecies are widespread, the two southern subspecies, the forest red-tailed black cockatoo and the south-eastern red-tailed black cockatoo are under threat.

The species is usually found in eucalyptus woodlands, or along water courses. In the more northerly parts of the country, these cockatoos are commonly seen in large flocks. They are seed eaters and cavity nesters, and as such depend on trees with fairly large diameters, generally Eucalyptus. Populations in southeastern Australia are threatened by deforestation and other habitat alterations. Of the black cockatoos, the red-tailed is the most adaptable to aviculture, although black cockatoos are much rarer and much more expensive in aviculture outside Australia.

== Taxonomy and naming ==
The species complex was first described by the ornithologist John Latham in 1790 as Psittacus banksii, commemorating English botanist Sir Joseph Banks. The red-tailed black cockatoo also has the distinction of being the first bird from Eastern Australia illustrated by a European, as a female, presumably collected at Endeavour River in north Queensland, was sketched by Banks' draughtsman Sydney Parkinson in 1770. Narrowly predating Latham, English naturalist George Shaw described Psittacus magnificus from a specimen collected somewhere in the Port Jackson (now Sydney) region. For many years, the species was referred to as Calyptorhynchus magnificus, proposed by Gregory Mathews in 1927 as Shaw's name had predated Latham's 1790 description. For several decades, Mathews' proposal was accepted by many authorities, although it was unclear whether the original Port Jackson reference had actually referred to the red-tailed black or, more likely, the glossy black cockatoo. In 1994, an application to conserve Calyptorhynchus banksii as the scientific name was accepted by the ICZN. The red-tailed black cockatoo is the type species of the genus Calyptorhynchus, the name of which is derived from the Greek calypto-/καλυπτο- "hidden" and rhynchus/ρυγχος "beak". The change was first made by Anselme Gaëtan Desmarest in 1826.

In 1827, Jennings proposed the name Psittacus niger for the bird. The binomial combination had already been used by Carl Linnaeus for the lesser vasa parrot in 1758, and by Johann Friedrich Gmelin for the palm cockatoo in 1788; it was thus invalid even though both other species were already known by different names at the time. Alternate common names include Banks' black cockatoo, Banksian black cockatoo, or simply black cockatoo. Indigenous people of the central Cape York Peninsula have several names for the bird: (minha) pachang in Pakanh; (inh -) inhulg in Uw Oykangand; and (inh -) anhulg in Uw Olkola. (The bracketed prefix (inh- or minha) is a qualifier meaning 'meat' or 'animal'.) Ngarnarrh or karnamarr are terms used by the Kunwinjku of Arnhem Land. In Central Australia, southwest of Alice Springs, the Pitjantjatjara term for the subspecies C. b. samueli is iranti. Karrak is a Noongar term derived from the call for the southwestern race C. b. naso. In the language of the Bungandidj of south-eastern South Australia and western Victoria this bird was called treen.

=== Classification ===
The red-tailed black cockatoo's closest relative is the glossy black cockatoo; the two species form the subgenus Calyptorhynchus within the genus of the same name. They are distinguished from the other black cockatoos of the subgenus Zanda by their significant sexual dimorphism and calls of the juveniles; one a squeaking begging call, the other a vocalization when swallowing food.

A 1999 mtDNA phylogenetic study of cockatoos utilizing among others, the red-tailed black cockatoo supported the hypotheses that cockatoos originated in Australia before the Paleogene and Neogene periods (66 mya, marking the end of the Mesozoic, to 2.6 mya) and that the genus Cacatua diversified in two separate radiations to the islands of Indonesia, New Guinea, and the South Pacific. It concluded that the first extant cockatoo to diverge from the ancestral cockatoos was the palm cockatoo, followed by a subclade containing the black cockatoos.

A 2008 mitochondrial and nuclear DNA phylogenetic study of the parrots, cockatoos and related taxa by utilizing among others the yellow-tailed black cockatoo, provides confirmatory evidence for a Gondwanaland origin of the ancestral parrots in the Cretaceous period, and an Australasia divergence of the ancestral cockatoos from the parrots in either late Cretaceous (66 mya) or Paleogene (45 mya) periods depending on baseline assumptions.

Five subspecies are recognised; they differ mainly in the size and shape of the beak, the overall bird size and female colouration:

- C. b. banksii is found in Queensland and, rarely, in far northern New South Wales; it is the largest subspecies by overall body size and has a moderate-sized bill. It merges with subspecies macrorhynchus around the Gulf of Carpentaria. It has disappeared from much of its former range in northern New South Wales and southeast Queensland.
- C. b. graptogyne, (Endangered) known as the south-eastern red-tailed black cockatoo, is found in southwestern Victoria and southeastern South Australia in an area bordered by Mount Gambier to the west, Portland to the south, Horsham to the northeast and Bordertown to the north. The smallest of the five subspecies, it was only recognised as distinct in the 1980s. It is predominantly dependent on stands of Eucalyptus baxteri (brown stringybark), Eucalyptus camaldulensis (river redgum) and Allocasuarina luehmannii (buloke) for feeding and nesting. These tree species have been all threatened by land clearing and most remaining are on private land; possibly only 500–1000 individuals remain. The subspecies and its habitat are the subject of a national recovery plan. In 2007 local landowners are being reimbursed for assisting in regenerating suitable habitat.
- C. b. macrorhynchus, given the name great-billed cockatoo by Mathews, is found across northern Australia. Although thought to be widespread and abundant, this subspecies has been little studied. It is also large and has a large beak, as its subspecific name implies. Females lack red colouration in their tails.
- C. b. naso (Vulnerable) is known as the forest red-tailed black cockatoo and is found in the southwest corner of Western Australia between Perth and Albany. This form has a larger bill, and favours marri (Corymbia (formerly Eucalyptus) calophylla), jarrah (E. marginata) and karri (E. diversicolor). Two of the most significant threats to this subspecies are illegal shooting and feral honeybees.
- C. b. samueli exists in four scattered populations: in central coastal Western Australia from the Pilbara south to the northern Wheatbelt in the vicinity of Northam, and inland river courses in Central Australia, southwestern Queensland and the upper Darling River system in Western New South Wales. Birds of this subspecies are generally smaller with smaller bills than the nominate banksii.

== Description ==
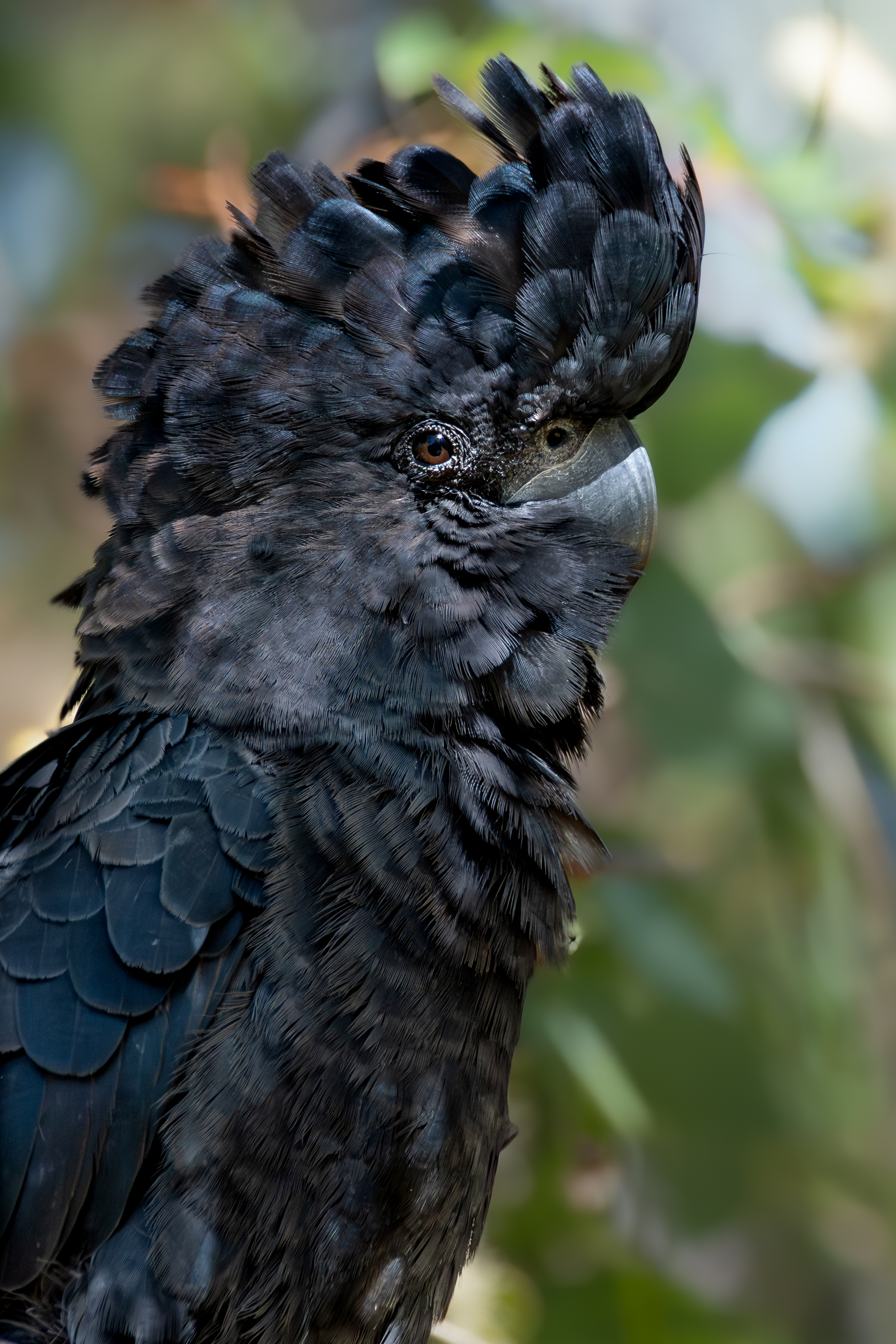
Adult male C.b. naso, Kings Park, Western Australia

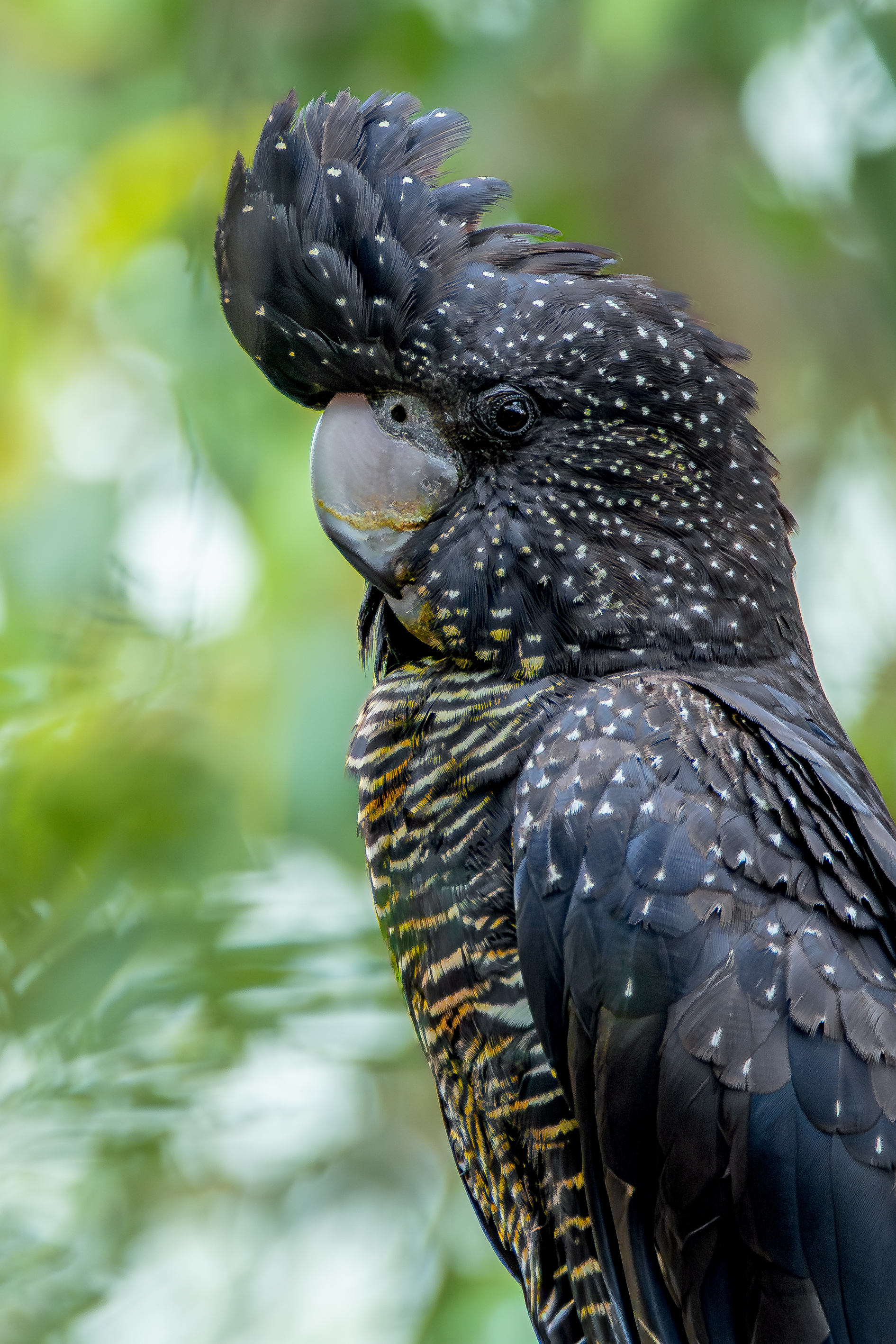
Adult female C.b. naso, Perth Hills, Western Australia

Red-tailed black cockatoos are around 60 centimetres (24 in) in length and sexually dimorphic. The male's plumage is all black with a prominent black crest made up of elongated feathers from the forehead and crown. The bill is dark grey. The tail is also black with two lateral bright red panels. Females are black with yellow-orange stripes in the tail and chest, and yellow grading to red spots on the cheeks and wings. The bill is pale and horn-coloured. The underparts are barred with fine yellow over a black base. Male birds weigh between 670 and 920 grams (1.48 and 2.03 lb), while females weigh slightly less at 615–870 grams (1.356–1.918 lb). In common with other cockatoos and parrots, red-tailed black cockatoos have zygodactyl feet, two toes facing forward and two backward, that allow them to grasp objects with one foot while standing on the other, for feeding and manipulation. Black cockatoos are almost exclusively left-footed (along with nearly all other cockatoos and most parrots).

Juvenile red-tailed black cockatoos resemble females until puberty, which occurs around four years of age, but have paler yellow barred underparts. As the birds reach maturity, males gradually replace their yellow tail feathers with red ones; the complete process takes around four years.

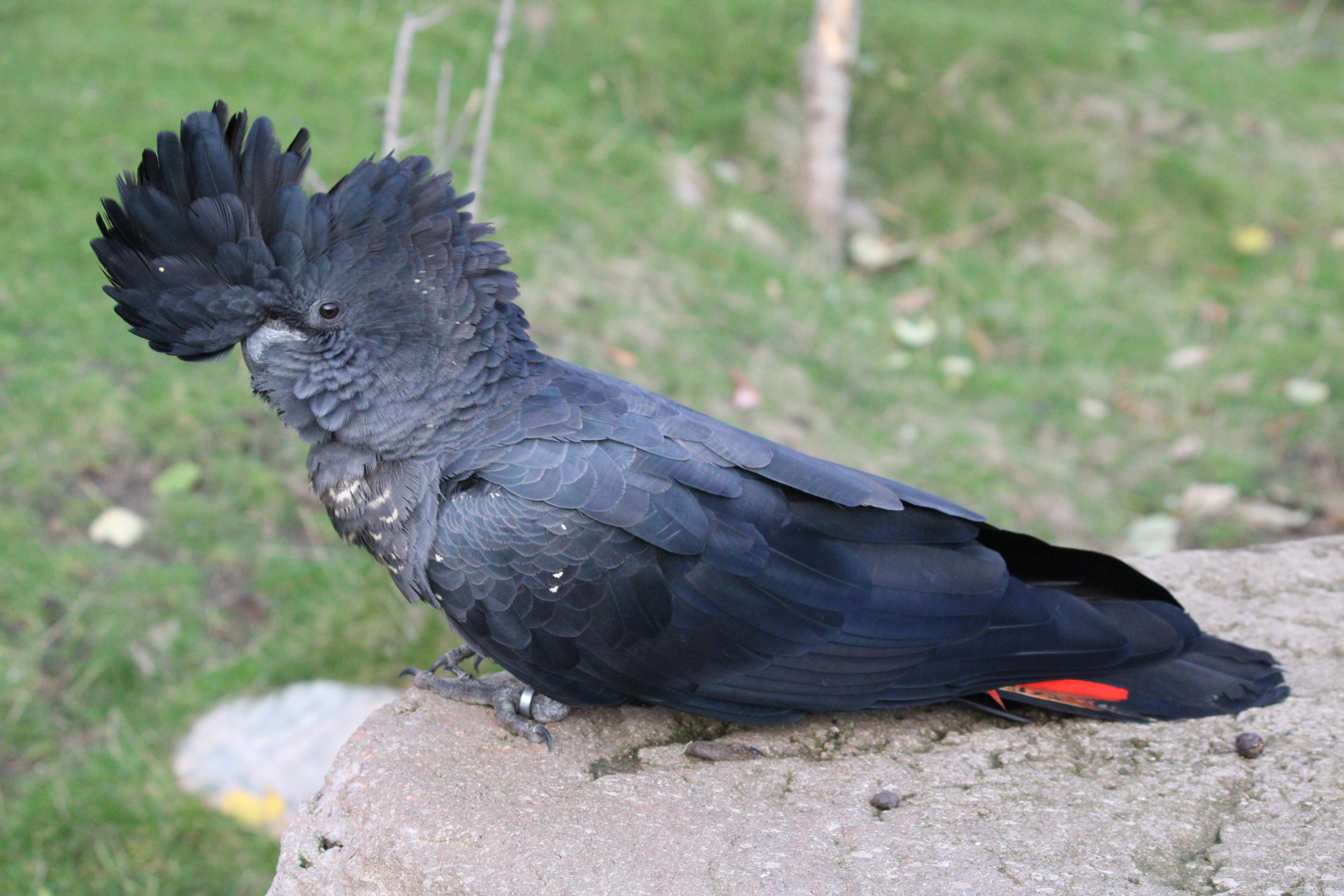
Captive male at Copenhagen Zoo, Denmark

As with other cockatoos, the red-tailed black cockatoo can be very long-lived in captivity; in 1938, ornithologist Neville Cayley reported one over fifty years old at Taronga Zoo. Another bird residing at London and Rotterdam Zoos was 45 years and 5 months of age when it died in 1979.

Several calls of red-tailed black cockatoos have been recorded. The bird's contact call is a rolling metallic krur-rr or kree, which may carry long distances and is always given while flying; its alarm call is sharp. Displaying males vocalize a sequence of soft growling followed by a repetitive kred-kred-kred-kred.

== Distribution and habitat ==
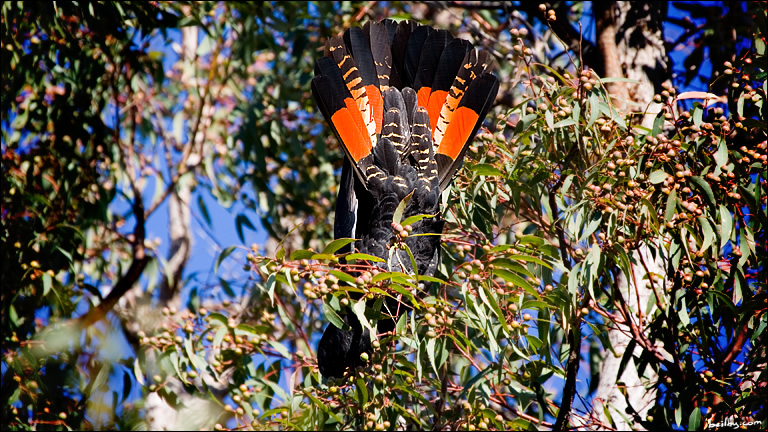
Red-tailed black cockatoo (juvenile male), Darling Scarp, Roleystone, south-west Western Australia

The red-tailed black cockatoo principally occurs across the drier parts of Australia. It is widespread and abundant in a broad band across the northern half of the country, where it has been considered an agricultural pest, with more isolated distribution in the south. It is found in a wide variety of habitats, from shrublands and grasslands through eucalypt, sheoak and Acacia woodlands, to dense tropical rainforests. The bird is dependent on large, old eucalypts for nesting hollows, although the specific gums used vary in different parts of the country.

Cockatoos are not wholly migratory, but they do exhibit regular seasonal movements in different parts of Australia. In the northern parts of the Northern Territory, they largely leave areas of high humidity in the summer wet season. In other parts of the country cockatoo seasonal movements tend to follow food sources, a pattern recorded in Northern Queensland, and New South Wales. In southwest Western Australia, both extant subspecies appear to have a north–south pattern; northwards after breeding in the case of subspecies naso, while movements by subspecies samueli in the wheatbelt can be irregular and unrelated to the seasons.

== Behaviour ==
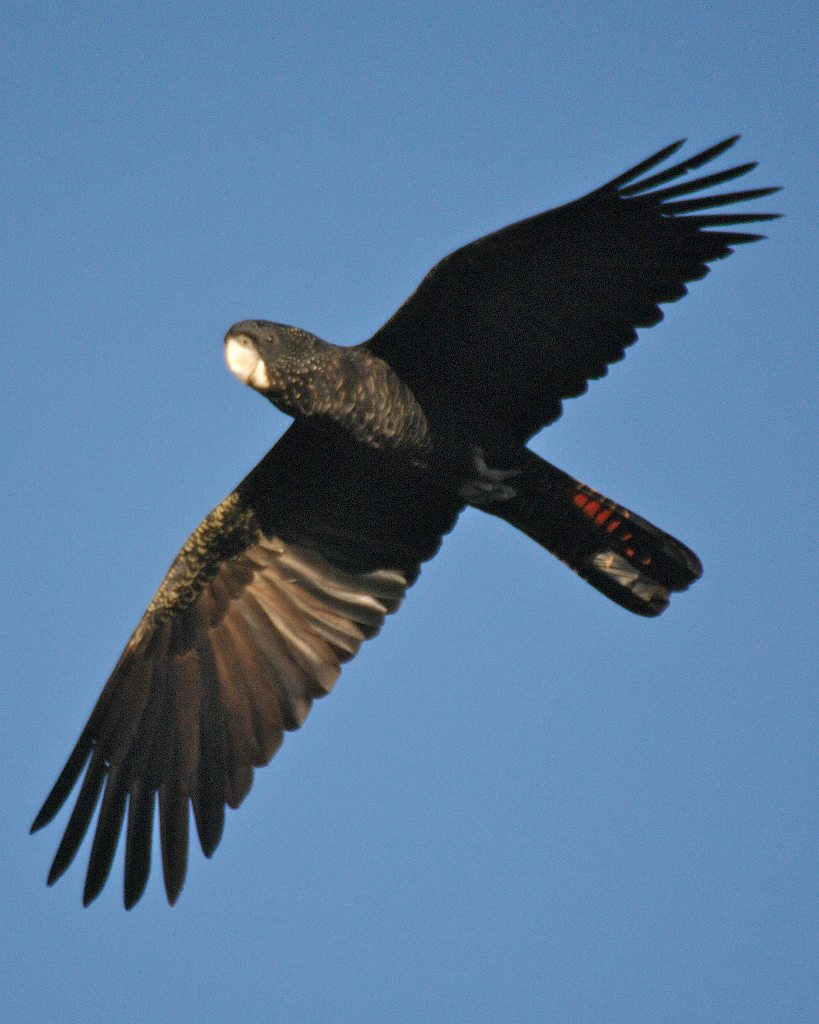
In flight

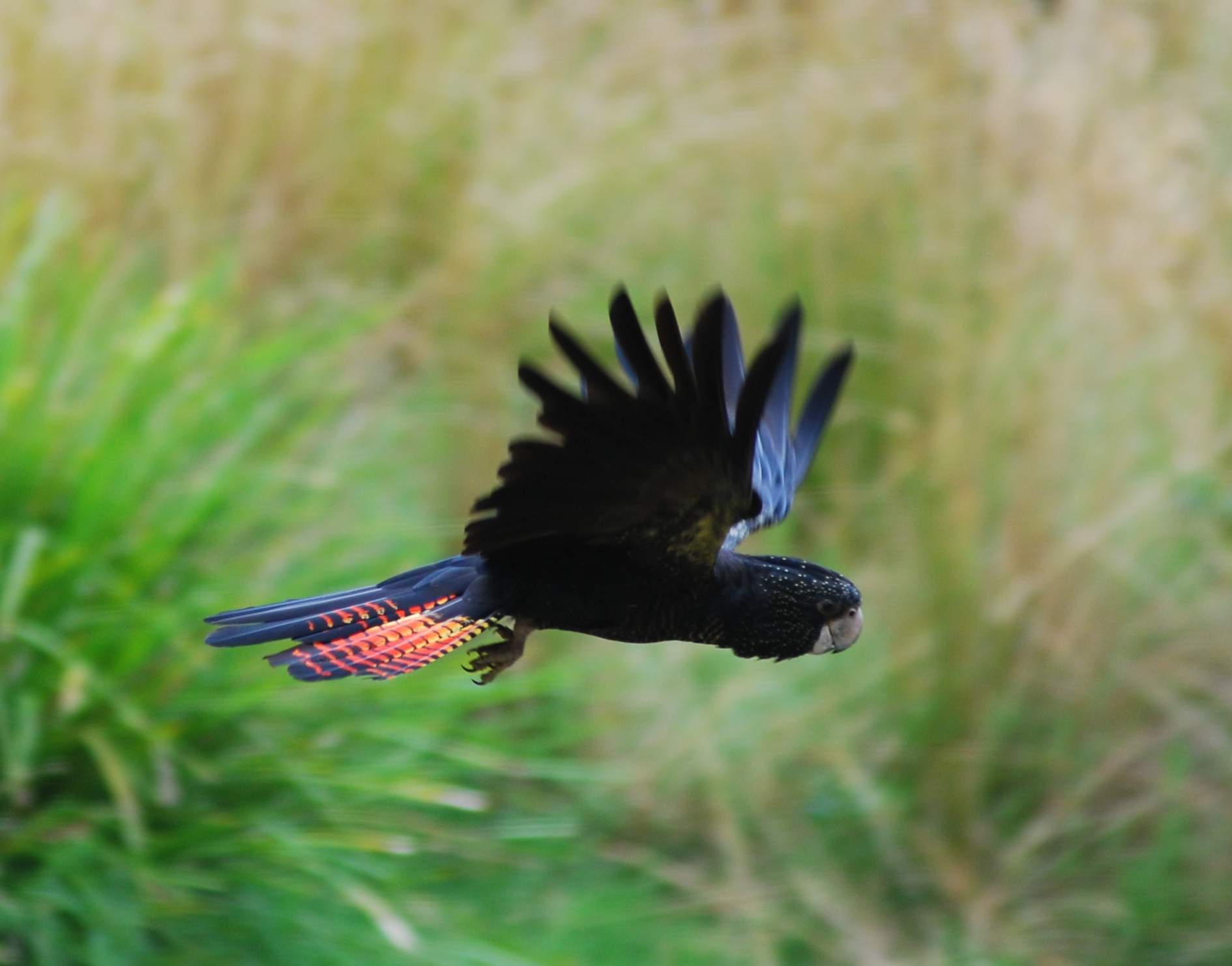
Red-tailed black cockatoo in flight, Healesville Sanctuary

Red-tailed black cockatoos are diurnal, raucous and noisy, and are often seen flying high overhead in small flocks, sometimes mixed with other cockatoos. Flocks of up to 500 birds are generally only seen in the north or when the birds are concentrated at some food source. Otherwise, they are generally rather shy of humans. In northern and central Australia, birds may feed on the ground, while the two southern subspecies, graptogyne and naso, are almost exclusively arboreal. They tend to fly rather slowly with intermittent deep flapping wingbeats, markedly different from the shallow wingbeats of the similar glossy black cockatoo. They also often fly at considerable height.

=== Breeding ===
The male red-tailed black cockatoo courts by puffing up crest and cheek feathers, and hiding the beak; it then sings and struts, ending in a jump and a flash of red tail feathers toward the female who will most often reply by defensively biting him. Breeding generally takes place from May to September except in the case of the South-eastern subspecies, which nests during summer (December to February). Pairs of the subspecies samueli in the Wheatbelt region of Western Australia may produce two broods, while those of South-eastern subspecies only produce one. Nesting takes place in large vertical tree hollows of tall trees. Isolated trees are generally chosen, so birds can fly to and from them relatively unhindered. The same tree may be used for many years. Hollows can be 1 to 2 metres (3–7 ft) deep and 0.25–0.5 metres (10–20 in) wide, with a base of woodchips. A clutch consists of one or two white, lustreless eggs, although the second chick is in most cases neglected and perishes in infancy.

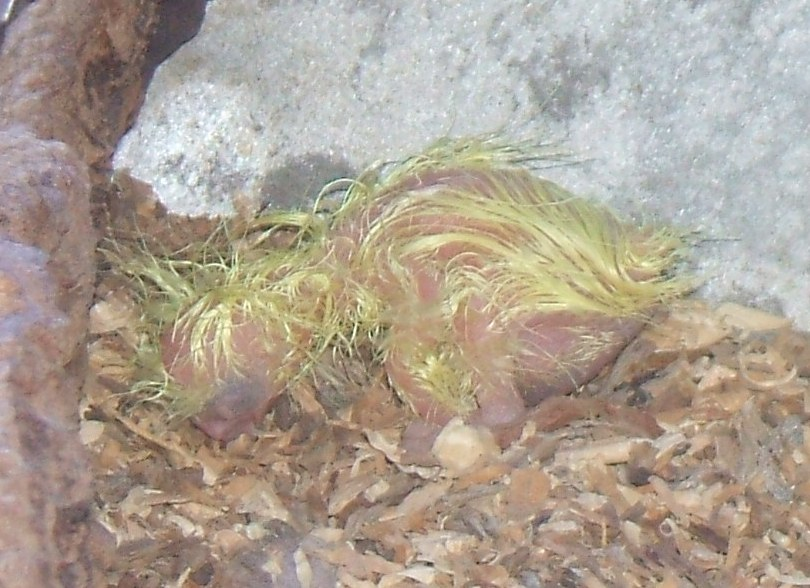
Chick at 1 hour old

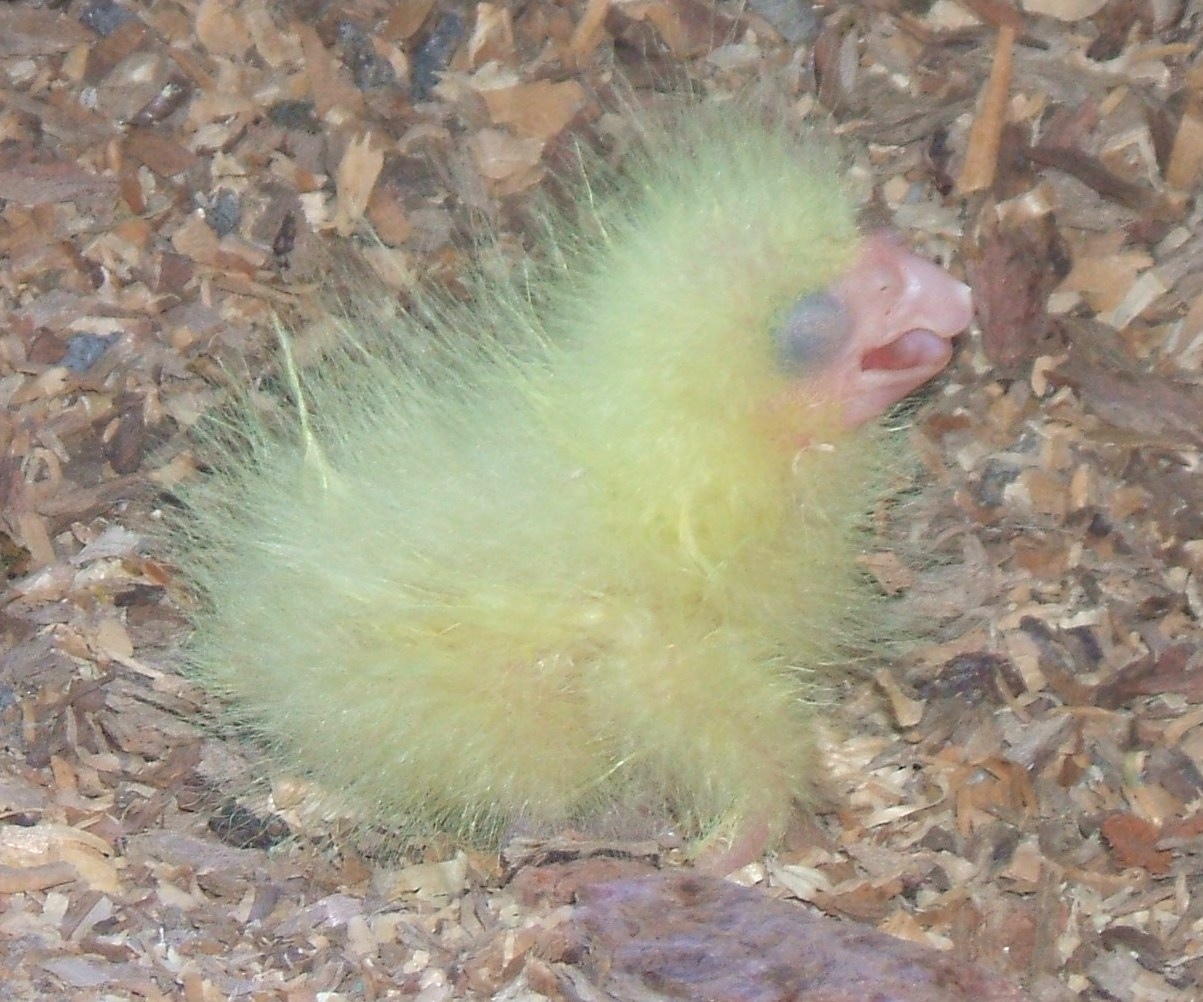
Chick at 1 day old

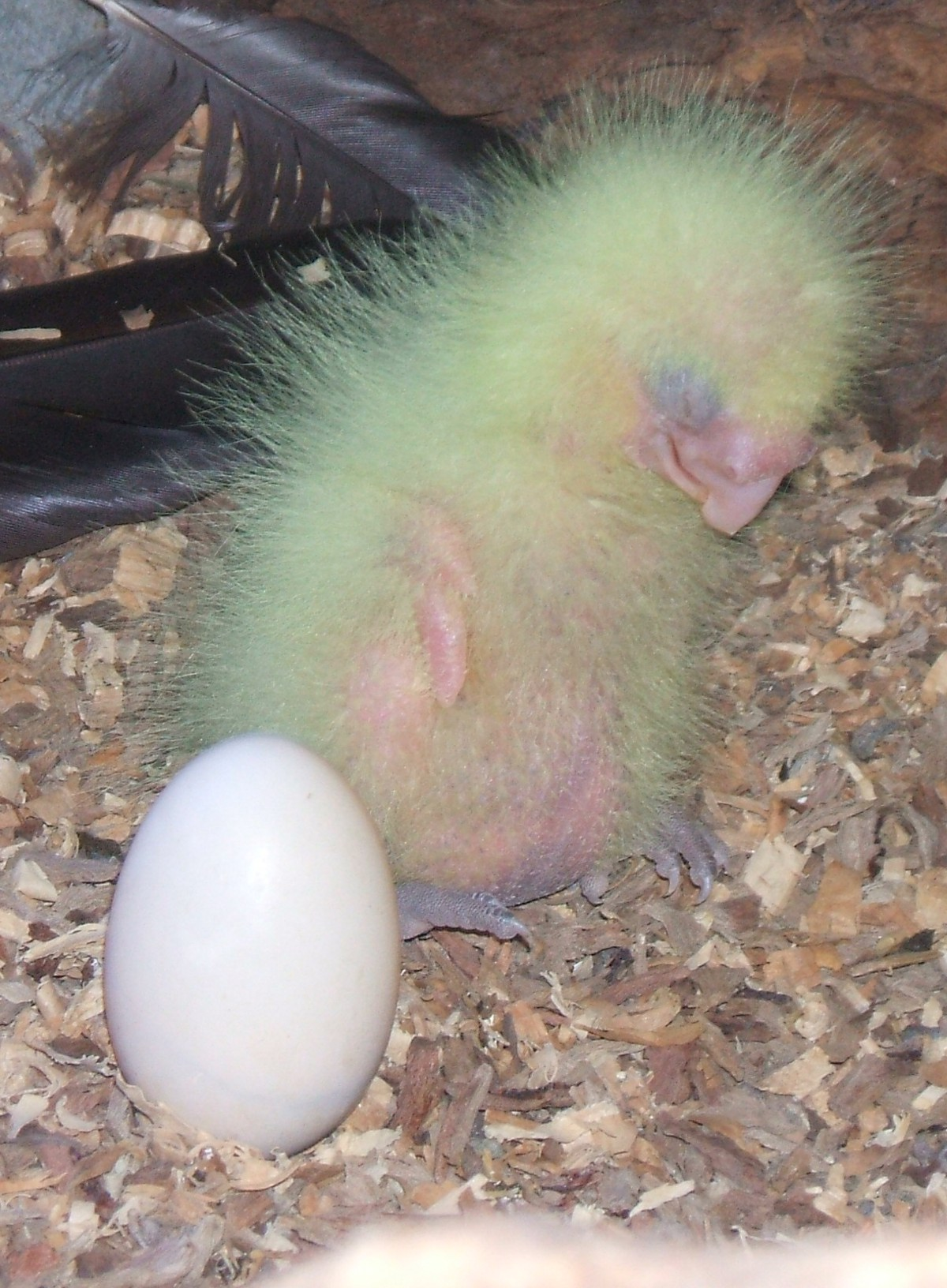
Chick at 1 week old

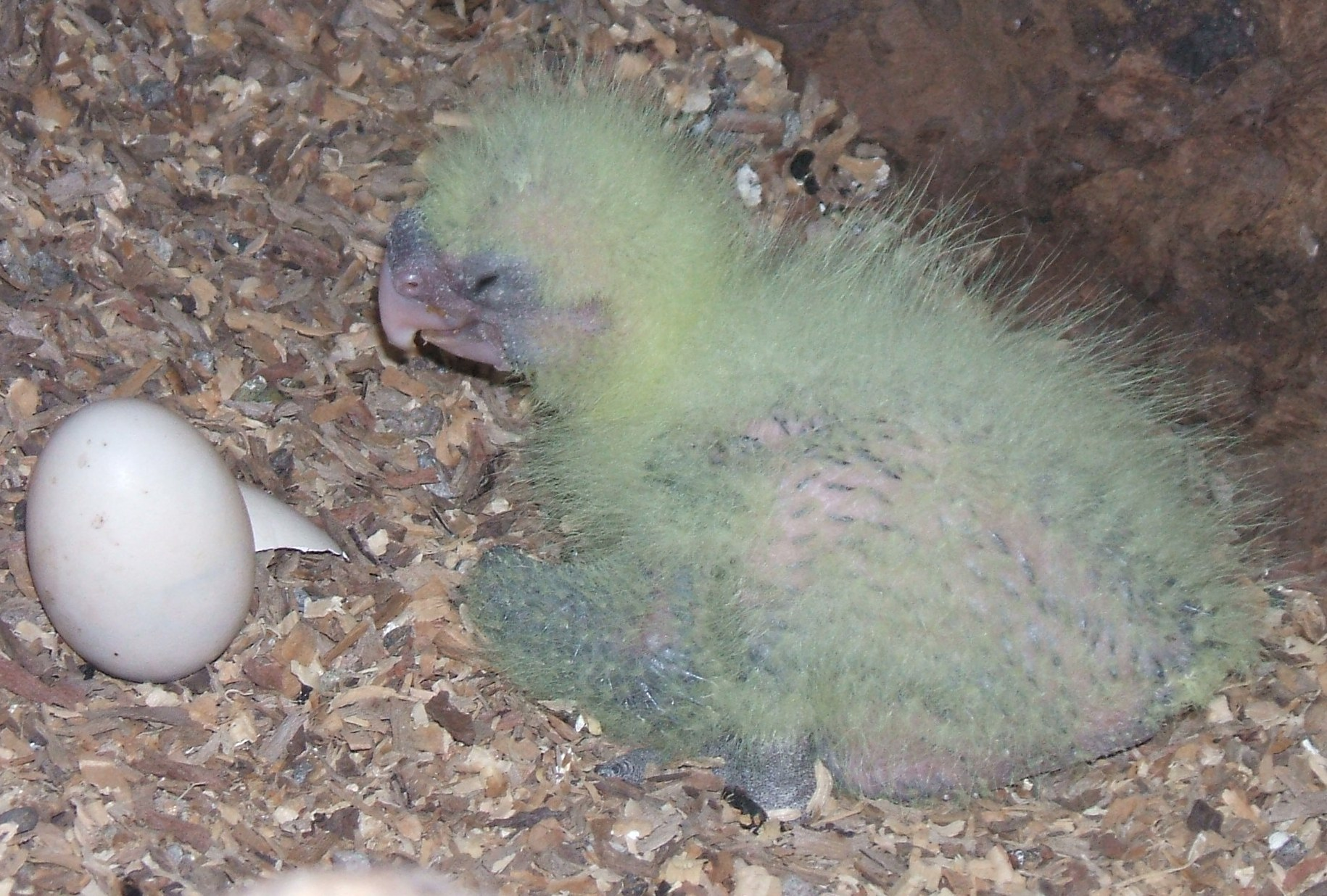
Chick at 2 weeks old

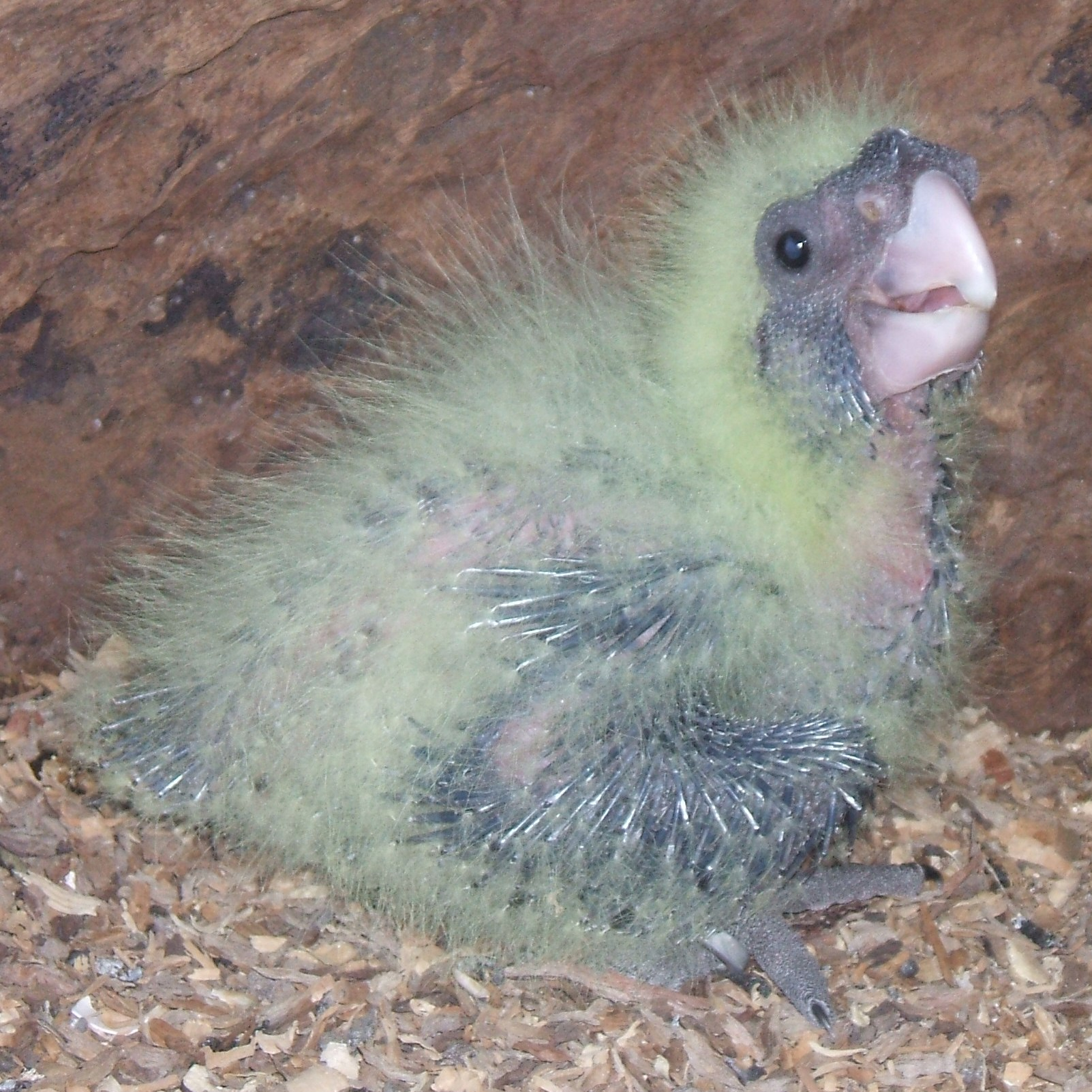
Chick at 3 weeks old

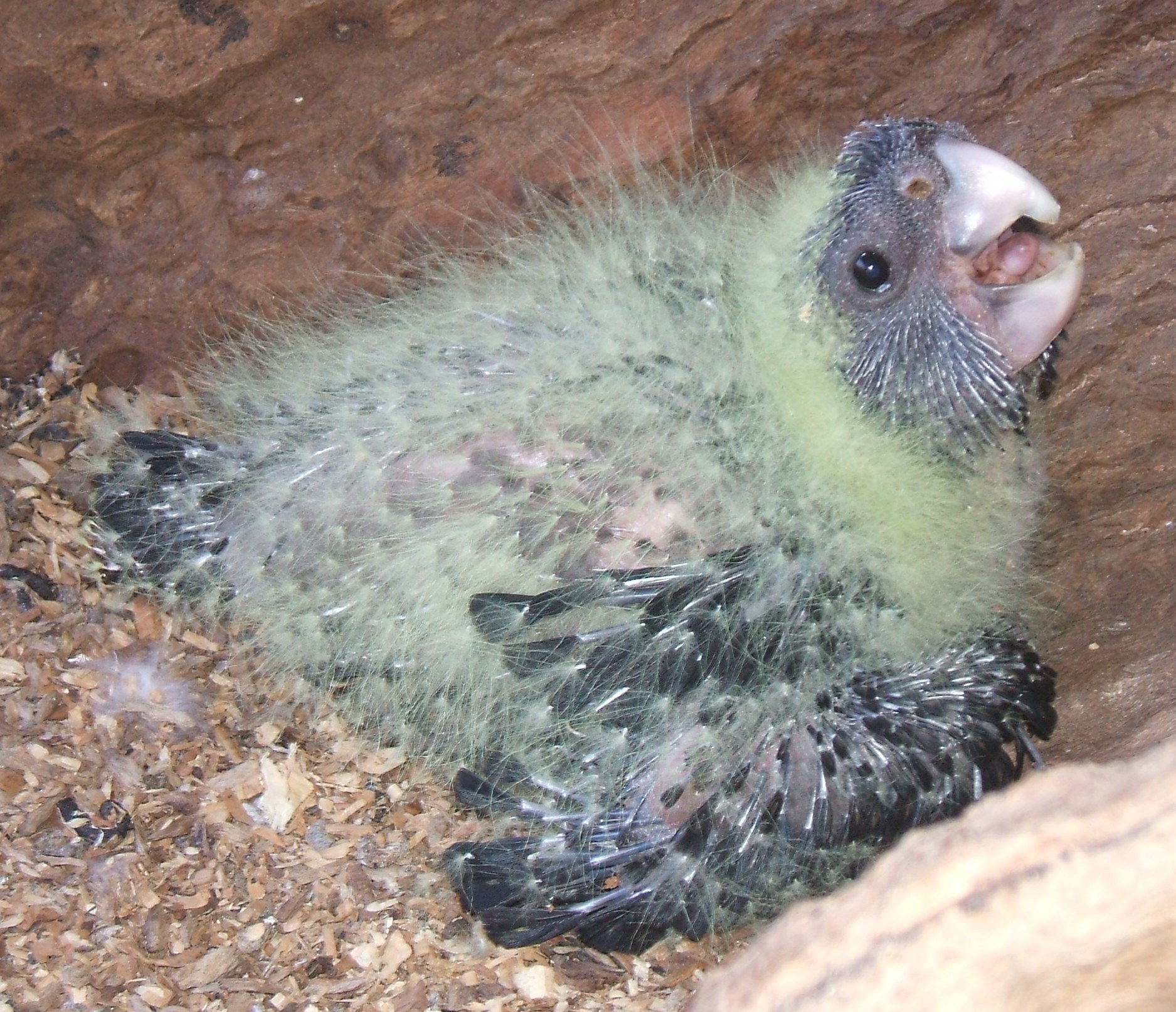
Chick at 4 weeks old

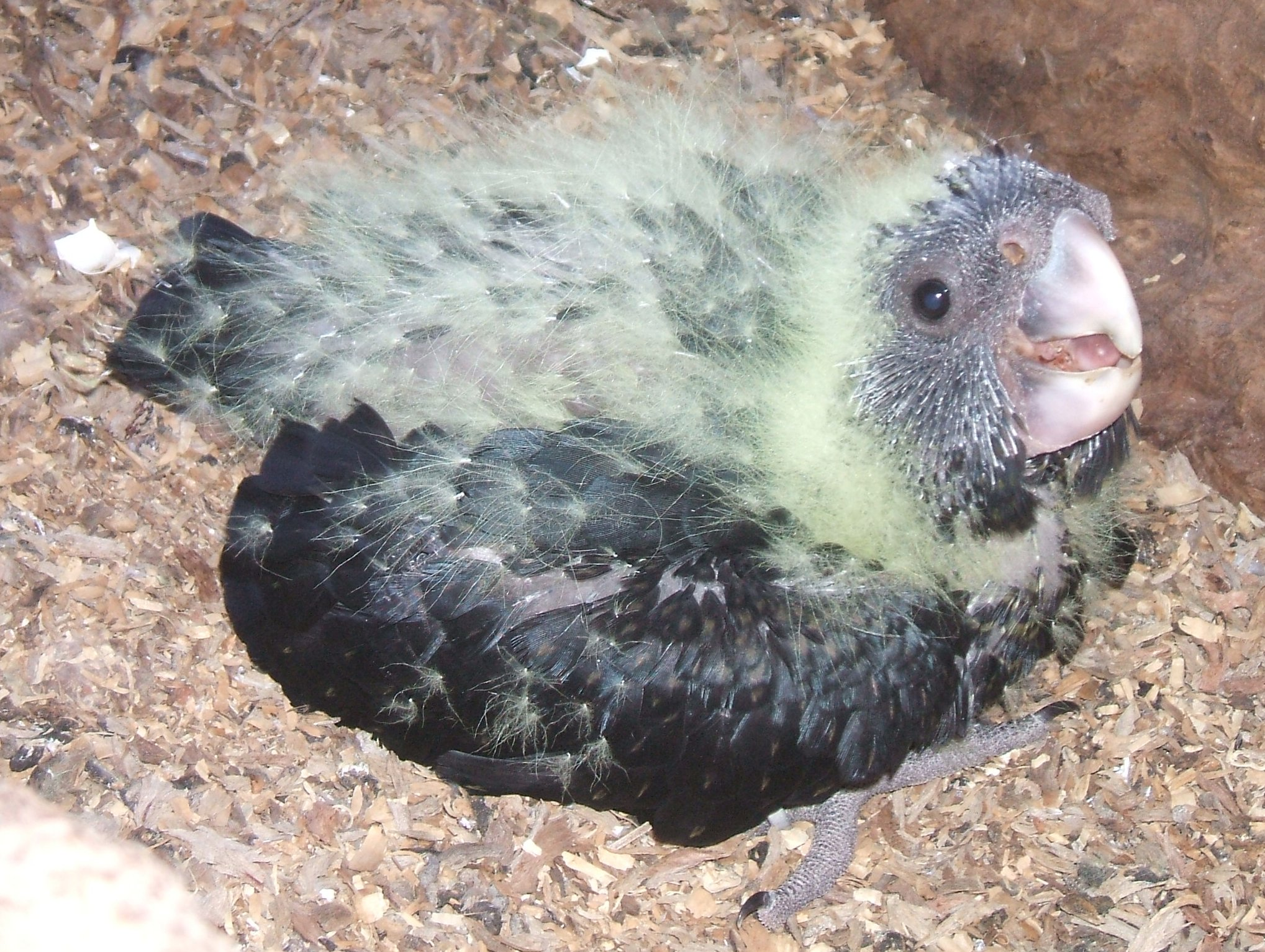
Chick at 5 weeks old

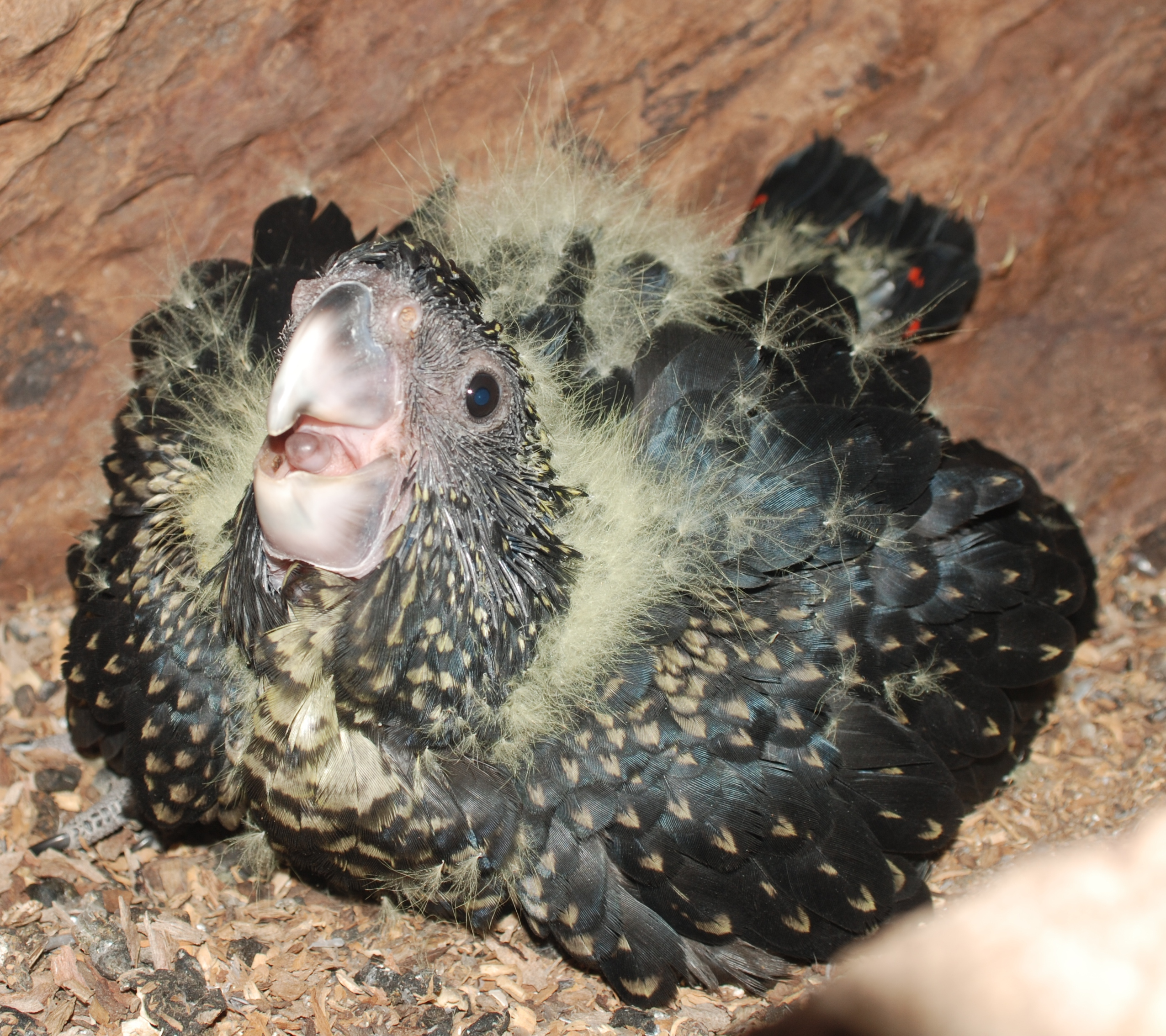
Chick at 6 weeks old

=== Feeding ===
Male (left) and female (right) feeding on gumnuts.

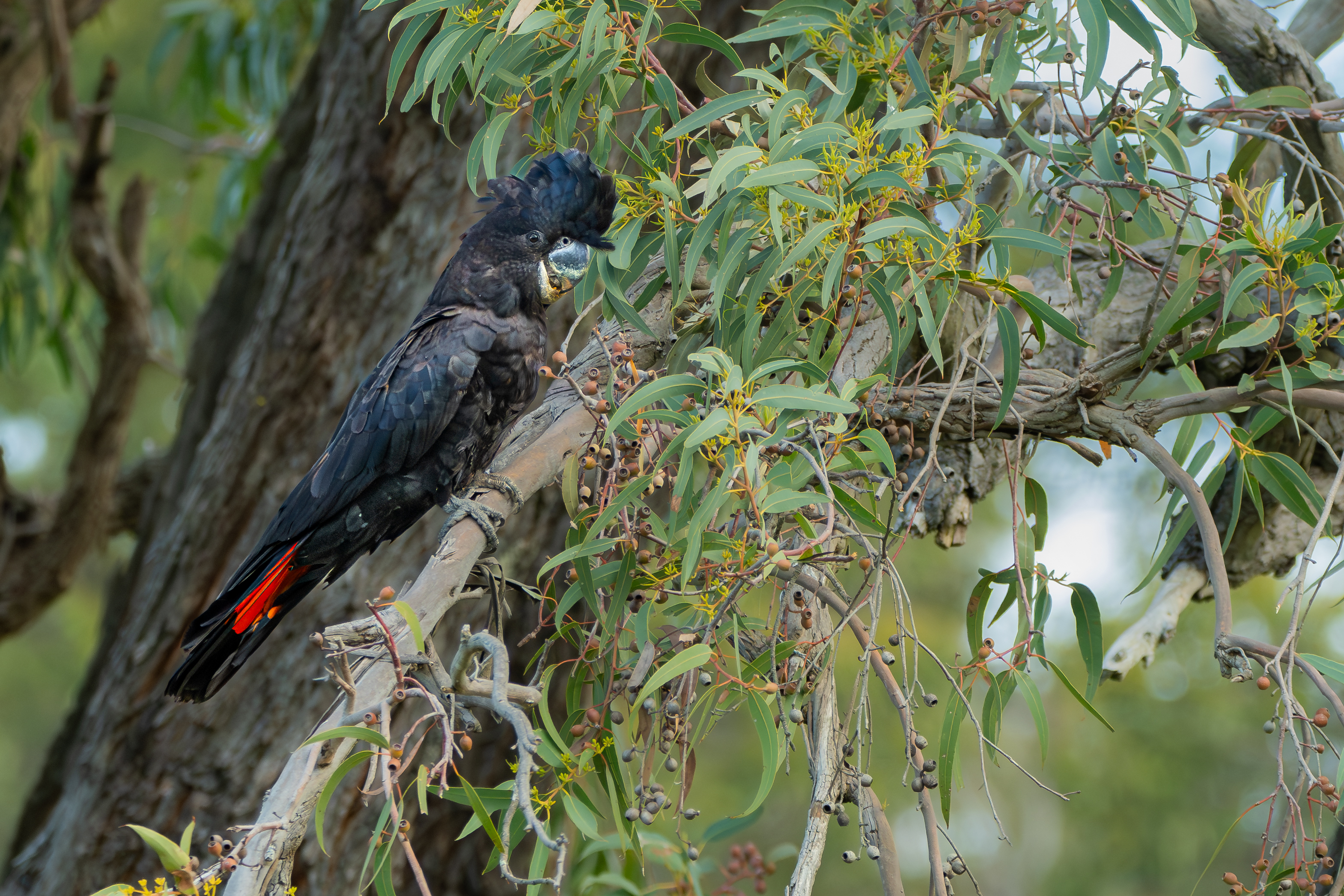

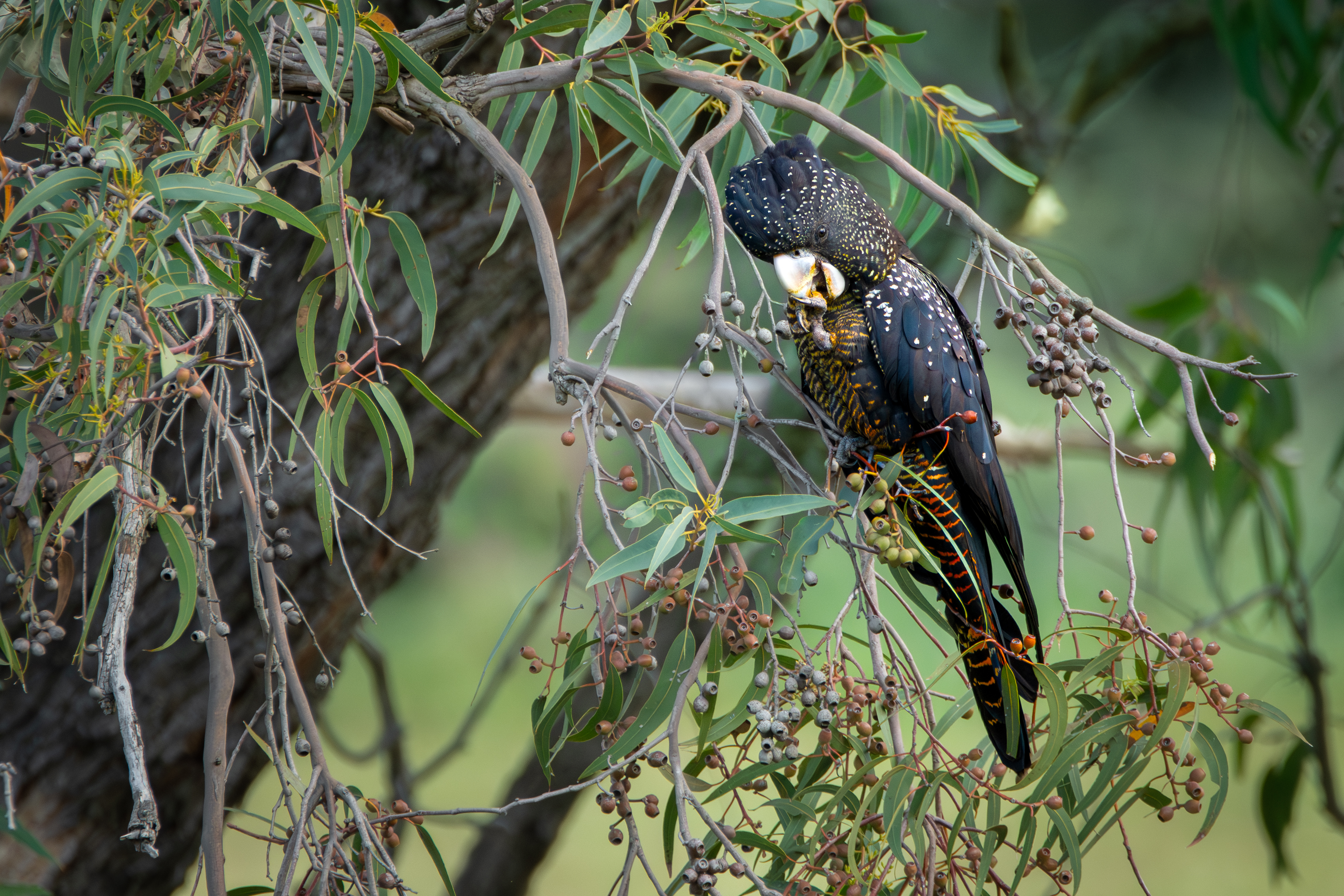

Although red-tailed black cockatoos feed on a wide variety of native and introduced grains, the mainstay of their diet is eucalyptus seeds. There is a specific relationship between the species and larger-fruited species of gums. These vary across Australia but include the marri in Southwest Western Australia, Darwin woollybutt E. miniata across the north of the country, E. baxteri in Victoria and the bloodwood species Corymbia polycarpa and C. intermedia in Queensland. Cockatoos bite off branchlets with clusters of seed capsules, then hold them with their feet while chewing and harvesting seeds before littering the ground with debris. Among other seeds and nuts consumed are those of Acacia, Allocasuarina, Banksia, Grevillea and Hakea, as well as berries and fruits. They may also consume insects, but very rarely. Cockatoos have adapted to eating some introduced plants such as the doublegee (Emex australis). There is some evidence of consumption of wild radish (Raphanus raphanistrum), wild turnip (Brassica tournefortii) and melon (Citrullus or Cucumis). Red-tailed black cockatoos have been implicated as agricultural pests of peanut and other crops at Lakeland Downs in Far North Queensland. Here the cockatoos, in flocks of up to several hundred birds, have learned to sever the peanut plants above ground level before pulling the peanuts out of the ground by their stems and shelling them. They also damage electrical cables on pivot irrigators.

== Conservation status ==
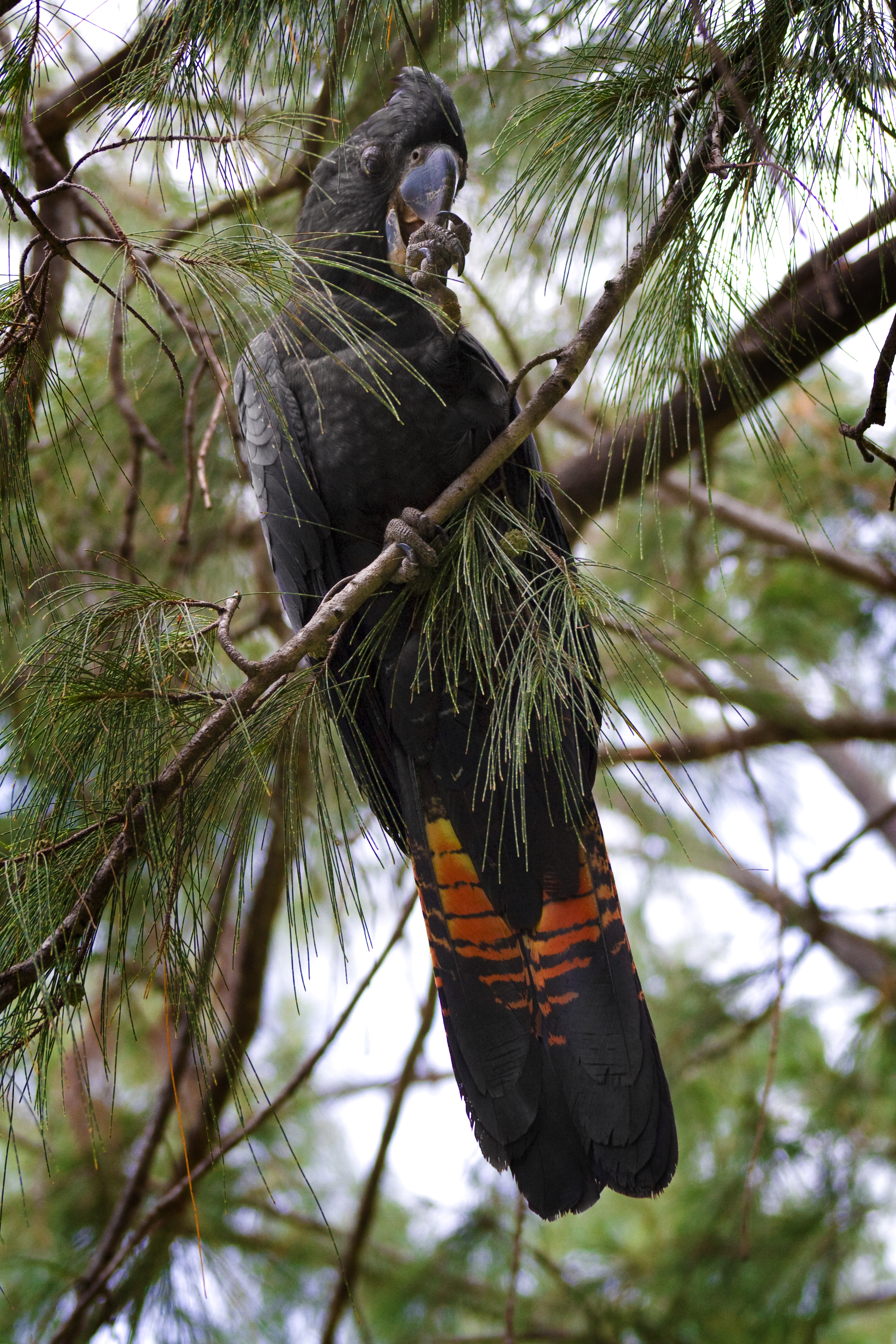
A juvenile male red-tailed black cockatoo feasting on the seeds of a Casuarina tree on McMinn St, Darwin, Northern Territory, Australia

The red-tailed black cockatoo is protected under the Australian Environment Protection and Biodiversity Conservation Amendment (Wildlife Protection) Act 2001. These birds are listed internationally under Appendix II of CITES, which allows international trade in live wild-caught and captive-bred specimens, if such exports are not detrimental to wild populations. However, the current Australian restrictions on commercial exports from Australia are not imposed by CITES. C. b. graptogyne is also specifically listed as endangered on the Australian Environment Protection and Biodiversity Conservation Act 1999.

Status of the red-tailed black cockatoo as a species, and as a subspecies, also varies from state to state within Australia. For example:

- The south-eastern red-tailed black cockatoo subspecies C. b. graptogyne is listed as endangered on Schedule 7 of the National Parks and Wildlife Act 1972 of South Australia. and is the smallest of the species. Though a June 2012 count of approximately 1500 individuals is a notable increase from the 2007 count of just 1000, it remains in danger of extinction.
- C. b. graptogyne is also listed as threatened on the Victorian Flora and Fauna Guarantee Act 1988. Under this Act, an Action Statement for the recovery and future management of this species has been prepared. However, it should also be noted that the red-tailed black cockatoo is listed under this Act under its previous Latin name, Calyptorhynchus magnificus. On the 2007 advisory list of threatened vertebrate fauna in Victoria, this subspecies is listed as endangered.
- The red-tailed black cockatoo is listed as vulnerable on the NSW Threatened Species Conservation Act 1995

Like many Australian cockatoos and parrots, the red-tailed black cockatoo is threatened by the thriving illegal trade in bird smuggling. High demand and high transit mortality mean that many more birds are taken from the wild than actually sold.

In 1997, the Northern Territory Government's Department of Natural Resources, Environment and The Arts (now defunct) proposed a plan for management of the trade in eggs and nestlings of C. b. macrorhynchus. To date the plan has not been implemented. (Note: Proposed C. b. macrorhynchus quota plan: This subspecies, which is relatively abundant in the territory's northern part, was thought plentiful enough to sustain limited harvesting of young for commercial purposes. This involved the protection of selected 'harvest zones' and the capping of harvest at 600 eggs or hatchlings per year; all captive birds were to be marked with microchips. Separate permits would be issued for collection and export, as well as keeping one as a pet. The Northern Territory government's plan for a restricted harvest was supported by a group of biologists who argued that a 'do-nothing approach' had failed to address illegal trafficking and that limited public funds were available for species or habitat conservation. They felt that a catastrophic collapse in the Northern Territory population was highly unlikely, and that the cockatoo would benefit from increased awareness and a greater understanding of its ecology by local landowners. There would also be a valuable contribution to the science of sustainable utilisation of wild resources. Other experts raised serious concerns with the management plan; the famed psittacine biologist Joseph Forshaw opposed it on several grounds. He expressed concerns that, given the birds' long lifespan, recruitment problems may be masked for many years, by which time recovery of the cockatoo population may be impossible. He also feared that increasing supply would lower prices and hence lower profitability for those involved. Other groups such as the Avicultural Federation of Australia (AFA) raised concerns that populations may be aging due to lack of breeding sites, so they may be especially vulnerable to loss of juveniles which, again, may not be apparent for many years. They also feared that since adults mate for life, a bird whose partner was taken may not mate again.) The Australian Senate inquiry into the Commercial Utilisation of Australian Native Wildlife concluded in early 1998 that routine capture and commercial use of adult wild birds should be prohibited.

The bird is part of an annual census, the Great Cocky Count, that has been held every year since 2009 to track the population change of red-tailed and other black cockatoos.

== Aviculture ==
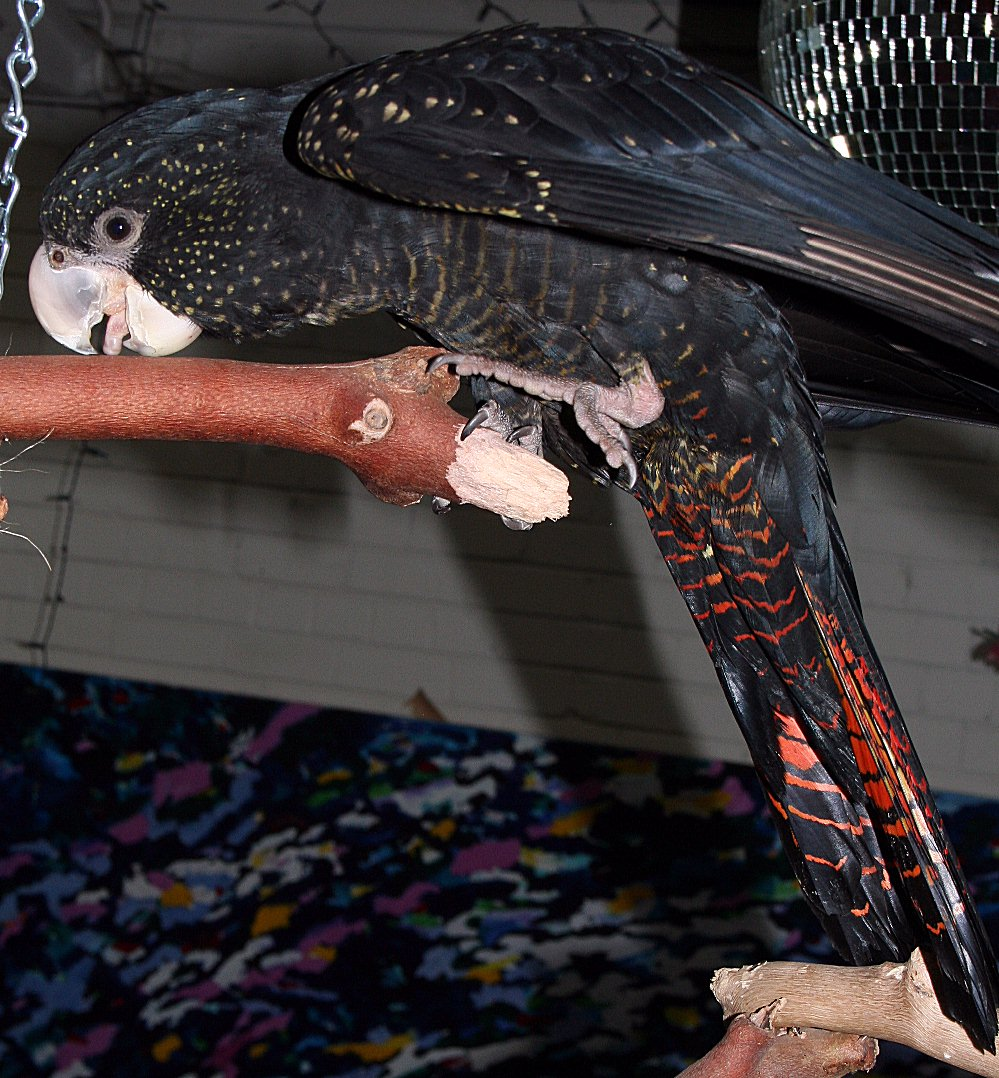
Adult tame female of subspecies samueli

In the late 1990s, red-tailed black cockatoos fetched prices of $1750 in Australia and $8900 (~US$6000) overseas. Hand-raised birds can be bought for anywhere between $15,000 to $40,000 in the United States, where they are seldom seen in aviculture. Hand-reared birds are able to learn a few words and can be quite affectionate, although males may become imprinted and unlikely to breed. The red-tailed black cockatoo is the most commonly seen of the black cockatoos in captivity, and can be hardy and long-lived if given plenty of space. Until now, most birds in captivity have been of subspecies C. b. banksii and C. b. samueli. Birds were often previously bred without much attention to subspecies of origin. However, with an increase in interest in conservation, more aviculturists are concerned about maintaining the integrity of the separate subspecies in cultivation, and so avoid crossbreeding.

The birds breed easily in captivity and can lay eggs every 3 weeks between February and November. Once the female has one egg in her nest, she will not lay another. An egg takes about 30 days to hatch. The eyes of the young open around 3 weeks and the yellow down will show black pin feathers at about 6 weeks. The best time for hand raising is at about 10 weeks when their black feathers are in place but the tail feathers are still short. Young birds fledge after about 4 months and both sexes have the colouring of their mother. Mature male birds will become aggressive to young male birds at puberty (4 years); they must be separated if caged.

Captive breeding guidelines may be found in Husbandry Guidelines for the Red-tailed Black Cockatoo (Bennett, 2008).

== Cultural depictions ==
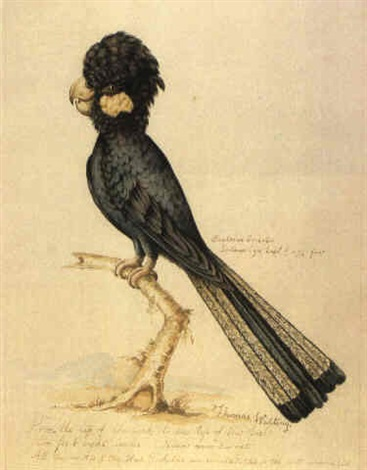
Banksian Cockatoo by Thomas Watling, the first professional European artist to paint in New South Wales

- A red-tailed black cockatoo, named Karak, was the official mascot of the 2006 Commonwealth Games held in Melbourne. Promotion coincided with an implementation of initiatives to ensure the survival of the south-eastern subspecies graptogyne, as well as increased environmental awareness at the games.
- A traditional story from western Arnhem Land tells of Black Cockatoo and her husband Crow, who are Bird-people, sprouting black feathers after becoming afflicted with a sickness from across the sea to the north. In fear of being buried underground, they transform into birds and fly high in the sky.
- In the folklore of the Tiwi people, the red-tailed black cockatoo is said to accompany the dead to heaven.

== Cited texts ==
- Forshaw, Joseph M.; William T. Cooper (2002). Australian Parrots (3rd ed.). Robina: Alexander Editions. ISBN 978-0-9581212-0-0.
- Flegg, Jim (2002). Birds of Australia: Photographic Field Guide. Sydney: Reed New Holland. ISBN 978-1-876334-78-9.
- Lendon, Alan H. (1973). Australian Parrots in Field and Aviary. Angus & Robertson. ISBN 978-0-207-12424-2.
- Garnett, S. (1993) Threatened and Extinct Birds of Australia. RAOU. National Library, Canberra. ISSN 0812-8014
