= Korak =

Korak may refer to:

- Korak people, indigenous people of Siberia
- Korak (character) – the son of Tarzan
- Korak, Semnan, Iran
- Korak, Nepal
- Korak, Pakistan

== See also ==
- Karak (disambiguation)
- Korah
