= List of Australian sporting mascots =

Many sporting mascots used as mascots and characters by clubs and teams in Australia and New Zealand are similar to those used around the world. There are, however, quite a number that are unique to these two nations.

The following is a list of notable mascots and characters created specifically for advertising purposes in Australia and New Zealand, listed alphabetically by the club or team they represent.

== Australian Football ==
=== Australian Football League ===
In 2003, the Australian Football League standardised the club mascots into the Mascot Manor theme. Some, however, have since been replaced.

- Adelaide - Claude "Curls" Crow
- Brisbane Lions - Roy the Lion (formerly Bernie 'Gabba' Vegas)
- Carlton - Captain Carlton
- Collingwood - Jock "One Eye" McPie
- Essendon - Moz "Skeeta" Reynolds
- Fremantle - Johnny "The Doc" Docker (formerly Grinder)
- Geelong - Half Cat (formerly 'Slammin' Sam Tomcat)
- Gold Coast - Sunny Ray (formerly Gary "GC" Clifford)
- Greater Western Sydney - G-man
- Hawthorn - Hudson "Hawka" Knights
- Melbourne - Checker, Chuck, Cheeky, and Flash (formerly Ronald "Dee" Mann)
- North Melbourne - Kanga (formerly Barry "Bruiser" Cracker)
- Port Adelaide - Tommy "Thunda" Power
- Richmond - Tiger "Stripes" Dyer (formerly Tiggy)
- St Kilda - Trevor "Saint" Kilda
- Sydney - Syd "Swannie" Skilton (formerly Syd "Cyggy" Skilton)
- West Coast - Rick "The Rock" Eagle
- Western Bulldogs – Woofer, Butch, and Barkly

=== Australian Football League Women's ===
Some of the AFLW clubs, such as the Adelaide Crows, use the same mascot as the men’s teams. Those with a separate mascot are listed below.

- Brisbane Lions - Auroara
- Collingwood – Maggie
- Carlton – Navy Nina
- Essendon – Skye
- Fremantle – Jenny Docker
- Geelong – Clawdia Cat
- Gold Coast – Skye
- Greater Western Sydney - Gigi
- Hawthorn – Hawkette
- Melbourne – Daisy
- North Melbourne – Ruby
- Richmond – Sash
- St Kilda – Angelica
- West Coast – Rosie
- Western Bulldogs – Roxie

== Cricket ==
=== Big Bash League ===
- Adelaide Strikers - Smash and Summer
- Brisbane Heat - Heater
- Hobart Hurricanes - Captain hurricane
- Melbourne Renegades - Sledge (Cricketer from the year 2020) and Willow
- Melbourne Stars - Starman and starlett
- Perth Scorchers - Blaze and Amber
- Sydney Sixers - Syd
- Sydney Thunder - Thor (Formerly Maxiumus)

=== State teams ===
- Victoria Bushrangers - Ned Ranger
- Queensland Bulls - "Rocky" the Five Star Senepol bull

== Rugby League ==
=== National Rugby League ===
- Brisbane Broncos - "Buck"
- Canterbury Bulldogs - "Brutus"
- Canberra Raiders - "Victor" the Viking
- Cronulla Sharks - "Reefy" & "Hammerhead"
- Dolphins - "Phinny" and "Sandy"
- Gold Coast Titans - "Blade"
- Manly-Warringah Sea Eagles - "Egor" the Eagle
- Melbourne Storm - "Boom" and “Storm man”
- Newcastle Knights - "Knytro" and “Novo”
- New Zealand Warriors - "Tiki"
- North Queensland Cowboys - "Bluey" the Cattledog
- Parramatta Eels - "Sparky”,”Sparkles” and “Eric” the Eel
- Penrith Panthers - "Claws" the Panther
- St George Illawarra Dragons - "Scorch"
- South Sydney Rabbitohs - "Rocket" the Bunny & Reggie the Rabbit"
- Sydney Roosters - "Rocky" the Rooster
- Wests Tigers - "Timmy" & "Stripes"

== Rugby Union ==
=== Super Rugby ===
- Western Force - Westy
- Brumbies - Brumby Jack
- New South Wales Waratahs - Tah Man
- Queensland Reds - Rusty

== Soccer ==
=== A League Men ===
- Adelaide United - "Red the Kangaroo"
- Brisbane Roar - "Roary" the Lion
- Central Coast Mariners - "Marvin", "BBQ Sauce" & "Tomato Sauce" (formerly "Captain Yellowbeard" & "Admiral Frederick")
- Gold Coast United - "GC"
- Macarthur FC - "Arthur the Bull"
- Melbourne City Bull, Ram, Whale, and Sailor - (formerly "Ticker")
- Melbourne Victory - "Vic"
- Newcastle Jets - "Benny"
- Perth Glory - "George the Glory Gorilla"
- Sydney FC - "Blue" (formerly "Syd")
- Wellington Phoenix - "Nixie"
- Western Sydney Wanderers - "Sunny" & "Wesley"

=== A League Women ===
- Brisbane Roar - "Rosie" the Lion
- Canberra United - "Travis the Frog"
- Sydney FC - "Skye" (formerly "Sydnee")

== Basketball ==
=== National Basketball League ===
Current Mascots

- Adelaide 36ers - "Murray" the Magpie
- Cairns Taipans - "Joe Blake"
- Melbourne United - "Mr Baller"
- New Zealand Breakers - "Cheeky" the Kea
- Perth Wildcats - "Wilbur" the Wildcat
- Sydney Kings - "The Lion"
- South East Melbourne Phoenix - "Birdman" follow on Instagram
- Tasmania JackJumpers - "Jack"
- Illawarra Hawks - "Tomma" & "Moe"
- Brisbane Bullets - "Boom"

Former Mascots

- Gold Coast Blaze - "Burnie Blaze"
- Melbourne Tigers - "Tigerman"
- Townsville Crocodiles - "100% Croc"
- Brisbane Bullets - "Mushroom"

=== Women's National Basketball League ===
- Perth Lynx - "Layla" the Lynx
- University of Canberra Capitals - "Cappie" the Giraffe

== Other ==
=== Olympic Games ===
- 2000 Summer Olympics - Olly, Syd, Millie and Lizzie (official); Fatso the Fat-Arsed Wombat (unofficial)
- Australian Olympic Committee - Boxing kangaroo

=== Commonwealth Games ===
- 1982 Commonwealth Games - Matilda the kangaroo
- 2004 Commonwealth Youth Games - Ausca the sugar glider
- 2006 Commonwealth Games - Karak the cockatoo
- 2018 Commonwealth Games - Borobi the koala

== See also ==
- List of Australian and New Zealand advertising characters
- List of sports team names and mascots derived from indigenous peoples
