= Karak (surname) =

Karak is a surname found in Indian state of Karnataka, West Bengal, Gujarat, Bihar.
