= Karak (mascot) =

Mascot for the 2006 Commonwealth Games

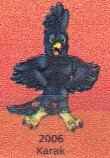
- Karak depicted on a stamp

In-universe information
- Species: Red-tailed black cockatoo
- Gender: Male
- Nationality: Australian

Karak was the mascot for the 2006 Commonwealth Games. He was modelled on a red-tailed black cockatoo, a threatened species within the host country, Australia.

Karak was initially unveiled by John Howard, the Prime Minister of Australia at the time. His backstory states that he came from "Stringy Bark Lane", which was cleared away, causing him grief. He had a grandmother that made seed cakes, a mother that started a family when she was young, two brothers that were shuttlecocks, and a sister that performed well in school. A real red-tailed black cockatoo was named Karak Junior in honor of the mascot. In 2005, the costumed mascot joined with volunteers to count red-tailed black cockatoos in the wild. License plates featuring an image of Karak were sold to raise money for the conservation of red-tailed black cockatoos. In the Athlete's Village at the 2006 Games, a mascot race was held between Karak and the mascots of participating national teams. Plush toys of Karak were also produced and sold.

== See also ==
- List of Australian sporting mascots
- List of Commonwealth Games mascots
