= Atmakaraka =

Significator of the soul's desire in Hindu astrology

Atmakaraka (from Sanskrit atma- 'soul', and karaka- 'significator') is the significator of the soul's desire in Jyotisha (Hindu astrology). The Atmakaraka is either the Sun or one of the planets (as determined by the astrological chart) and has the strongest influence on the subject of the horoscope according to astrologers.

== Karakas ==
In astrology, karakas are the "significators" that determine on which person or thing a planet has influence. Of these karakas, the most important is the Atmakaraka, significator of the soul, which rules the person who is the subject of the horoscope. The Rasi (Zodiac sign) and Nakshatra (lunar mansion) in which the Atmakaraka is placed plays an important role in reading the nature of a subject from their chart. Counted as planets in this system are;

- Ravi (English Sun)
- Chandra (English Moon)
- Kuja (English Mars)
- Budha (English Mercury)
- Guru (English Jupiter)
- Sukra (English Venus)
- Sani (English Saturn)

In some versions, one or both of the following are also included

- Rahu
- Ketu

Rahu and Ketu are "shadow planets", that is, they have no physical existence. They are positioned at the lunar nodes. These have retrograde motion.

In the astrology of Parashara, the assignment of karakas to planets is permanently fixed. In the astrology of Jaimini, the karakas are assigned to planets according to the position of the planet in the Zodiac in the astrological chart being drawn up.

== Moveable karakas ==
The moveable karakas, or Chara karakas (from Sanskrit Chara, 'movable'), are the karakas published by Jaimini in the Upadesa Sutras.

The assignment of karakas to planets is determined by the celestial longitude of the planet relative to the beginning of the sign of the zodiac in which the planet is placed in the chart. That is, the planet will move from 0° relative longitude where it enters the sign to 30° where it crosses into the next sign of the zodiac. The Atmakaraka is the planet with the greatest relative celestial longitude. The other karakas are assigned to planets in descending order of relative celestial longitude according to the following table.

Name	Karaka	Lordship over	Notes
Atma	Atmakaraka	Oneself, the soul	Strongest influence in the horoscope
Amatya	Amatyakaraka	Mind, close associate	
Bhratru	Bhratrukaraka	Brothers	
Matru	Matrukaraka	Mother	
Pitru	Pitrukaraka	Father	Omitted by some sources
Putra	Putrakaraka	Children	
Gnathi	Gnathikaraka	Relations	
Dara	Darakaraka	Husband/Wife	

In the rare cases when two planets have the same relative celestial longitude to the nearest second of arc then they are both assigned to the same karaka. To avoid the last karaka (Dara) being left without a planet. Rahu is included with the usual seven planets. However, because Rahu has retrograde motion, the relative celestial longitude of Rahu is measured from the end of the sign it is in, not the beginning. In the even rarer case when more than two planets share the same relative longitude, there will be more than one karaka without a planet. After assigning Rahu to the leftover karaka highest up the hierarchy, the remainder of leftover karakas are assigned the planet that has the same lordship as in the fixed karakas.

=== Pitrukaraka ===
There is some disagreement over whether Pitrukaraka should be included in the hierarchy of karakas when assigning planets. Pitrukaraka exists in the ancient texts but it is not clear that it should be given the same treatment as the others. Without Pitrukaraka, seven planets are required for assignment. With Pitrukaraka, eight planets are required for assignment so Rahu in included with the usual seven. Parashara in Brihat Parashara Hora Shastra supports the seven-karaka system.

=== Jaimini's text ===
This system of karakas is based on the Upadesa Sutras in Chapter 1, First Foot/Subchapter (which is known as Adhikaar Sutras or Rules to be Followed).

==== Verse No. 10 in Sanskrit ====
“आत्माधिकः कलादिभिर्नभोगः सप्तानामष्टानां वा [जैमिनी सूत्रम् – प्रथम अध्याय प्रथम पाद श्लोक 10].

==== Sanskrit Transliteration ====
“Ātmādhikaḥ kalādibhirnabhōgaḥ saptānāmaṣṭānāṁ vā [jaiminī sūtram – prathama adhyāya prathama pāda ślōka 10].

==== English Translation & Meaning ====
[Ātmā - Atmakaraka/Significator of the Soul], [ādhikaḥ - More/Highest], [kalādibhir - Starting from the Minutes and Seconds of an Arc], [nabhōgaḥ - Planet/Celestial body], [saptānām - 7], [aṣṭānāṁ - 8], [vā - or].

== Fixed karakas ==
The fixed karakas, natural karakas, or Sthira karakas, are karakas which have a fixed association with the planets as described by Parashara.

Planet	Karaka	Lordship over	Notes
Ravi (Sun)	Atmakaraka	The soul, father	Strongest influence in the horoscope
Chandra (Moon)	Matrukaraka	Mother	
Kuja (Mars)	Bhratrukaraka	Brothers	
Kuja (Mars)	Gnathikaraka	Cousins	
Budha (Mercury)	Amatyakaraka	Profession	The planet for Amatyakaraka is not given in Parashara, this association is assumed by later astrologers.
Guru (Jupiter)	Putrakaraka	Children	
Sukra (Venus)	Darakaraka	Husband/wife	
Sani (Saturn)		Longevity	
Rahu		Maternal relations	
Ketu		Paternal relations	

== Bibliography ==
- Mathur, Dinesh Shankar, Predictive Astrology: An Insight, Motilal Banarsidass Publications, 1999 ISBN 812081388X.
- Raman, Bangalore V., Studies in Jaimini Astrology, Motilal Banarsidass Publishers, 2003 ISBN 8120813979.
- Sastri, Pothukuchi Subrahmanya, Maharishi Jaimini's Jaimini Sutram (complete), Ranjan Publications, 2006 ISBN 9788188230181.
