= HMS Powerful (1895) =

British lead ship of Powerful-class

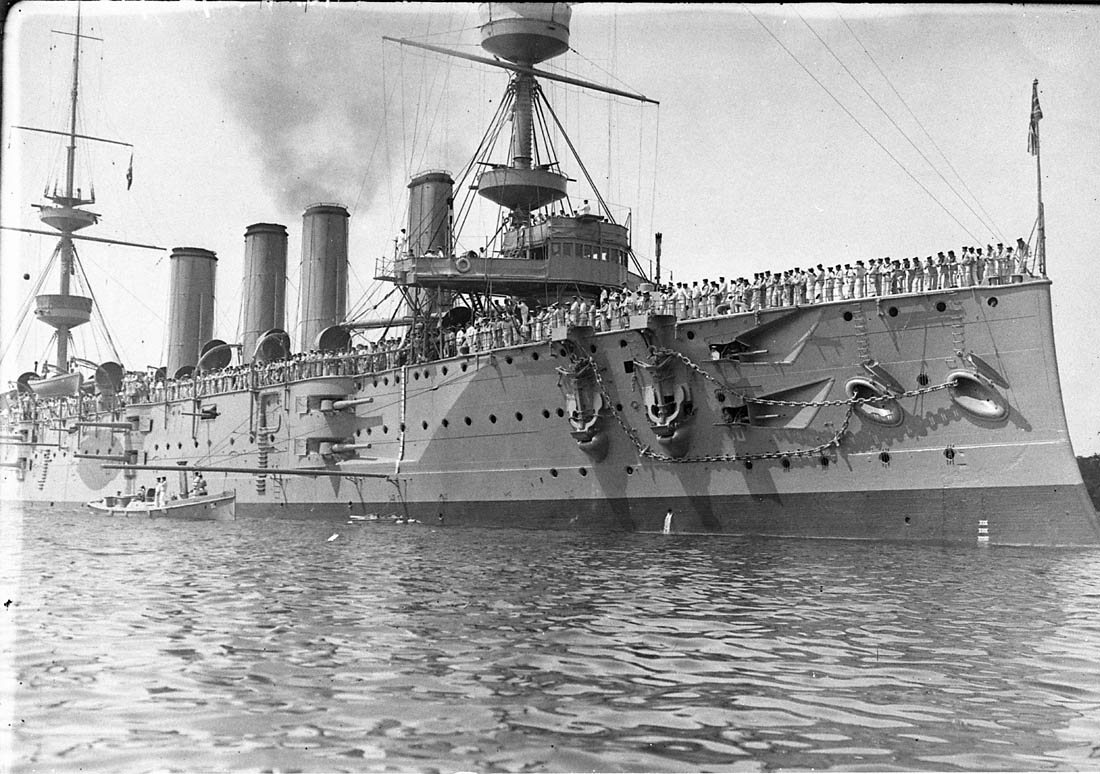
- Sailors line the deck of Powerful in Sydney Harbour, Australia (1905–1912)

History

United Kingdom
- Name: Powerful
- Builder: Vickers Limited, Barrow-in-Furness
- Laid down: 10 March 1894
- Launched: 24 July 1895
- Commissioned: 8 June 1897
- Renamed: Impregnable, November 1919
- Reclassified: Training ship, August 1912
- Stricken: 27 March 1929
- Fate: Sold for scrap, August 1929

General characteristics (as built)
- Class & type: Powerful-class protected cruiser
- Displacement: 14,200 long tons (14,400 t) (normal)
- Length: 538 ft (164.0 m) (o/a)
- Beam: 71 ft (21.6 m)
- Draught: 27 ft (8.2 m)
- Installed power: 25,000 ihp (19,000 kW); 48 × Belleville boilers
- Propulsion: 2 × shafts; 2 × triple-expansion steam engines
- Speed: 22 knots (41 km/h; 25 mph)
- Range: 7,000 nmi (13,000 km; 8,100 mi) at 14 knots (26 km/h; 16 mph)
- Complement: 894 (designed); 799 (1916)
- Armament: 2 × single 9.2 in (234 mm) guns; 12 × single 6 in (152 mm) guns; 16 × single 12-pdr (3 in (76 mm) guns; 12 × single 3-pdr (47 mm (1.9 in)) guns; 4 × 18 in (450 mm) torpedo tubes
- Armour: Deck: 2.5–4 in (64–102 mm); Barbettes: 6 in (152 mm); Turrets: 6 in (152 mm); Conning tower: 12 in (305 mm); Casemates: 2–6 in (51–152 mm)

HMS Powerful was the lead ship of her class of two protected cruisers built for the Royal Navy (RN) in the 1890s. She was initially assigned to the China Station and then provided landing parties which fought in the Siege of Ladysmith of 1899–1900 during the Second Boer War. After a lengthy refit, the ship was placed in reserve until 1905 when Powerful became the flagship of the Australia Station. Upon her return home in 1912, she was again reduced to reserve for a brief time before she was reclassified as a training ship. The ship remained in this role until 1929 when she was sold for scrap.

== Design and description ==
The Powerful-class cruiser was designed to counter the Russian armoured cruiser Rurik which had been designed as a long-range commerce raider. This required long range and high speed to catch the Russian ship. The ships displaced 14,200 long tons (14,400 t) at normal load. They had an overall length of 538 feet (164.0 m), a beam of 71 feet (21.6 m) and a draught of 27 feet (8.2 m). The ships were powered by a pair of four-cylinder triple-expansion steam engines, each driving one propeller shaft, using steam provided by 48 Belleville boilers. The engines were designed to produce a total of 25,000 indicated horsepower (19,000 kW) at forced draught and gave a maximum speed of 22 knots (41 km/h; 25 mph). Powerful reached a maximum speed of 21.8 knots (40.4 km/h; 25.1 mph) from 25,886 ihp (19,303 kW) during her sea trials. She carried enough coal to give her a range of 7,000 nautical miles (13,000 km; 8,100 mi) at 14 knots (26 km/h; 16 mph) and her complement consisted of 894 officers and ratings.

The main armament of the Powerful-class cruisers consisted of two 9.2-inch (234 mm) Mk VIII guns in single gun turrets, one each fore and aft of the superstructure. Her secondary armament of a dozen 6-inch (152 mm) Mk I or II guns was arranged in casemates amidships. The end casemates were the first two-storey (guns on the main and upper decks) casemates in the RN. For defence against torpedo boats, sixteen 12-pounder 3-inch (76 mm) 12-cwt (Note: "Cwt" is the abbreviation for hundredweight, 12 cwt referring to the weight of the gun.) guns and a dozen 3-pounder (47 mm (1.9 in)) Hotchkiss guns were fitted. Two additional 12-pounder 8-cwt guns could be dismounted for service ashore. The ships also mounted four submerged 18-inch (450 mm) torpedo tubes, a pair on each broadside.

With the exception of the barbettes, which used mild steel, all of the protective plating of the cruisers was Harvey armour. The curved protective deck ranged in thickness from 2.5–4 inches (64–102 mm) and the conning tower was protected by 12 inches (305 mm). The armour of the gun turrets, their barbettes and the casemates was 6 inches thick. The casemates had 2-inch (51 mm) backs.

== Construction and career ==
Powerful was laid down by Vickers Limited in their Barrow-in-Furness shipyard on 10 March 1894 and launched on 24 July 1895 by the Louisa Cavendish, Duchess of Devonshire. The ship was commissioned on 8 June 1897 with Captain the Hon. Hedworth Lambton in command, for service on the China Station. Her departure was delayed so that she could participate in the fleet review commemorating Queen Victoria's Diamond Jubilee on 26 June and the annual fleet manoeuvres in July. During a full-power run between Wei Hai Wai, China, and Yokohama, Japan, in late July 1898, her stokers mutinied, but she then visited Port Arthur without incident.

Ordered home in 1899, Powerful was diverted from the shorter route through the Suez Canal to round the southern tip of Africa in light of rising tensions between the British and the Boers in South Africa. The ship departed Hong Kong, China, on 17 September and arrived at Simonstown on 13 October, two days after the Second Boer War began; Lambton having picked up a half-battalion of the King's Own Yorkshire Light Infantry from the island of Mauritius on his own initiative. Her sister ship, Terrible, commanded by Captain Percy Scott, arrived the following day and Scott improvised field carriages for a pair of 4.7-inch (120 mm) and a pair of Terrible's 12-pounder guns. After a request from Lieutenant General George White, commander of the besieged forces at Ladysmith for more long-range artillery, Powerful ferried all four guns to Durban, reaching it on 29 November. Lambton acquired another pair of 12-pounders and led a naval brigade that reached Ladysmith on the last two trains to make it through. After the Relief of Ladysmith at the end of February, the brigade departed the town on 7 March and arrived at Simontown on the 12th. Powerful left Simonstown three days later and arrived at Portsmouth on 11 April.

The enthusiastic response in Britain to the "heroes of Ladysmith" was enormous and made Lambton a well-known public figure. Queen Victoria sent a telegram saying, "Pray express to the Naval Brigade my deep appreciation of the valuable services they have rendered with their guns." while a reception and celebratory march through London were among the first events ever recorded on film.

A newspaper described Powerful's return home:

As the great vessel steamed into Portsmouth Harbour at four o'clock this afternoon, she was greeted with thunders of applause .... vessels lying off here were dressed with flags, and their crews, swarming along the yards, swelled the roar of welcome......By three o'clock the jetty was thronged with men, women and children. ... A more eager, joyous gathering I never saw.....We cheered, we waved hats and handkerchiefs and we were half wild with delight.

— Daily News

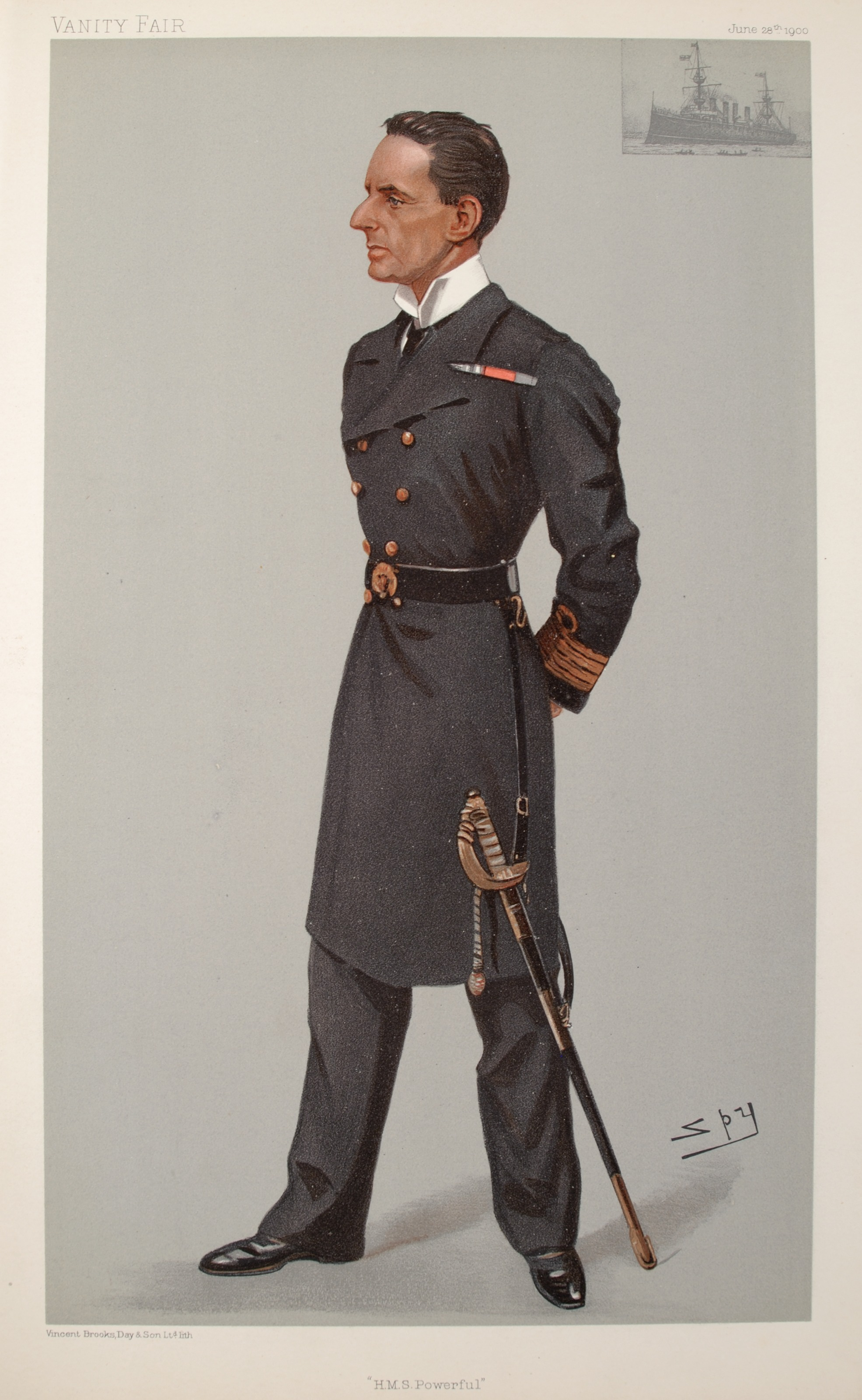
Captain Hedworth Lambton

The naval brigade paraded for Queen Victoria at Windsor Castle on 2 May. The RN field gun competition commemorates the participation of Terrible and Powerful in the relief of Ladysmith. In 1921 a new Primary School in Ladysmith was named after Lieutenant Frederick Greville Egerton, a gunnery officer from Powerful who was killed at Ladysmith.

=== Later career ===
Powerful paid off on 8 June 1900 at Portsmouth Dockyard and later began a long refit in 1902–1903 During this refit, the RN added four six-inch guns in casemates amidships, although no additional ammunition could be accommodated in the ship. The ship was briefly commissioned in August 1903 to participate in the annual fleet manoeuvres and was assigned to the reserve on 1 March 1905. In August Captain Lionel Halsey took command of Powerful, as flag captain to Sir Wilmot Fawkes as Commander-in-Chief Australia Station. At the time Powerful was commissioning as flagship on the Australia Station. Halsey remained in that post until 1908.

At the beginning of December 1905, Powerful was at Fremantle in Western Australia. On 10 October 1907 the ship took aboard a new crew in Colombo, Ceylon. On 3 February 1908 the first trans-Tasman radio transmission was made via Powerful which was in the Tasman Sea. A Sydney Morning Herald journalist, Charles Bean, joined the ship in August 1908 as a special correspondent to report the visit of sixteen American warships – the Great White Fleet. Bean wrote a book, With the Flagship in the South (London, 1909), based on his reports and had it published at his own expense. Powerful took aboard a new crew in Colombo on 12 January 1910. In 1911 Powerful visited Auckland, New Zealand to inspect the facilities and Captain Edward Bruen recommended the setting up of a naval stores facility.

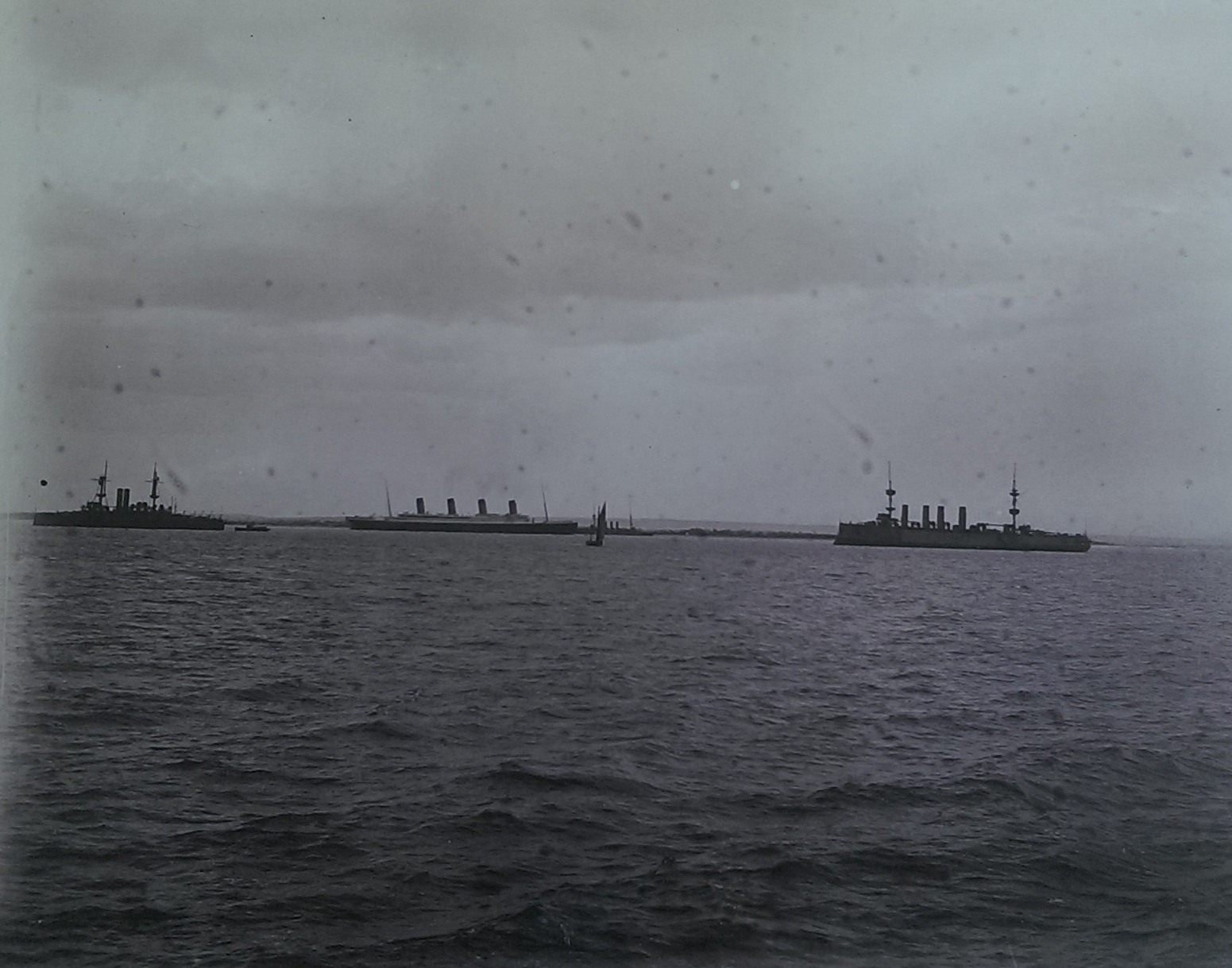
RMS Titanic passing Powerful (right) and a Royal Sovereign-class battleship in Southampton, 10 April 1912

The ship was ordered home in January 1912 and loaded the body of Alexander Duff, 1st Duke of Fife at Port Said, Egypt, on 9 March en route. On April 10th, the ship was photographed in Southampton along with the battleship HMS Revenge (1892) and the ocean liner Titanic. After arriving, she was briefly assigned to the 7th Cruiser Squadron of the Third (Reserve) Fleet before she was reclassified as a boys training ship at Devonport in August 1912. Powerful was assigned as a tender to HMS Impregnable in 1913. She was reassigned to a training role on 23 September and was renamed Impregnable I in November 1919. The ship was paid off on 27 March 1929 and was sold in August 1929 for breaking up.
