= Powerful-class cruiser =

Class of British protected cruisers

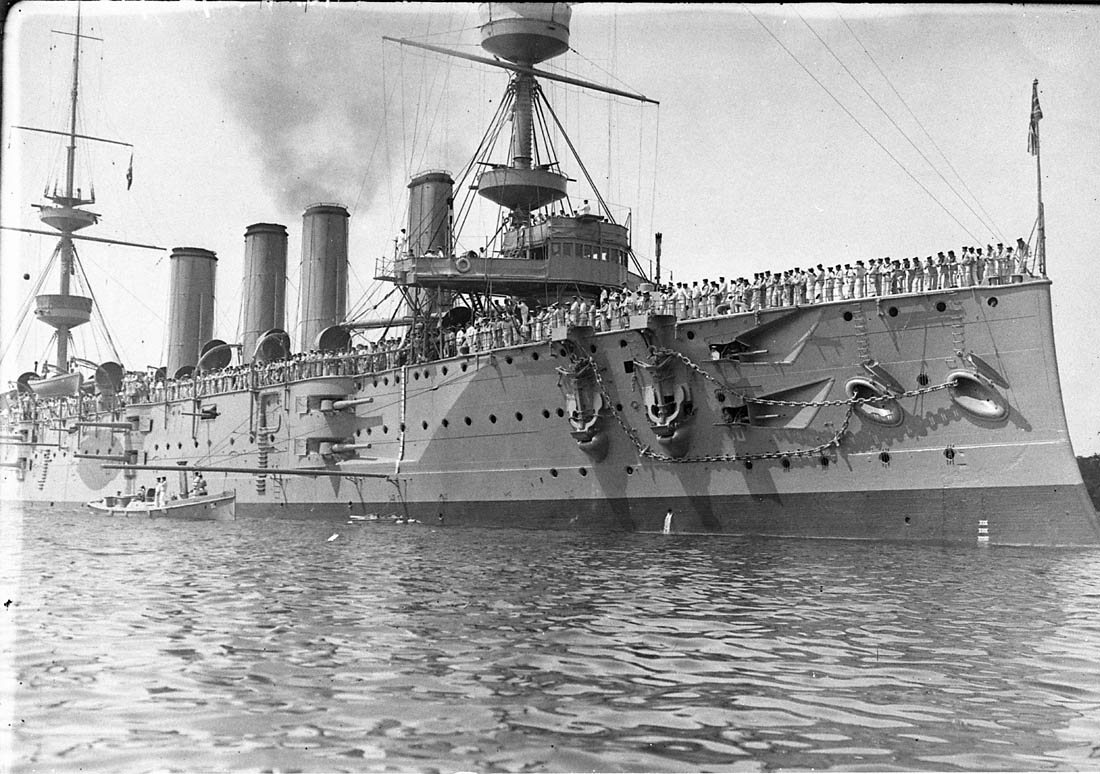
- Powerful in Sydney Harbour, Australia (1905–1912)

Class overview
- Name: Powerful class
- Operators: Royal Navy
- Preceded by: Edgar class
- Succeeded by: Diadem class
- Built: 1894–1898
- In service: 1897–1932
- In commission: 1897–1919
- Completed: 2
- Scrapped: 2

General characteristics (as built)
- Type: Protected cruiser
- Displacement: 14,200 long tons (14,400 t) (normal)
- Length: 538 ft (164.0 m) (o/a)
- Beam: 71 ft (21.6 m)
- Draught: 27 ft (8.2 m)
- Installed power: 25,000 ihp (19,000 kW); 48 × Belleville boilers
- Propulsion: 2 × shafts; 2 × triple-expansion steam engines
- Speed: 22 knots (41 km/h; 25 mph)
- Range: 7,000 nmi (13,000 km; 8,100 mi) at 14 knots (26 km/h; 16 mph)
- Complement: 894 (designed)
- Armament: 2 × single 9.2 in (234 mm) guns; 12 × single 6 in (152 mm) guns; 16 × single 12-pdr (3 in (76 mm) guns; 12 × single 3-pdr (47 mm (1.9 in)) guns; 4 × 18 in (450 mm) torpedo tubes
- Armour: Deck: 2.5–4 in (64–102 mm); Barbettes: 6 in (152 mm); Turrets: 6 in (152 mm); Conning tower: 12 in (305 mm); Casemates: 2–6 in (51–152 mm)

The Powerful class were a pair of first-class protected cruisers built for the Royal Navy (RN) in the 1890s, designed to hunt down enemy commerce raiders. Both ships served on the China Station and participated in the Second Boer War of 1899–1900. Terrible went on to help suppress the Boxer Rebellion a few months later. Powerful served as the flagship of the Australia Station in 1905–1912; shortly after her return home, she became a training ship and remained in that role until she was sold for scrap in 1929. Terrible was mostly in reserve after she returned home in 1902 and was often used as an accommodation ship. During the First World War she was disarmed and made one voyage as a troop transport in 1915. The ship became a depot ship when she returned home and then became a training ship in 1918. Terrible was sold for scrap in 1932.

== Background ==
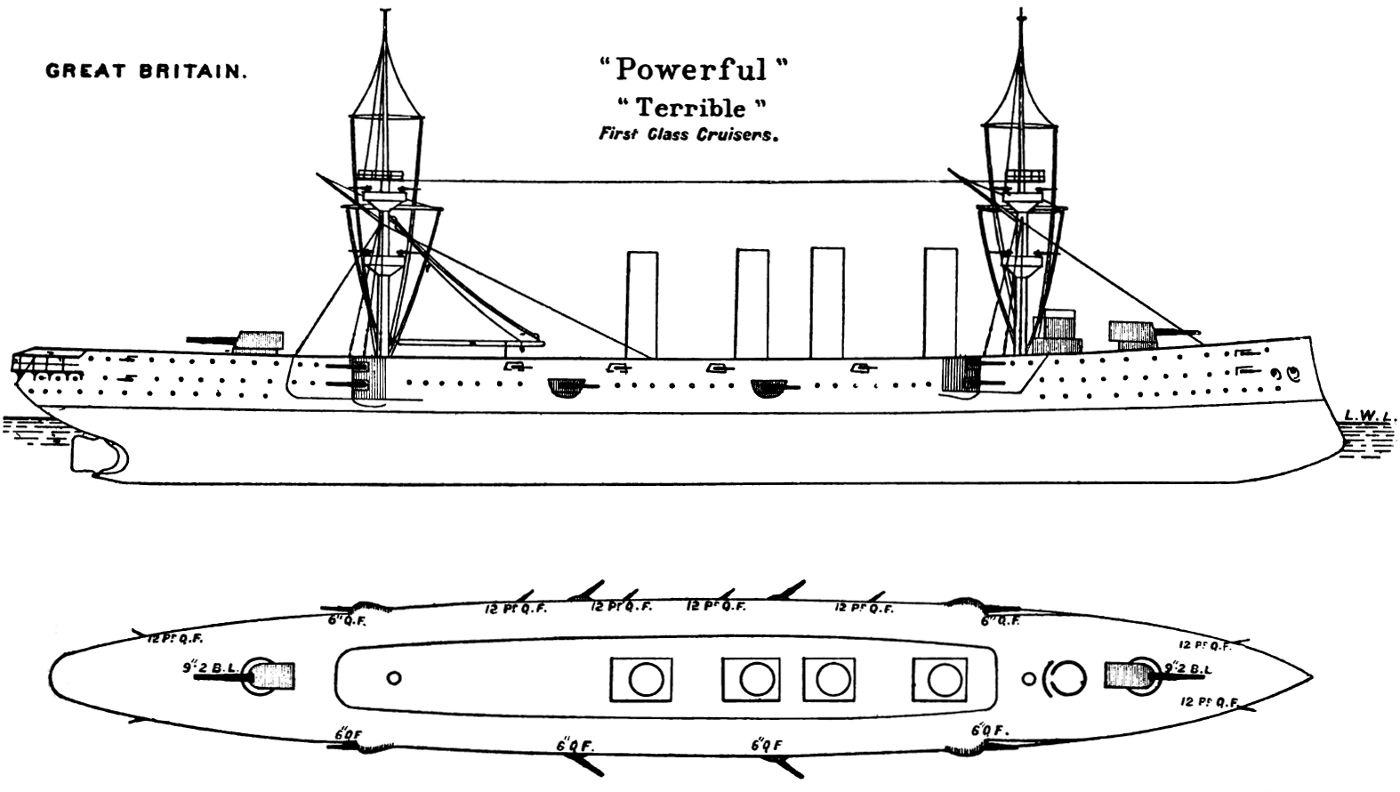
Right elevation, deck plan and armament layout from Brassey's Naval Annual 1897

The impetus for the construction of the Powerful class began with the laying down the Russian armoured cruiser Rurik in 1890 that was intended to be used as a commerce raider, although the Admiralty was fully occupied with the extensive naval construction mandated by the Naval Defence Act 1889 and could do nothing in response at that time. Some preliminary discussions occurred in November 1891, but it was not until the following year that William White, the Director of Naval Construction, was told to prepare sketch designs for a ship more heavily armed, at least as well armoured, faster and with greater endurance than Rurik and her successors. Russian attempts to seize fast ocean liners in 1885 and convert them into armed merchant cruisers also dictated that the new ships needed to be fast enough to catch them.

White's preliminary studies had led him to the conclusion a very large amount of coal would be needed to permit a high-speed pursuit of a commerce raider without losing time to re-coal, coupled with the large number of boilers needed to achieve the speed required, which meant that a very large ship was necessary, more than 100 feet (30 m) longer than the Majestic-class battleships then under construction. To ensure that the cruisers could maintain high speed in bad weather, White gave them a high freeboard which made them very seaworthy. White believed that the design required lightweight, efficient Belleville water-tube boilers if it was to achieve its requirements, but conservatives in Parliament and the Admiralty resisted the idea, given the RN's failures with water-tube boilers in the past, until extensive trials were conducted by the torpedo gunboat Sharpshooter and proved to be a complete success. The Admiralty approved the design on 23 October 1893 and they were ordered in the 1893–1894 Naval Estimates.

Observers criticised these ships for their light armament given their size in the magazine The Engineer. White rebutted their arguments by pointing out that it was impossible to add additional ammunition which made the addition of more guns pointless. He added that the armament of the Powerfuls "accounted for 27 per cent more of the displacement than the preceding Edgar class, and was protected by 660 long tons (670 t) of armour, as against 340 long tons (350 t) in the Edgars." The Admiralty did not find the ships satisfactory as they required a crew 64 per cent larger than the Edgars, cost 61 per cent more and had very nearly the same armament. Naval historian Antony Preston commented: "The Powerful and Terrible also mark the extreme folly of building cruisers to match specific opponents. In practice the intended opponents never meet, and it is always wiser to build affordable ships in large numbers. No navy could afford to build large numbers of the Powerful type, and even the British Empire at the height of its power found them too expensive."

== Description ==
The Powerful class displaced 14,200 long tons (14,400 t) at normal load. They had an overall length of 538 feet (164.0 m), a beam of 71 feet (21.6 m) and a draught of 27 feet (8.2 m). As they were intended for overseas service their steel hulls were sheathed in wood to prevent biofouling. The hull had a double bottom and was subdivided into 236 watertight compartments. At deep load, Terrible had a metacentric height of 2 feet (0.61 m) while Powerful's was 2.65 feet (0.81 m). Their designed complement consisted of 894 officers and ratings, the largest crew in the RN at that time.

The ships were propelled by a pair of vertical inverted four-cylinder triple-expansion steam engines, each driving one 19-foot-6-inch (5.9 m) propeller, using steam provided by 48 Belleville boilers with a working pressure of 210 psi (1,448 kPa; 15 kgf/cm^{2}). These were the first cruisers in the Royal Navy with four funnels. Their engines were designed to produce a total of 25,000 indicated horsepower (19,000 kW) using forced draught for a maximum speed of 22 knots (41 km/h; 25 mph). The ships reached a maximum speeds of 21.8–22.4 knots (40.4–41.5 km/h; 25.1–25.8 mph) from 25,572–25,886 ihp (19,069–19,303 kW) during their sea trials. They normally carried 1,500 long tons (1,524 t) of coal which gave them a range of 7,000 nmi (13,000 km; 8,100 mi) at 14 knots (26 km/h; 16 mph), but they had a maximum capacity of 3,100 long tons (3,150 t), the largest coal bunkers of any ship in the RN at that time.

=== Armament and protection ===
The main armament of the Powerful-class cruisers consisted of two 40-calibre BL 9.2-inch (234 mm) Mk VIII guns in single gun turrets, one each fore and aft of the superstructure. The mounts could elevate up to +15° and the guns fired a 380-pound (170 kg) projectile with a muzzle velocity of 2,329 ft/s (710 m/s) to a maximum range of 12,846 yards (11,746 m). Their secondary armament of a dozen 40-calibre quick-firing (QF) 6-inch (152 mm) Mk I or II guns was arranged in casemates amidships. The end casemates were the first two-storey (guns on the main and upper decks) casemates in the RN. The guns had a maximum range of 10,000 yards (9,100 m) at an elevation of 15° from their 100-pound (45 kg) shell at a muzzle velocity of 2,205 ft/s (672 m/s).

For defence against torpedo boats, sixteen 12-pounder (3-inch (76 mm)) 12-cwt (Note: "Cwt" is the abbreviation for hundredweight, 12 cwt referring to the weight of the gun.) guns were fitted. Eight of these guns were mounted in embrasures at the ships' bow and stern on the main and upper decks and the remaining eight guns were placed amidships on the upper deck. Their 12.5-pound (5.7 kg) shells had a range of 8,480 yards (7,750 m) at an elevation of 20° at a muzzle velocity of 2,205 ft/s (672 m/s). The ships were equipped with a dozen 3-pounder (47 mm (1.9 in)) Hotchkiss guns mounted in the pair of fighting tops on the military fore and mainmasts. Two additional 12-pounder 8-cwt guns could be dismounted for service ashore. The ships also mounted four submerged 18-inch (450 mm) torpedo tubes, a pair on each broadside.

The ships generally used Harvey armour. The gun turrets were 6 inches thick on their face and sides, with a 1-inch (25 mm) roof. Their barbettes and the casemates were protected by 6-inch armour plates and the latter had 2-inch (51 mm) rear plates. The conning tower was protected by 12-inch (305 mm) plates. They had a curved armoured deck that had its crown in the middle of the ship 3 feet 6 inches (1.07 m) above the waterline, and the edges were 6 feet 6 inches (1.98 m) below the waterline. The deck was 6 inches (152 mm) thick over the machinery, 4 inches (102 mm) thick over the magazines, and 2.5 inches (64 mm) thick in the middle of the ship. The bottom 1 foot (0.3 m) of the protective deck was only 2.5 inches thick.

=== Modifications ===
After completing their sea trials, the funnels were heightened by 10 feet (3.0 m) to improve the draught of the boilers. Mark I Wireless Telegraph (radio) sets were installed in each ship in 1900–1901. The ships were refitted in 1902–1903 and four more six-inch guns were added in casemates amidships at that time, although no additional ammunition could be accommodated. The three-pounders were removed from Powerful's upper fighting tops in 1904–1905 and both ships were fitted with fire-control equipment in the upper fore and lower main tops in 1905–1906. All of Terrible's three-pounders had been removed by 1910, but Powerful retained her remaining guns as late as February 1912. The torpedo tubes were removed from both ships in 1914.

== Ships ==
The following table gives the build details and purchase cost of the members of the Powerful class. Standard British practice at that time was for these costs to exclude armament and stores. (Note: The discrepancy between the figures in Brassey's Naval Annual between the 1902 and 1906 editions is unexplained.)

Ship	Builder	Laid down	Launched	Completed	Cost according to	
Ship	Builder	Laid down	Launched	Completed	(BNA 1902)	(BNA 1906)
Powerful	Vickers, Barrow-in-Furness	10 March 1894	24 July 1895	8 June 1897	£674,879	£705,335
Terrible	J & G Thompson, Clydebank	21 February 1894	27 May 1895	24 March 1898	£681,419	£708,619

== Careers ==
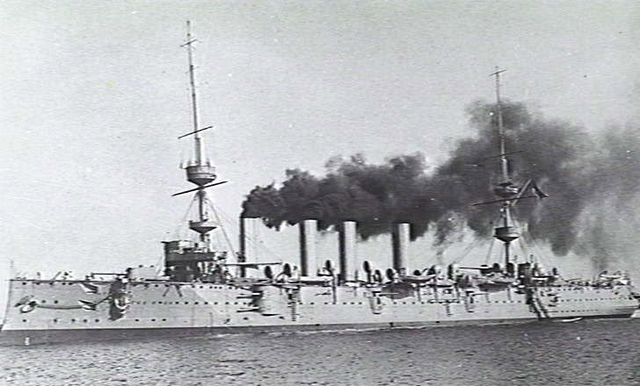
Powerful in 1908

Both ships participated in the fleet review commemorating Queen Victoria's Diamond Jubilee in 1897. They both served on the China Station, and Powerful went out later that year. Terrible had engine problems and was not commissioned until the following year. She set a record ferrying relief crews for the Mediterranean Fleet from Portsmouth to Malta in only 121 hours in late 1898. The ship was ordered to relieve Powerful in the Far East in late 1899, but they were both diverted to South Africa in light of rising tensions between the British and the Boers.

The ships arrived in mid-October, a few days after the Second Boer War began. Terrible's captain, Percy Scott, then improvised field carriages for some naval guns to satisfy a request for more long-range artillery. Powerful's captain, the Hon. Hedworth Lambton led a naval brigade and some of Percy's guns to reinforce the garrison of Ladysmith in late November. Terrible contributed a naval brigade and guns of her own during the Relief of Ladysmith in December 1899–March 1900. The performance of the gun crews from both ships inspired the RN's field gun competition. The ships continued on their respective voyages after Ladysmith was succored in March, Powerful to much acclaim in England and Terrible to China where her crew and guns helped to suppress the Boxer Rebellion a few months later. They were part of the relief force that reached the foreign quarter of Tianjin in June as well as the expedition that defeated the Chinese forces in the city of Tianjin in mid-July. They then participated in the second relief expedition to Peking in August before returning to the ship in September. Afterwards Scott devoted himself and his crew to gunnery training and later had his methods adopted by the entire Royal Navy.

Upon returning home both ships paid off and received long refits in 1902–1903. They spent the next several years in reserve. Powerful became the flagship of the Australia Station in 1905 until her return home in 1912 and then became a training ship until 1929 when she was sold for scrap. Terrible was principally in reserve after her return from China in 1902 and then served as an accommodation ship. During the First World War, she had most of her armament removed and briefly served as a troop transport before becoming a depot ship. Terrible then served as a training ship from 1918 until 1932 when, in her turn, she was sold for scrap.
