= Meux =

Meux may refer to:

== People ==
- Edward Meux Worsley (1747–1782), British politician
- Hedworth Meux GCB, KCVO (1856–1929), British Royal Navy officer
- John Meux (died 1657), English politician
- Meux baronets, people who held titles in two separate baronetcies
- Richard Meux Benson (1824–1915), English priest
- Valerie, Lady Meux (1847–1910), American-born English socialite of the Victorian era
- William Meux

== Places ==
- Meux, Charente-Maritime, Nouvelle-Aquitaine, France (pronounced as: IPA: [mø]); a commune in southwestern France
- Le Meux, Compiègne, Oise, Hauts-de-France, France (pronounced as: IPA: [lə mø]); a commune in northern France
- Meux, Wallonia (Walloon: Meu), La Bruyère, Belgium; a town and former municipality

== Other ==
- Meux London ales, produced by the Horse Shoe Brewery

== See also ==
- Mø (disambiguation) (native French pronunciation of Meux, as IPA)
- MEU (disambiguation)
- Mel (disambiguation)
- Mex (disambiguation)
- MUX (disambiguation)
