= Marko =

Marko may refer to:

- Marko (given name)
- Marko (surname)
- Márkó, a village in Hungary
- Marko 1927 F.C., a Greek football club

== See also ==
- Marco (disambiguation)
- Markko (disambiguation)
- Marka (disambiguation)
- Markov
- Marku
- Mark Zero (disambiguation), including Mark0
- Narko, Queensland
- Narco (disambiguation)
