= Mark Zero =

Mark Zero or Mark 0 may refer to:

- Aptera Mk-0 (Mark Zero), an all-electric 3-wheeled autocycle car replacement
- Piëch Mark Zero, an all-electric GT car from Piëch
- "Mark Zero!" (Japanese: 零式!, romanized: Reishiki!), chapter 11 of the serialized manga comic The Café Terrace and Its Goddesses (Japanese: 女神のカフェテラス, romanized: Megami no Kafe Terasu)

== See also ==
- Prusa i3 Mark 0, a 3D-printer
- Top Hat 25 Mk 0 (Mark 0), a yacht design
- T-55E Mark 0, an Egyptian armoured combat vehicle variant of a Soviet tank
- English Electric DEUCE Mark 0 (Digital Electronic Universal Computing Engine), a British computer
- All pages with titles containing "Mark" and "Zero"
- All pages with titles containing "Mark" and "0"
- MK0 (disambiguation)
- Marko (disambiguation)
- Mark (disambiguation)
- Zero (disambiguation)
- 0 (disambiguation)
- MO (disambiguation)
- M0 (disambiguation)
