= Mø (disambiguation) =

MØ is a Danish singer songwriter (real name Karen Marie Ørsted).

Mø or ungmø (Danish for "maid") is not to be confused with:

- MΦ (M-phi), an abbreviation for macrophages, cells produced by the differentiation of monocytes in tissues
- M0 (disambiguation) (M-zero)
- Mo (disambiguation) (M-O)
- Meux (disambiguation), native French pronunciation - IPA: [mø]

== See also ==
- Meux, Charente-Maritime, Nouvelle-Aquitaine, France (pronounced as: IPA: [mø]); a commune
- Le Meux, Compiègne, Oise, Hauts-de-France, France (pronounced as: IPA: [lə mø]); a commune
- The dictionary definition of ungmö at Wiktionary
