= M1900 =

M1900 may refer to:

- FN M1900 or Browning M1900, pistol
- Colt M1900, pistol
- 76 mm gun M1900
- Mannlicher M1900, a rifle, see Ferdinand Mannlicher
- M1900 variant of the Hotchkiss M1914 machine gun
- 5-inch gun M1900, a US Army artillery piece
- 6-inch gun M1900, a US Army artillery piece

== See also ==
- M0 (disambiguation)
