= 0M =

0M (zero M) or 0-M may refer to:

- Zero meridian, or Prime Meridian
- Zero metres
  - 1E0m^{2}, an abbreviation for square metre, an order of magnitude for expressing area
  - 1E0m^{3}, an abbreviation for cubic metre, an order of magnitude for expressing volume
- Zero manifold
- Several terms related to 0 (number):
  - Zero map; see constant function
  - Zero morphism, a kind of morphism in category theory
  - Zero matrix, a matrix with all entries being zero
- Agent Zero-M, a range of secret agent toy weapons by Mattel Toys

== See also ==
- M0 (disambiguation)
- Om (disambiguation)
