= MKO =

MKO may refer to:

== Places ==
- Davis Field (Oklahoma) (IATA airport code MKO), Muskogee, Oklahoma, USA
- Markona railway station (station code MKO), Markona, Odisha, India
- Muskego station (station code MKO), Muskego, Milwaukee, Wisconsin, USA; see List of Amtrak stations

== People ==
- More Knowledgeable Other, a person who has a higher understanding; see Instructional scaffolding
- Mko (Potawatomi: Bear), a doodem clan of the Potawatomi tribe of Great Plains amerinds

=== Persons ===
- Mary-Kate Olsen (born 1986), American designer and businessperson, sister of Elizabeth, one of the Olsen Twins with Ashley
- Mkrtich Arzumanyan (Armenian: Մկրտիչ Արզումանյան; born 1976), better known as 'Mko' (Armenian: Մկո), Armenian artist-entertainer
- Moshood Kashimawo Olawale Abiola (1937–1998, known as MKO), Nigerian businessperson

== Groups, organizations ==
- Magyar Közösségi Összefogás (MKÖ; Hungarian: Hungarian Community Togetherness), a Slovak political party, predecessor to the Hungarian Alliance (Slovak political party)
- Makung Airlines (ICAO airline code MKO), see List of defunct airlines of Taiwan
- Manitoba Keewatinook Ininew Okimowin (MKO), Manitoba, Canada; see Tribal council (Canada)
- Markoss Aviation (ICAO airline code MKO), see List of defunct airlines of the United Kingdom
- Mauna Kea Observatories, Big Island, Hawaii, USA; a group of astronomical observatories on Mauna Kea
- Mujahedin-e Khalq Organization (People's Mojahedin Organization of Iran, Persian: سازمان مجاهدین خلق ایران, romanized: Sâzmân-e Mojâhedin-e Khalgh-e Irân), a dissident organization
- Münchener Kammerorchester (MKO; German: Munich Chamber Orchestra), Munich, Germany
- East Coast Naval Command (MKO, Swedish: Ostkustens marinkommando), Sweden; former name of East Coast Naval Base, Royal Swedish Navy

== Other uses ==
- Mingang Doso language (ISO 639-3 language code mko), a language of Nigeria,
- Mechanical Keep Out, the clearance required around a PCBA to avoid mechanical fitment issues
- Melkovite (symbol Mko); see List of mineral symbols
- mKO, a red fluorescent protein

== See also ==
- MK0 (disambiguation)
