= Marku =

Marku is an Albanian surname. Notable people with the surname include:

- Albion Marku (born 2000), Albanian footballer
- Antonio Marku (born 1992), Albanian footballer
- Florian Marku (born 1996), Albanian boxer
- Henry Marku (born 2000), English footballer
- Herald Marku (born 1996), Albanian footballer
- Jimmy Marku (born 1974), Albanian-born British strongman competitor
- Kristi Marku (born 1995), Albanian footballer
- Mark Marku (disambiguation), multiple people
- Rovena Marku (born 1987), Albanian swimmer
- Taulant Marku (born 1994), Albanian footballer

== See also ==
- Marcus (name)
