= M0 =

M0 (M followed by zero) or M-0 may refer to:

== Places ==
- Megyeri Bridge (formerly known as Northern M0 Danube bridge), a bridge crossing the Danube River
- M0 motorway (Hungary), a ringroad around Budapest

== Other uses ==
- Aero Mongolia (IATA airline code: M0), an airline based in Ulaanbaatar, Mongolia
- M0 (economics), the monetary base regarding the money supply
- M0, a non-small-cell lung carcinoma staging code for no distant metastasis
- M0, a type of macrophage, a type of defensive phagocytic cell in living things
- Hayes command set M0, a command for turning a modem speaker off
- Measure zero, or M0, the size of the null set
- M0 macrophage, a phenotype of macrophage

== See also ==
- 0M (disambiguation)
- Mo (disambiguation)
- Mø (disambiguation)
- MØ (born 1988), Danish singer and songwriter
- MΦ, an abbreviation for macrophages
- μ_{0}, the vacuum permeability
- M_{☉}, the solar mass
- M (disambiguation)
- MK0 (disambiguation)
- Mark Zero (disambiguation)
