= Hedworth Meux =

Royal Navy Admiral of the Fleet (1856–1929)

Admiral of the Fleet The Honourable Sir Hedworth Meux GCB KCVO
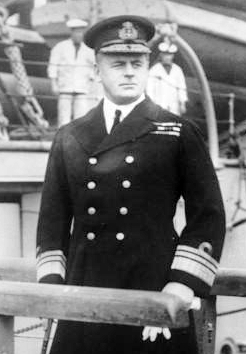
- Meux as a vice admiral
- Born: Hedworth Lambton; 5 July 1856; London
- Died: 20 September 1929 (aged 73); Danebury, Hampshire
- Burial place: Bury Green Cemetery, Cheshunt
- Spouse: Mildred Sturt (m. 1910)
- Relatives: George Lambton, 2nd Earl of Durham (father)
- Military career
- Allegiance: United Kingdom
- Branch: Royal Navy
- Service years: 1870–1916
- Rank: Admiral of the Fleet
- Commands: HMS Dolphin; HMY Osborne; HMS Warspite; HMS Powerful; HMY Victoria and Albert; Third Cruiser Squadron; China Station; Portsmouth Command
- Conflicts: Anglo-Egyptian War; Second Boer War; First World War
- Awards: Knight Grand Cross of the Order of the Bath; Knight Commander of the Royal Victorian Order

Admiral of the Fleet Sir Hedworth Meux (pronounced Mews), né Lambton, GCB, KCVO (5 July 1856 – 20 September 1929) was a Royal Navy officer. As a junior officer he was present at the bombardment of Alexandria during the Anglo-Egyptian War.

In 1899, during the Second Boer War, Lambton stopped at Mauritius, and on his own initiative picked up a battalion of soldiers stationed there. Knowing that the British forces at Ladysmith urgently needed more powerful guns, Lambton led a naval brigade to the rescue with four twelve-pounders and two other guns. The enthusiastic response in Britain to the "heroes of Ladysmith" was enormous and made Captain Hedworth Lambton a well-known public figure. He went on to be Commander of the Third Cruiser Squadron in the Mediterranean Fleet and then Commander-in-Chief of the China Station.

During the First World War Meux, as he was then known, served as Commander-in-Chief, Portsmouth in which role his main responsibility was defending cross-Channel communications, including transport for the British Expeditionary Force crossing to France. He also initiated and organised a life-saving patrol service of small boats.

== Early career ==
Born the son of George Lambton, 2nd Earl of Durham and Lady Beatrix Frances Hamilton (daughter of James Hamilton, 1st Duke of Abercorn), Hedworth Lambton was educated at Cheam School and then joined the Royal Navy as a cadet in the training ship HMS Britannia on 15 January 1870. He joined the frigate HMS Endymion in the Channel Squadron in December 1871 and, having been promoted to midshipman, he transferred to the armoured frigate HMS Agincourt, flagship of the Channel Squadron. He joined the frigate HMS Undaunted at Sheerness in March 1875 and, having been promoted to sub-lieutenant on 20 September 1875, he transferred to the battleship HMS Alexandra, flagship of the Mediterranean Fleet in late 1876. Promoted to lieutenant on 27 February 1879, he became flag lieutenant to the Commander-in-Chief, Mediterranean Fleet in February 1880 and was present at the bombardment of Alexandria in July 1882 during the Anglo-Egyptian War. He was awarded the Turkish Order of the Medjidie, Third Class, on 3 February 1883.

At the Bombardment of Alexandria he served as the flag lieutenant on HMS Invincible under Admiral Seymour and there made the famous signal "Well Done Condor" to the gunship Condor.

Promoted to commander on 10 March 1883, Lambton attended the Royal Naval College, Greenwich and then became aide-de-camp to John Spencer, 5th Earl Spencer, who was at that time Lord Lieutenant of Ireland. Lambton became commanding officer of the sloop HMS Dolphin in the Mediterranean Fleet in July 1886 and commanding officer of the royal yacht HMY Osborne in February 1888. Promoted to captain on 30 June 1889, he became flag captain to the Commander-in-Chief, Pacific Station in the cruiser HMS Warspite in 1890. He was also awarded the Turkish Order of the Medjidie, Second Class, on 17 February 1890.

Lambton became Private Naval Secretary to Earl Spencer, who had become First Lord of the Admiralty, in 1894 and continued in that role under Viscount Goschen when he became First Lord of the Admiralty in June 1895. Both Spencer and Goschen, who were politicians and not naval officers, gave Lambton's opinion considerable weight in making senior naval appointments, but his judgement did not always correspond with that of the naval lords and during this time he generally antagonised the naval lords through a "lack of consideration". He became commanding officer of the cruiser HMS Powerful on the China Station in 1897.

== Ladysmith ==
On the return voyage in 1899 Lambton was ordered to Durban, South Africa at an important point in the Second Boer War. He stopped at Mauritius, and on his own initiative picked up a battalion of soldiers stationed there. Knowing that the British forces at Ladysmith urgently needed more powerful guns, Captain Percy Scott from the Powerful's sister ship, the cruiser HMS Terrible, devised carriages to transport naval cannon, and Lambton then led a naval brigade to the rescue with four 12-pounders and two other guns.

The enthusiastic response in Britain to the "heroes of Ladysmith" was enormous and made Captain Hedworth Lambton a well-known public figure. Queen Victoria sent a telegram saying, "Pray express to the Naval Brigade my deep appreciation of the valuable services they have rendered with their guns" while a reception and celebratory march through London were among the first events ever recorded on film.

The Daily News described the Powerful's return home: "As the great vessel steamed into Portsmouth Harbour at four o'clock this afternoon, she was greeted with thunders of applause ... vessels lying off here were dressed with flags, and their crews, swarming along the yards, swelled the roar of welcome. ... By three o'clock the jetty was thronged with men, women and children. ... A more eager, joyous gathering I never saw. ... We cheered, we waved hats and handkerchiefs and we were half wild with delight." Lambton was appointed a Companion of the Order of the Bath (CB) for his services in South Africa on 13 March 1900.

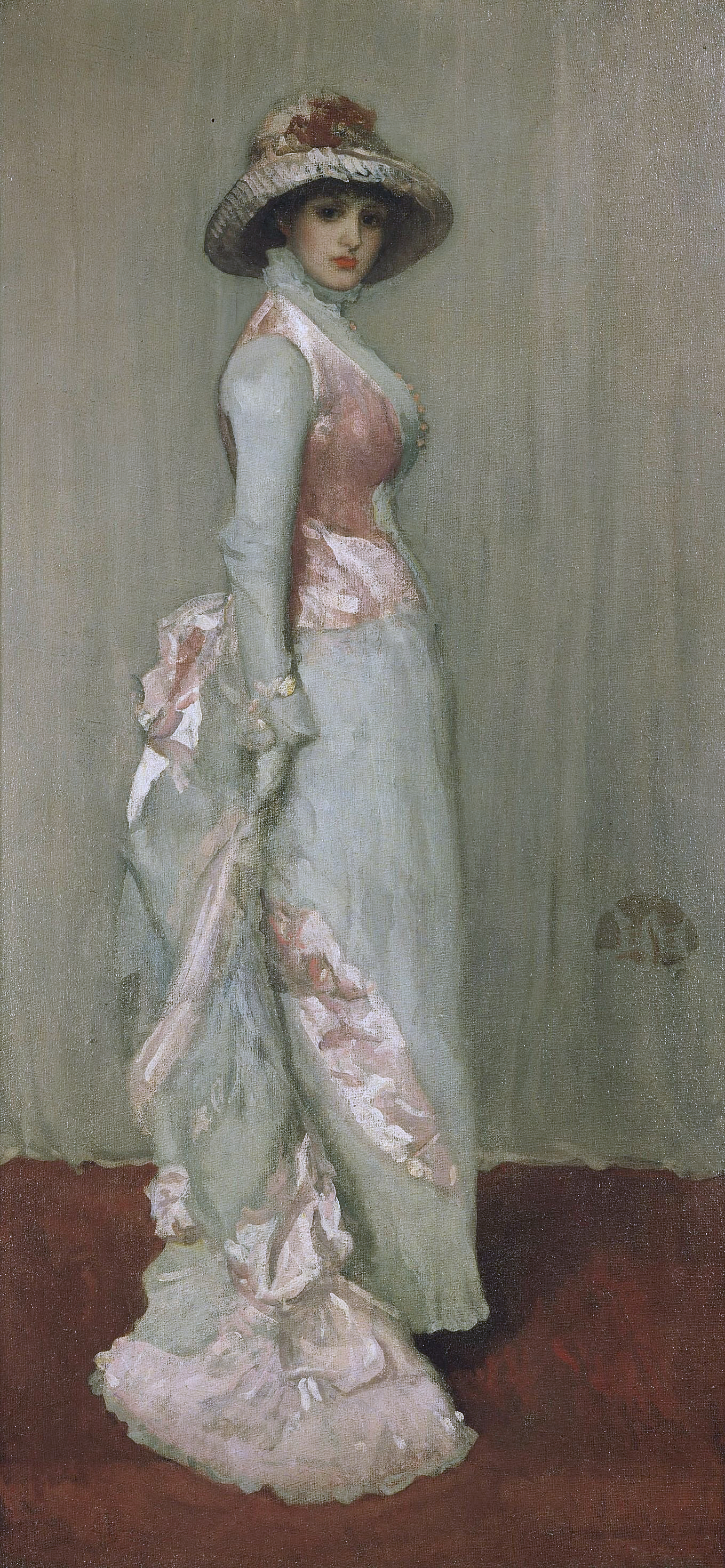
Valerie Lady Meux, about 20 years before she met Lambton

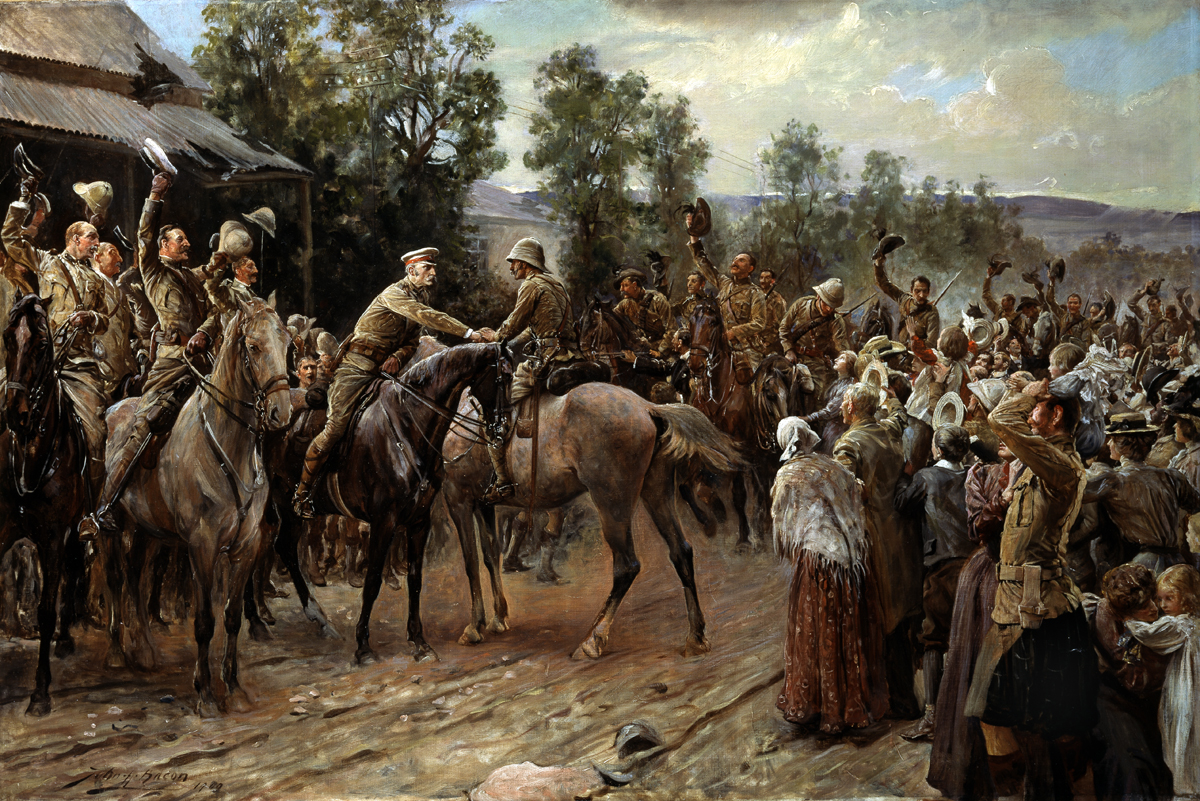
The Relief of Ladysmith, painting by John Henry Frederick Bacon (1868–1914)

It was against this background that Lambton met Valerie, Lady Meux, a beautiful socialite. After hearing the story of the naval guns at Ladysmith, she had ordered six 12-pounder cannon on travelling carriages to be made and sent out to South Africa. Lambton called on her to describe his experiences there, and praise the patriotic spirit of her gift. Lady Meux was "touched by this tribute" and wrote a will making Lambton the heir to the large fortune left by her husband Sir Henry Brent Meux upon his death in 1900, including her house at Theobalds Park in Hertfordshire. The only condition was that Lambton should change his name to Meux. He became a naval aide-de-camp to Queen Victoria on 9 January 1901, attended her funeral on 2 February 1901 and then became naval aide-de-camp to King Edward VII on 25 February 1901.

== Later career ==
Lambton transferred to the command of the Royal Yacht HMY Victoria and Albert in April 1901 and became Commodore, Royal Yachts on 23 July 1901, when he took command of the new Royal Yacht, also named HMY Victoria and Albert. For his service to the Royal Family he was appointed a Commander of the Royal Victorian Order (CVO) on 16 August 1901 and was also appointed an extra equerry to the King on 9 November 1902.

Promoted to rear admiral on 3 October 1902, Lambton became Second-in-Command of the Channel Fleet, with his flag in the battleship HMS Magnificent, in June 1903. He went on to be commander of the Third Cruiser Squadron in the Mediterranean Fleet, with his flag in the armoured cruiser HMS Leviathan, in November 1904. During this time he became an ally of Lord Charles Beresford in an ongoing dispute between Beresford and Sir John Fisher about navy policies. He was advanced to Knight Commander of the Royal Victorian Order on 16 April 1906. Promoted to vice admiral on 1 January 1907, he became Commander-in-Chief of the China Station, with his flag in the armoured cruiser HMS King Alfred in January 1908. He was advanced to Knight Commander of the Order of the Bath on 26 June 1908, attended the funeral of King Edward VII in May 1910 and became an extra equerry to King George V on 10 June 1910.

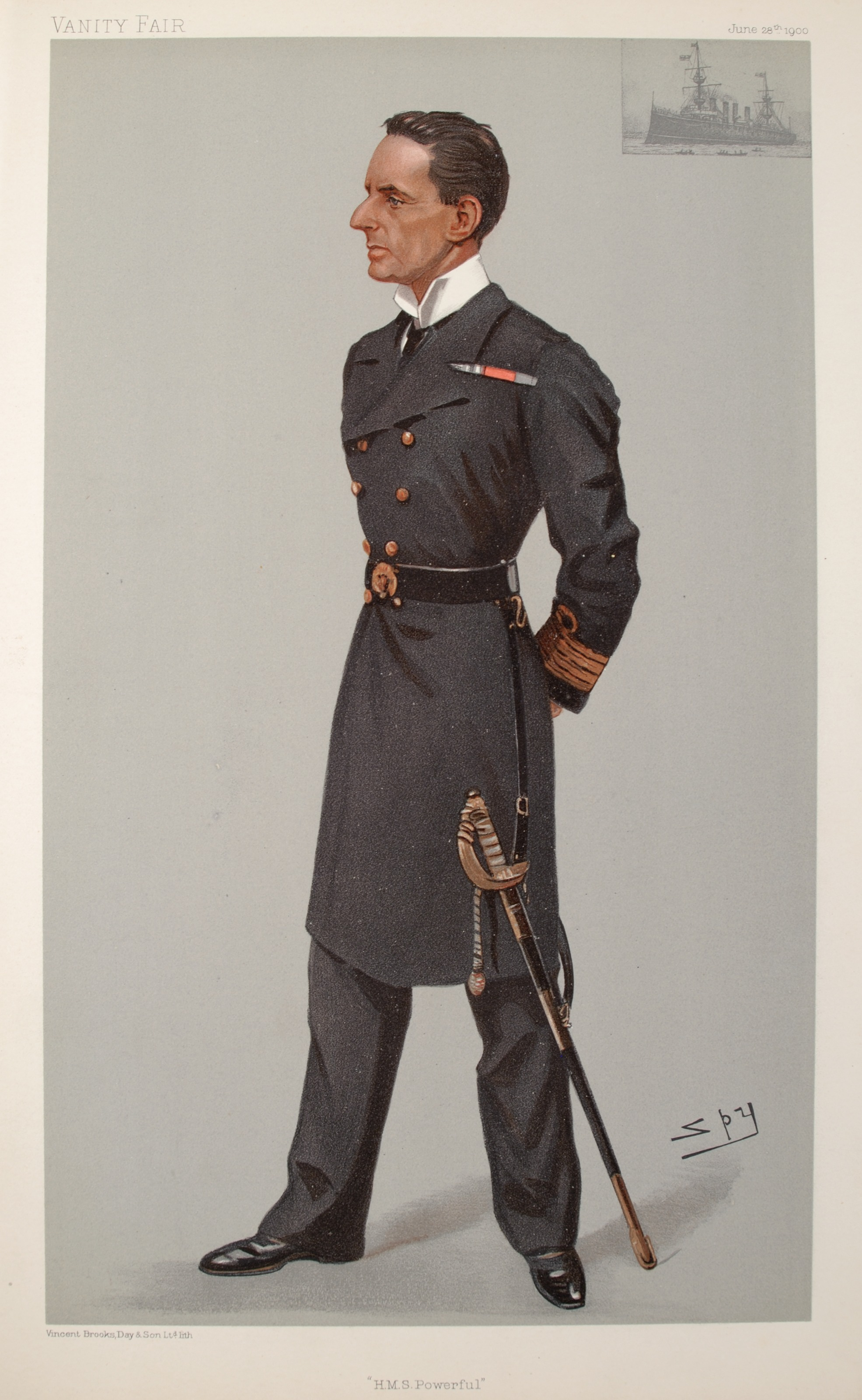
Captain Hedworth Lambton, Vanity Fair caricature – 1900

Following the death of Lady Meux in December 1910, Lambton changed his surname by royal licence to Meux, as stipulated in Lady Meux's will, thereby enabling him to inherit a substantial fortune. Promoted to full admiral on 1 March 1911, he was considered for the role of First Sea Lord but was considered too much of a playboy and became Commander-in-Chief, Portsmouth instead in July 1912. He was advanced to Knight Grand Cross of the Order of the Bath on 3 June 1913.

When the First World War broke out, Meux's main responsibility was defending cross-Channel communications, including transport for the British Expeditionary Force crossing to France. He also initiated and organised a life-saving patrol service of small boats. He was promoted Admiral of the Fleet on 5 March 1915 and stayed in the Royal Navy until February 1916, when he was persuaded to stand as the Conservative candidate in the Portsmouth by-election. He made some speeches in parliament on naval affairs but "he was not really interested in parliamentary work" and retired at the general election of December 1918. He retired from the Navy on 5 July 1921.

Meux was now free to pursue his long-standing interest in horses and racing. He bred bloodstock, first with a trainer in Yorkshire, then at the racing stables at Theobalds Park, part of the inheritance from Lady Meux. He died on 20 September 1929 at Danebury, an estate he had bought in Hampshire.

== Family ==
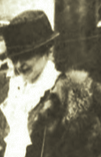
Lady Meux (1916)

In 1910, Lambton married Mildred Cecilia Harriet, daughter of Henry Sturt, 1st Baron Alington and widow of Henry Cadogan, Viscount Chelsea; they had no children, though he acquired five step-children, including Mary Spencer-Churchill, Duchess of Marlborough, who inherited the bulk of his estate.

== Sources ==
- Heathcote, Tony (2002). The British Admirals of the Fleet 1734–1995. Pen & Sword Ltd. ISBN 0-85052-835-6.

Military offices
Preceded by New post	Private Secretary to the First Lord of the Admiralty; 1894–1897	Succeeded by Wilmot Fawkes
Preceded by Sir Arthur Moore	Commander-in-Chief, China Station; 1908–1910	Succeeded by Sir Alfred Winsloe
Preceded by Sir Arthur Moore	Commander-in-Chief, Portsmouth; 1912–1916	Succeeded by Sir Stanley Colville
Parliament of the United Kingdom
Preceded by Bertram Falle and Lord Charles Beresford	Member of Parliament for Portsmouth; 1916 – 1918; With: Bertram Falle	Constituency abolished
