= MK0 =

MK0 may refer to:

- The geocode for the country of North Macedonia in the NUTS standard
- Aptera Mk-0, an all-electric 3-wheeled autocycle car replacement
- Piëch Mk0, an all-electric GT car from Piëch

== See also ==
- Prusa i3 MK0, a 3D-printer
- Top Hat 25 Mk 0, a yacht design
- Combat Vehicle 90 (CV90) Mk 0, a Swedish armoured combat vehicle
- Euroradar Captor-E ECRS Mk0, an airborne military aircraft radar
- Mark Zero (disambiguation)
- MKO (disambiguation)
- MK (disambiguation)
- 0 (disambiguation)
- Zero (disambiguation)
