= QF 6-inch naval gun =

QF 6-inch 40 calibre naval gun 15 cm/40 (6") 41st Year Type
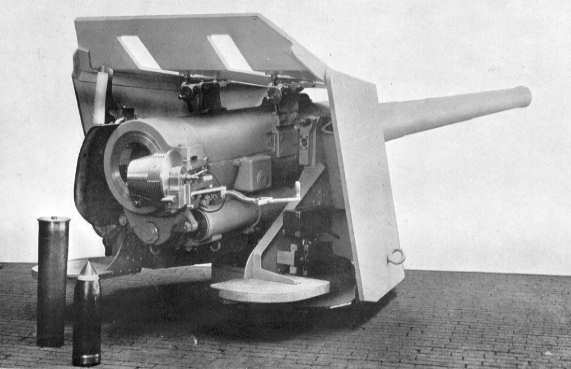
- Typical naval deck mounting. An early long cartridge case for gunpowder propellant is upended at bottom left, a shell stands next to the cartridge.
- Type: Naval gun Coast defence gun
- Place of origin: United Kingdom; License-produced in Japan

Service history
- In service: 1892–1945
- Used by: Royal Navy; Imperial Japanese Navy; Chilean Navy; Italian Navy; Argentine Navy; United States; Romanian Navy; Royal Canadian Navy
- Wars: Russo-Japanese War; World War I World War II

Production history
- Manufacturer: Elswick Ordnance Company; Royal Arsenal, Woolwich

Specifications
- Mass: 6.6 tons
- Barrel length: 240 inches (6.096 m) bore
- Shell: QF, separate cartridge and shell
- Shell weight: 100 pounds (45 kg)
- Calibre: 6-inch (152mm)
- Elevation: -5 / +20 degrees
- Traverse: +150 / -150 degrees
- Rate of fire: 5–7 rounds per minute
- Muzzle velocity: 2,154 feet per second (657 m/s); 820 feet per second (250 m/s) for anti-submarine shells
- Effective firing range: 10,000 yards (9,140 m) at 20°elevation; 15,000 yards (13,700 m) at 28°elevation

The QF 6-inch 40 calibre naval gun (Quick-Firing) was used by many United Kingdom-built warships around the end of the 19th century and the start of the 20th century. In British service it was known as the QF 6-inch Mk I, II, III guns. (Note: Mk I, II and III = Marks 1, 2 and 3. Britain used Roman numerals to denote Marks (models) of service ordnance until after the Second World War. This article describes the first three models of Royal Navy 6-inch QF guns.) As the 15 cm/40 (6") 41st Year Type naval gun it was used for pre-dreadnought battleships, armoured cruisers and protected cruisers of the early Imperial Japanese Navy built in UK and European shipyards. It was also the heaviest gun ever carried by a pre-Cold War destroyer.

== Design ==
=== QF technology ===
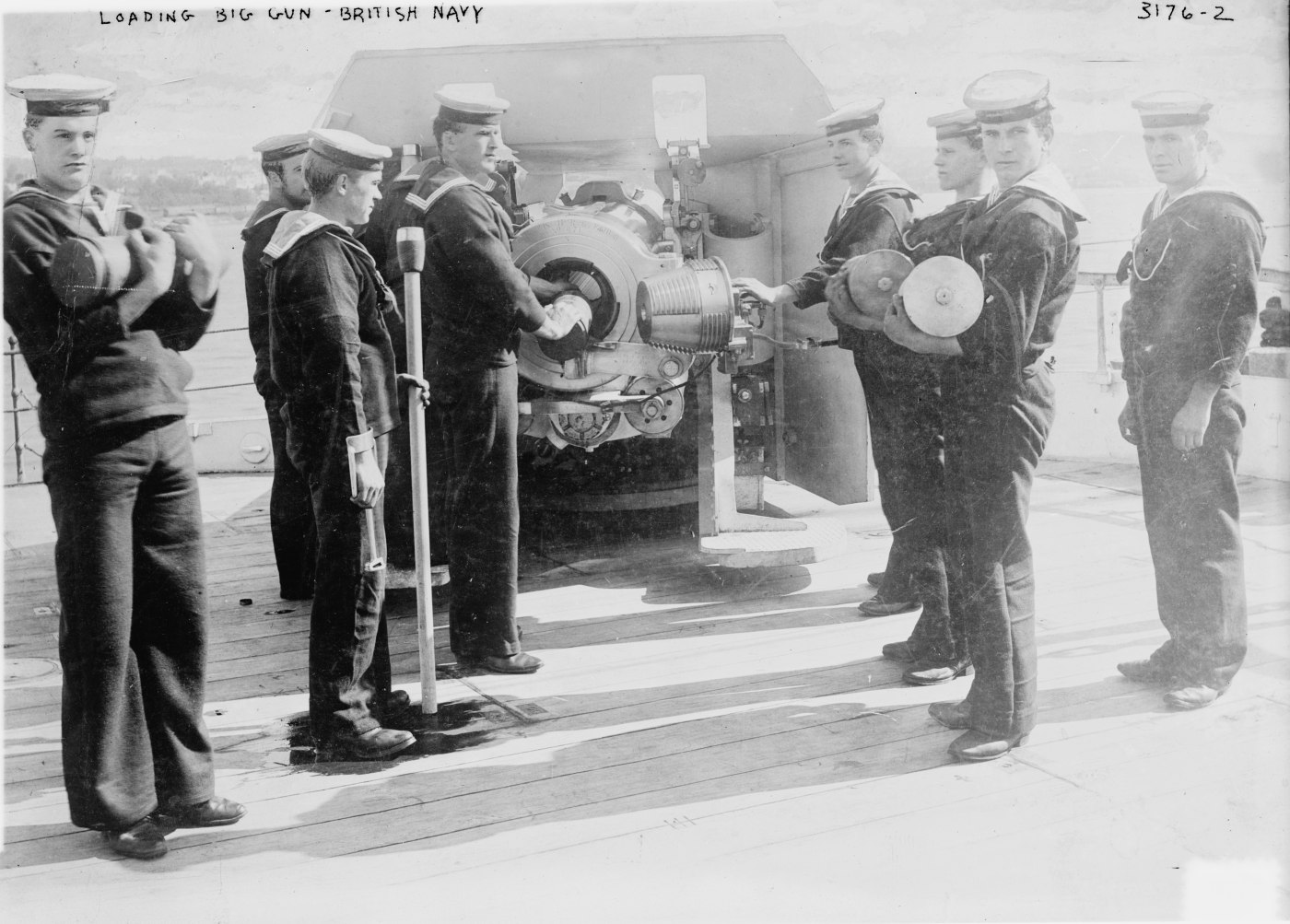
Loading a MK I or II deck gun on HMS Ariadne. The man at left holds a shell, the men at right hold brass powder cartridges. Note the coned breech screw and lugs on the underside of the breech ring to which recoil cylinders are attached

These guns were developed to exploit the new "QF" technology, which involved loading the propellant charge in a brass case with integrated primer in its base. This allowed a faster rate of fire than the older "Breech Loading" system, where the propellant was loaded in cloth bags and then a separate friction or percussion tube fitted into the breech for firing. The brass case sealed the breech, allowing a lighter mechanism, and at the same time disposed with the necessity of washing or sponging any smouldering fragments left from the previous shot, which could ignite the charge (then of black powder) prematurely. The QF principle had proved successful with the much smaller QF 3 pounder Hotchkiss and Nordenfelt QF 3- and 6-pounders from 1885 onwards, and with QF 4.7-inch Mk I – IV naval gun from 1886.

The Mk I was an Elswick gun of built up construction, which passed its trials on Elswick range near Silloth in the presence of Lord George Hamilton in October 1890. Mk II was built by Woolwich Arsenal and in 1891 became the first Royal Navy gun using the Armstrong wire-wound construction. The breech mechanisms were developed from the existing 6-inch (150 mm) BL mechanisms, but as it no longer had to provide obturation (sealing of the breech), the front was made coned rather than straight which allowed it to be swung round to the side before it was fully withdrawn, rather than having to be fully withdrawn before swinging to the side as with the BL gun.

=== Recoil system ===
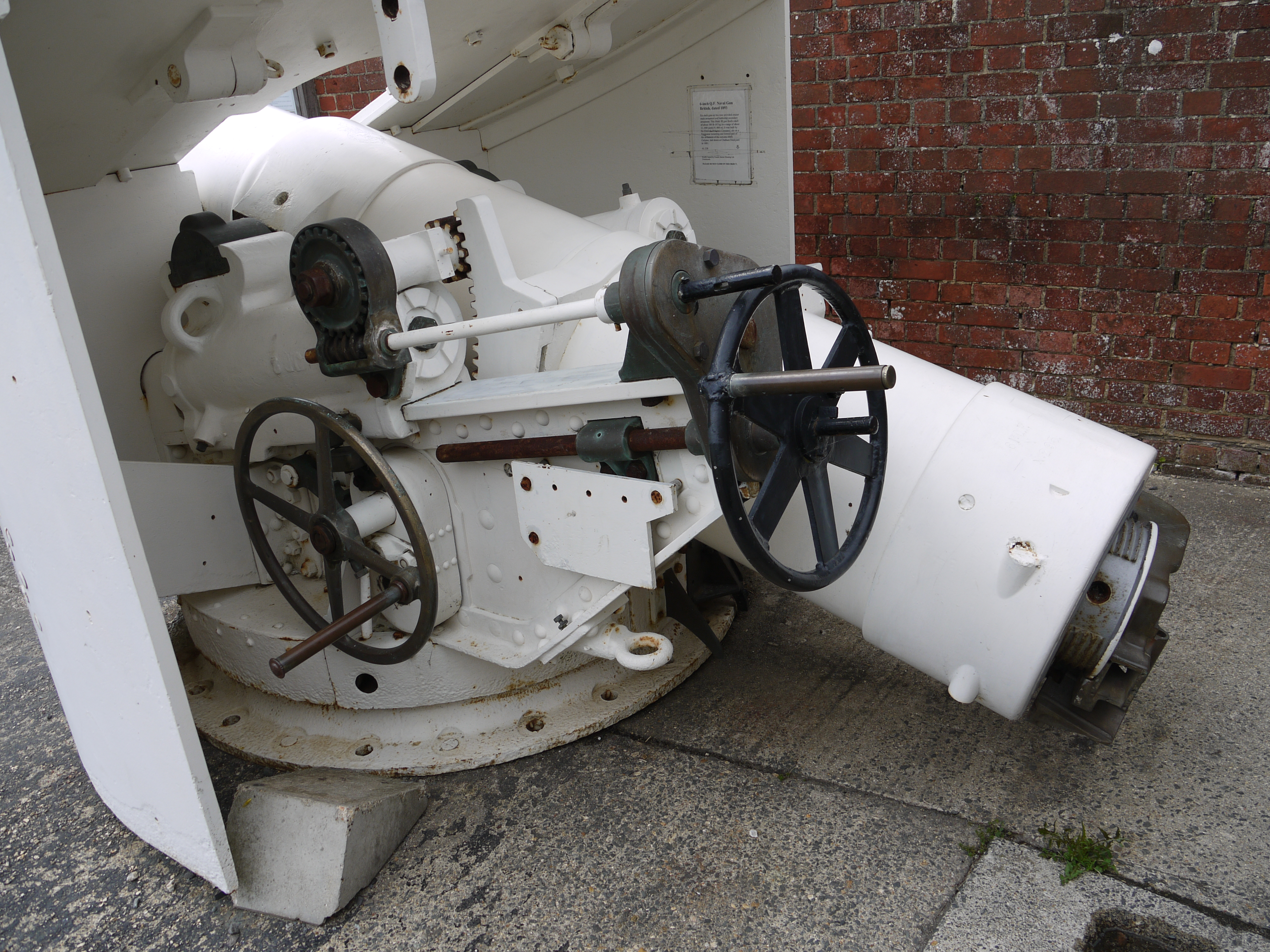
MK III gun at Fort Nelson. This shows the left trunnion (detailed in black) by which it is mounted on a Vavasseur recoil slide, and there are no lugs on the underside of the breech ring

The preceding generation of British 6-inch guns (BL Mks III, IV and VI) had old-style trunnions by which they were mounted on Vavasseur inclined slides to absorb recoil. QF Mk I and II dispensed with trunnions and instead on the lower side of the breech ring were lugs to which were attached modern recoil buffer and hydrospring recuperator (runout) cylinders to absorb recoil and return the barrel to loading position after firing. This allowed the gun to recoil directly backwards rather than backwards and upwards as previously and is the recoil system which in essence is still in use. Mk III was built by Elswick and was similar to Mk I except that it had trunnions which allowed it to be deployed on the remaining obsolescent but still in service Vavasseur recoil mountings. All 3 Marks had the same dimensions and performance.

== UK service ==
=== Royal Navy service ===
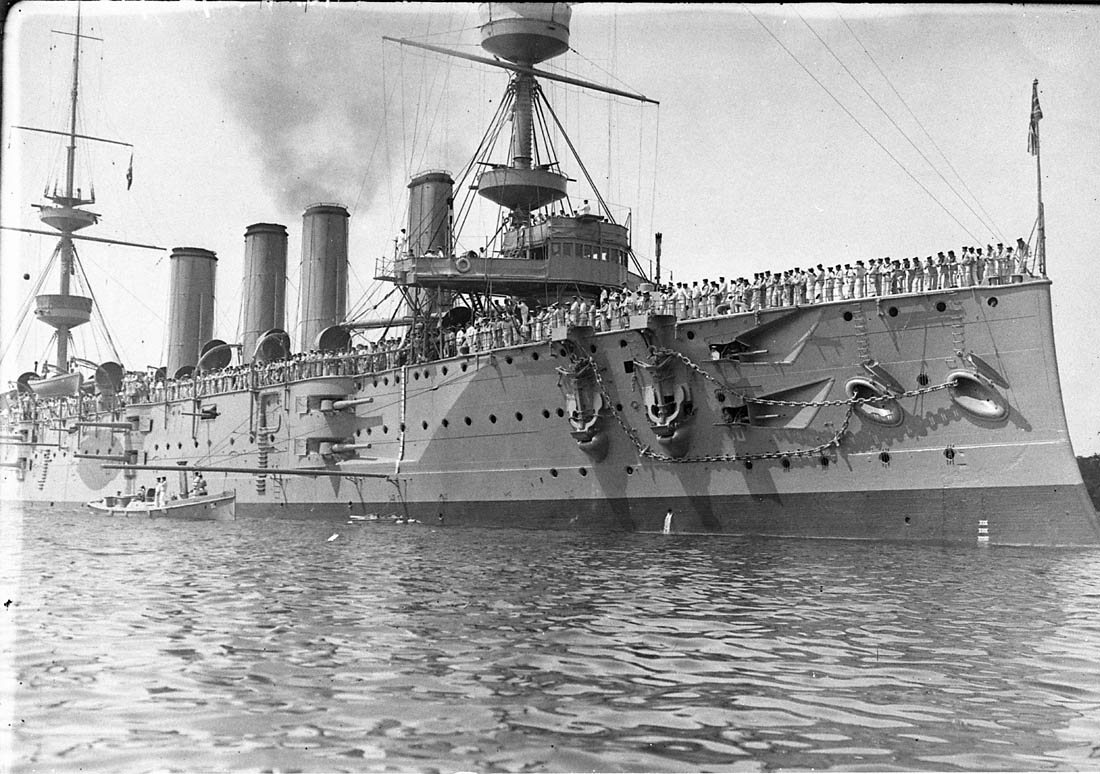
The 6 starboard casemate guns on HMS Powerful

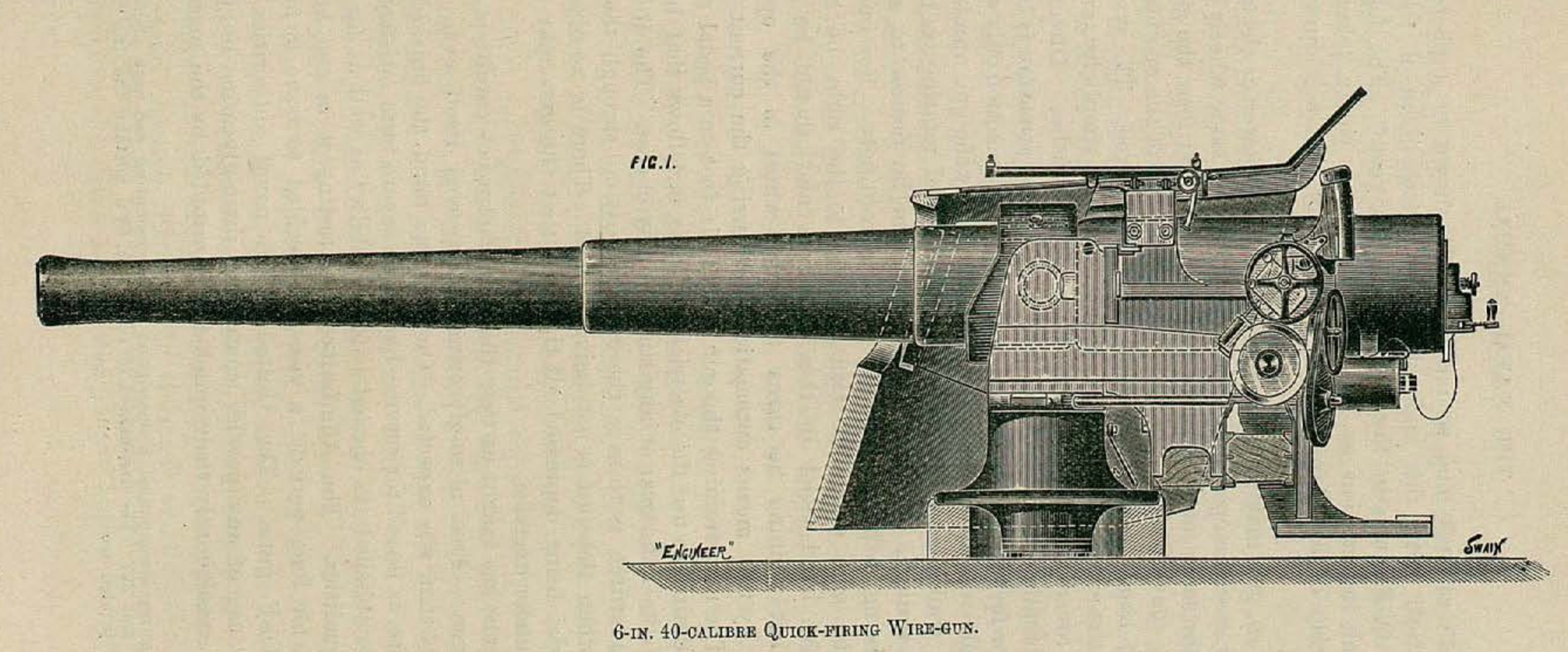
A diagram from Brassey's Naval Annual 1896

As the QF 6-inch Mk I, Mk II and Mk III, the gun was used as secondary armament of pre-dreadnoughts of the 1890s and cruisers to 1905. On the protected cruisers of the Diadem, Powerful and Edgar classes they made up most of the armament, though the latter class carried two 9.2-inch (230 mm) guns as well. The pre-dreadnought battleship classes of the Royal Sovereign-class (including the turreted HMS Hood-class, Centurion-class, Majestic-class and Canopus-class ships carried up to 12 guns.

=== Second Boer War land service ===
During the Second Boer War one gun was brought ashore from HMS Terrible in Natal in February 1900 at the request of General Redvers Buller, presumably in response to the failure at Colenso. It was mounted on an improvised field carriage by Captain Percy Scott and transported by rail to Chieveley, just south of Colenso. There it was manned by Royal Navy gunners to provide useful fire support for the British Army during the relief of Ladysmith. It is reported on 17 February to have fired from "Gun Hill" (a small kopje two miles (3 km) north of Chieveley) and knocked out a Boer gun at 16,500 yd (15,100 m), followed by a Boer searchlight, as Buller approached Ladysmith from the South East and pushed the Boers back towards the Tugela river. On 26 February Lieutenant Burne reports firing from the same position on a Boer gun at 15,000 yd (14,000 m) at 28° elevation and falling 200 yd (180 m) short. The 7-ton weight (compared to the 2½ tons of the Boer 155 mm "Long Tom") meant that it was effectively immobile on the battlefield and could not be moved forward to shorten the range. Two guns were also mounted on armoured trains, crewed by the Royal Garrison Artillery.

=== Coast defence gun ===
From 1894 a number of guns were adapted for coast defence use, with the original 3-motion breeches replaced by modern single-motion breeches to increase the rate of fire, which designated them as "B" guns. Nineteen guns were still active in the defence of the UK as at April 1918 : Jersey (2), Guernsey (2), Alderney (2), Shoeburyness (2), Blyth (2), Clyde Garrison (1), Mersey (2), Berehaven Garrison (Bantry Bay, Ireland) (6).

=== World War I anti-aircraft gun ===
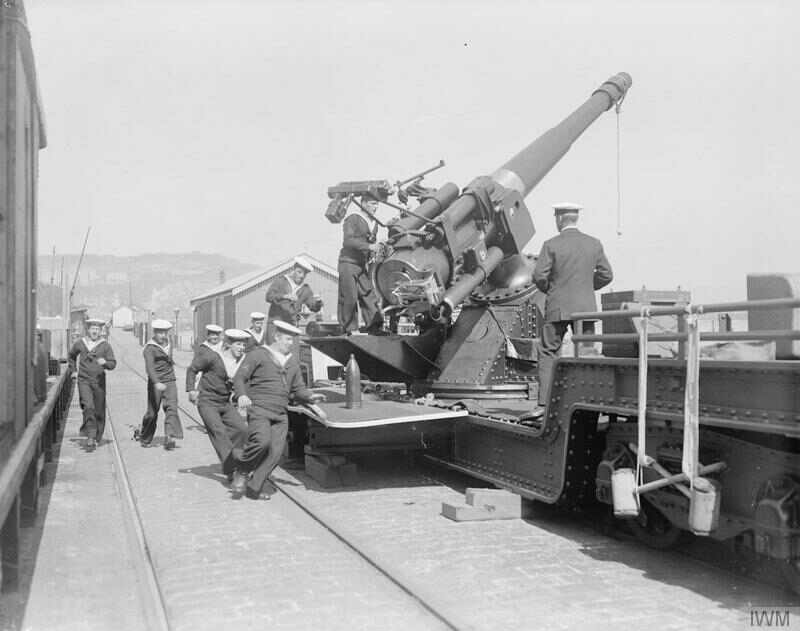
Anti-aircraft mounting on Prince of Wales Pier, Dover

At least one gun is known to have been mounted by the Royal Navy on an improvised anti-aircraft mounting on a railway truck, defending docks during the First World War.

=== Conversion to 8 inch (203 mm) howitzer ===
In World War I Britain urgently needed heavy artillery on the Western Front, and various obsolete 6-inch naval guns were converted to 8-inch howitzers. Sixty-three QF 6-inch Mk II guns were shortened, bored out to 8 in (200 mm) and converted to BL type to produce the BL 8-inch howitzer Mk V. Four entered service in December 1915 and 59 followed in 1916.

== Italian naval service ==
The Elswick export designation for guns sold to Italy and Japan was Pattern Z and Pattern Z1. In Italian service they were known as Cannone da 152/40 A Modello 1891. These guns armed armoured cruisers, ironclads, pre-dreadnought battleships, protected cruisers and scout cruisers of the Regia Marina. They served aboard Regia Marina ships in the Italo-Turkish War and World War I.

== Japanese naval service ==
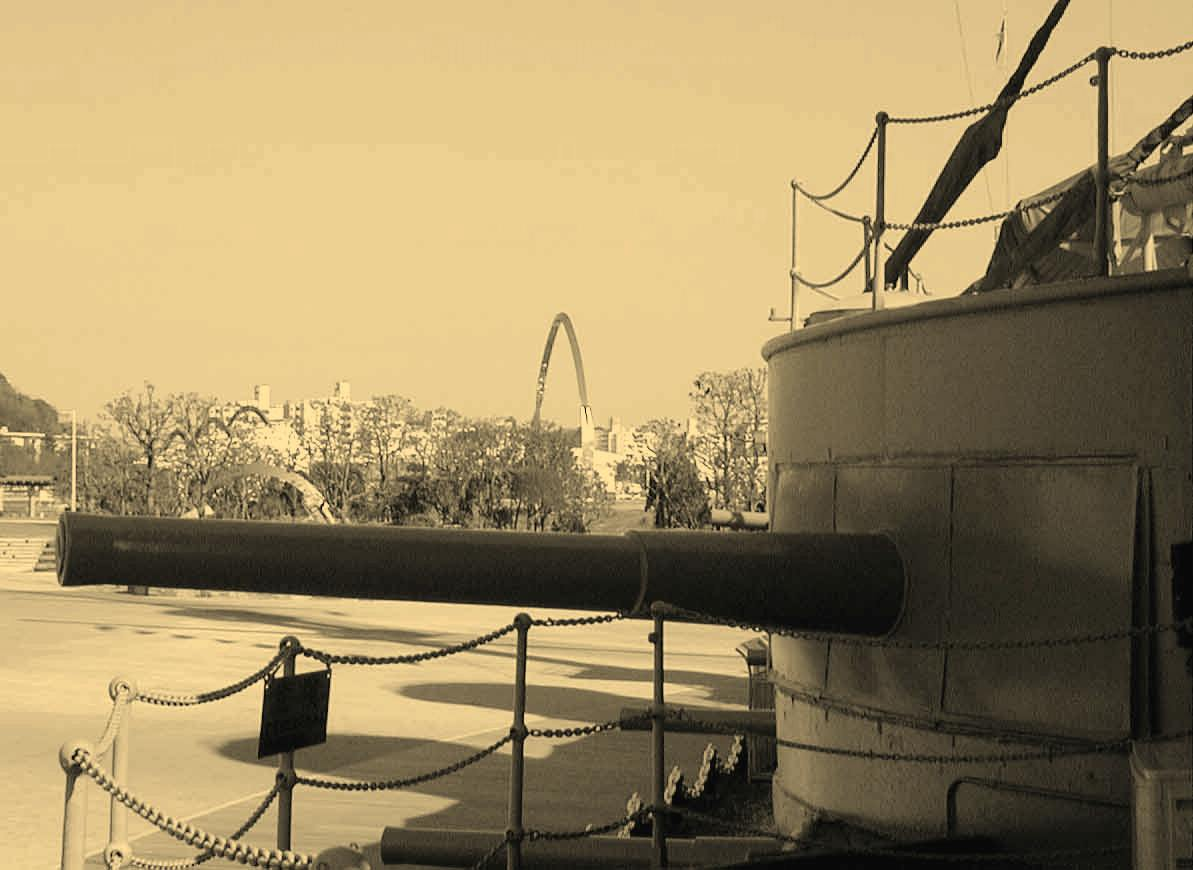
Type 41 6-inch (152 mm)/40 naval gun on Japanese battleship Mikasa

The Type 41 naval gun was designed by Armstrong Whitworth, Elswick, Newcastle upon Tyne, England as a slightly modified version of the Elswick Ordnance Company QF pattern 6-inch (150 mm) guns used on contemporary Royal Navy battleships. The Elswick export designation for guns sold to Italy and Japan was Pattern Z and Pattern Z1. They were the standard secondary armament on pre-dreadnought battleships and the main battery on several classes of armoured cruisers and protected cruisers of the Imperial Japanese Navy. They served aboard Japanese ships in the First Sino-Japanese War, Russo-Japanese War and World War I.

The gun was named "Type 41" from the 41st year of the reign of Emperor Meiji on 25 December 1908. It was further re-named in centimetres on 5 October 1917 as part of the standardisation process for the Imperial Japanese Navy converting to the metric system. The Type 41 6-inch (150 mm) gun fired a 100 lb (45 kg) shell with either an armour piercing, high explosive or general purpose warhead. An anti-submarine shell of 113 lb (51 kg) was developed and in service from 1943.

== Romanian naval service ==
Three guns were mounted on each of the two Romanian Aquila-class scout cruisers, Mărăști and Mărășești. The ships were reclassified as destroyers upon commissioning, despite retaining the 6-inch guns for the years to come, thus making the gun the heaviest artillery piece ever mounted on a pre-Cold War destroyer.

== US service ==
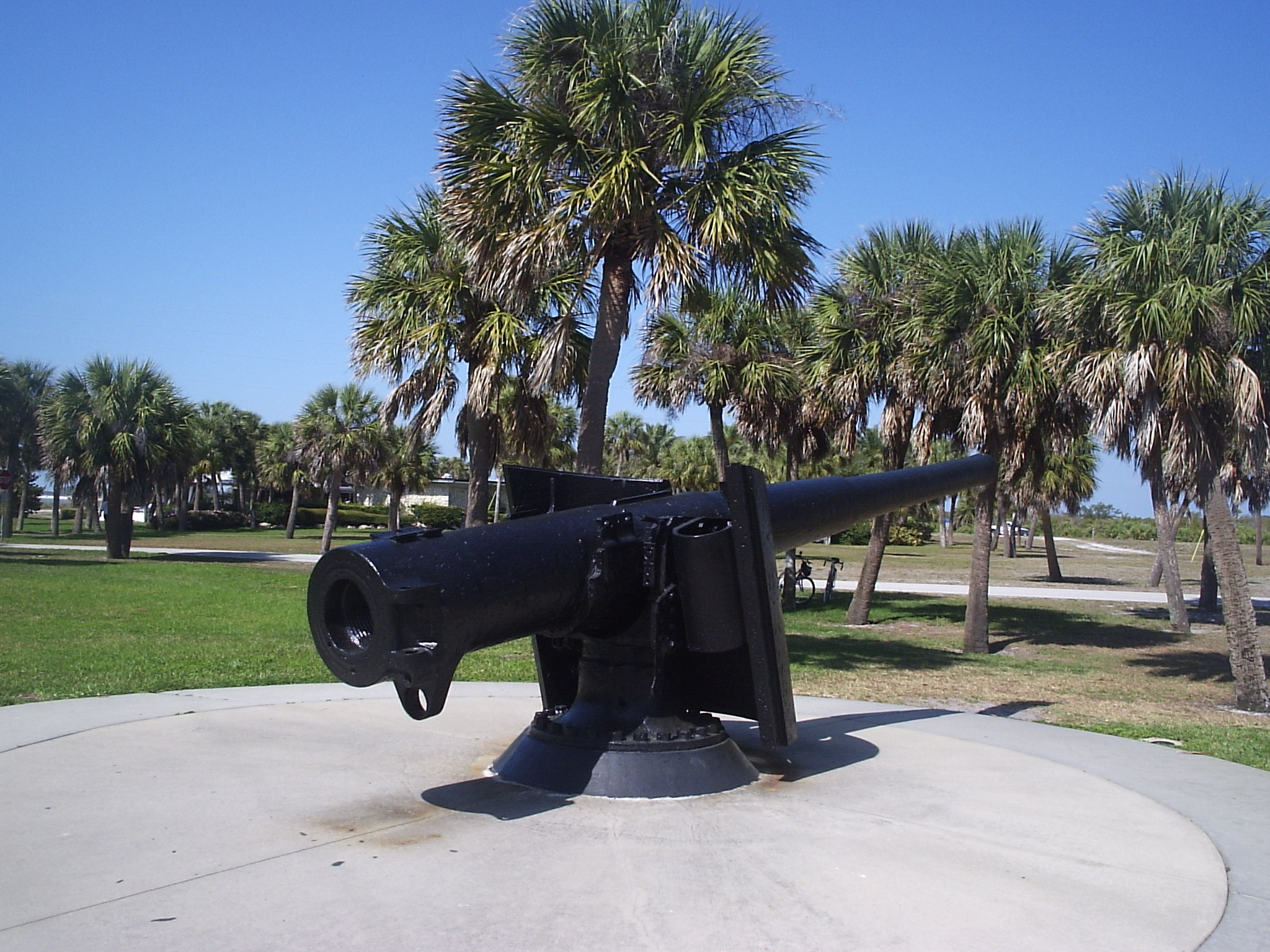
Gun relocated from Fort Dade to Fort DeSoto, Florida

These guns were adopted in very limited quantity by the United States Army Coast Artillery Corps as part of the Endicott period fortifications, and were initially mounted 1898–1907. They were acquired in 1898 due to the outbreak of the Spanish–American War. It was feared that the Spanish fleet would bombard US ports, and most of the Endicott forts were still years from completion. So the 6-inch guns, along with 34 4.7-inch Armstrong guns and 21 8-inch M1888 guns on 1870s carriages, were acquired to quickly arm some forts with modern quick-firing guns. They were designated as "6-inch Armstrong guns" and mounted on pedestals in US service, and appear to have been withdrawn from service by 1925. A total of nine guns were mounted in one-, two-, or three-gun batteries, with four of the nine transferred to Hawaii 1913–1917. Eight guns were initially at Fort Williams (Maine) (1), Fort Greble, Rhode Island (1), Fort Wadsworth, Staten Island, NY (2), Fort Moultrie, Charleston, South Carolina (1), Fort Screven, Tybee Island, Georgia (1), and Fort Dade, Tampa Bay, FL (2). The guns at Fort Greble and Fort Moultrie were dismounted in 1903-04. In 1907 three guns were mounted at Fort Adams, Rhode Island, probably the two dismounted guns plus one either newly acquired or from spares. The four guns from Fort Williams and Fort Adams were transferred to Ford Island, Pearl Harbor, Hawaii as Batteries Adair and Boyd beginning in 1913. The two from Fort Dade survive at Fort DeSoto near St. Petersburg, Florida. Their battery at Fort Dade has succumbed to tide action over the years.

== Canadian service ==
These guns were aboard HMS Niobe when the ship was transferred to Canada as HMCS Niobe in 1910.

== Surviving examples ==
- On board Japanese battleship Mikasa, Yokosuka, Japan
- Two coast defence guns at Fort DeSoto, Florida, USA.
- A Mk III gun and shield from HMS Calypso at Fort Nelson, Portsmouth, UK
- Two guns are on display at Howe Military Academy in Howe Indiana
- Two guns, originally from HMS Gibraltar, set up on the island of Vementry, Shetland during WW1 to defend the approach to Swarbacks Minn naval anchorage.

== See also ==
=== Weapons of comparable role, performance and era ===
- 15 cm SK L/40 naval gun German equivalent
- 6"/40 caliber gun US equivalent

== Bibliography ==
- Text Book of Gunnery, 1902. LONDON : PRINTED FOR HIS MAJESTY'S STATIONERY OFFICE, BY HARRISON AND SONS, ST. MARTIN'S LANE
- Berhow, Mark A., ed. (2004). American Seacoast Defenses, A Reference Guide (Second ed.). CDSG Press. ISBN 0-9748167-0-1.
- Tony Bridgland, "Field Gun Jack Versus the Boers: The Royal Navy in South Africa 1899–1900". Leo Cooper, 1998. ISBN 0-85052-580-2
- Brown, D. K. (2003). Warrior to Dreadnought: Warship Development 1860–1905. Book Sales. ISBN 1-84067-529-2.
- Brown, D. K. (2003). The Grand Fleet: Warship Design and Development 1906–1922. Caxton Editions. ISBN 978-1-84067-531-3.
- Lieutenant C. R. N. Burne R.N., With the Naval Brigade in Natal (1899–1900). London: Edward Arnold, 1902
- Dale Clarke, British Artillery 1914–1919. Heavy Artillery. Osprey Publishing, Oxford UK, 2005 ISBN 1-84176-788-3
- General Sir Martin Farndale, History of the Royal Regiment of Artillery : Forgotten Fronts and the Home Base 1914–18. London:The Royal Artillery Institution, 1988
- Gardiner, Robert; Lambert, Andrew, eds. (2001). Steam, Steel and Shellfire: The Steam Warship, 1815–1905. Conway's History of the Ship. Book Sales. ISBN 978-0-7858-1413-9.
- Major Darrell Hall, "THE NAVAL GUNS IN NATAL 1899–1902" The South African Military History Society Military History Journal – Vol 4 No 3, June 1978
- Hodges, Peter (1981). The Big Gun: Battleship Main Armament, 1860–1945. United States Naval Institute Press. ISBN 0-87021-917-0.
- I.V. Hogg & L.F. Thurston, British Artillery Weapons & Ammunition 1914–1918. London: Ian Allan, 1972.
- Parkes, Oscar (1990). British Battleships. first published Seeley Service & Co, 1957, published United States Naval Institute Press. ISBN 1-55750-075-4.
- Admiral Percy Scott, "Fifty Years in the Royal Navy" published 1919
- "Instructions for Mounting, Using, and Caring for 6-inch Rapid-Fire Gun, Armstrong", 1903, revised 1908, reprinted 1917, Washington: Government Printing Office
