= MEU =

MEU or meu, may refer to:

== Places ==
- Meu, Brittany, France; a river
- Meux, Wallonia (Walloon: Meu), La Bruyère, Belgium; a town and former municipality
- Middle East University (Jordan), Amman, Lebanon; a non-profit institution
- Middle East University (Lebanon), Beirut, Lebanon; a Christian university

== Other uses ==
- Marine Expeditionary Unit, a military task force
- Meum athamanticum, a herb commonly known as 'meu'
- Model European Union, a politics education exercise
- A Dictionary of Modern English Usage, the style guide by H.W. Fowler (or any of its posthumous editions)
- Motu language (ISO 639-3 language code: meu)

== See also ==
- Middle East University (disambiguation)
- MEV (disambiguation)
- Mew (disambiguation)
- Meux (disambiguation)
