= HMS Terrible (1895) =

British Powerful-class cruiser

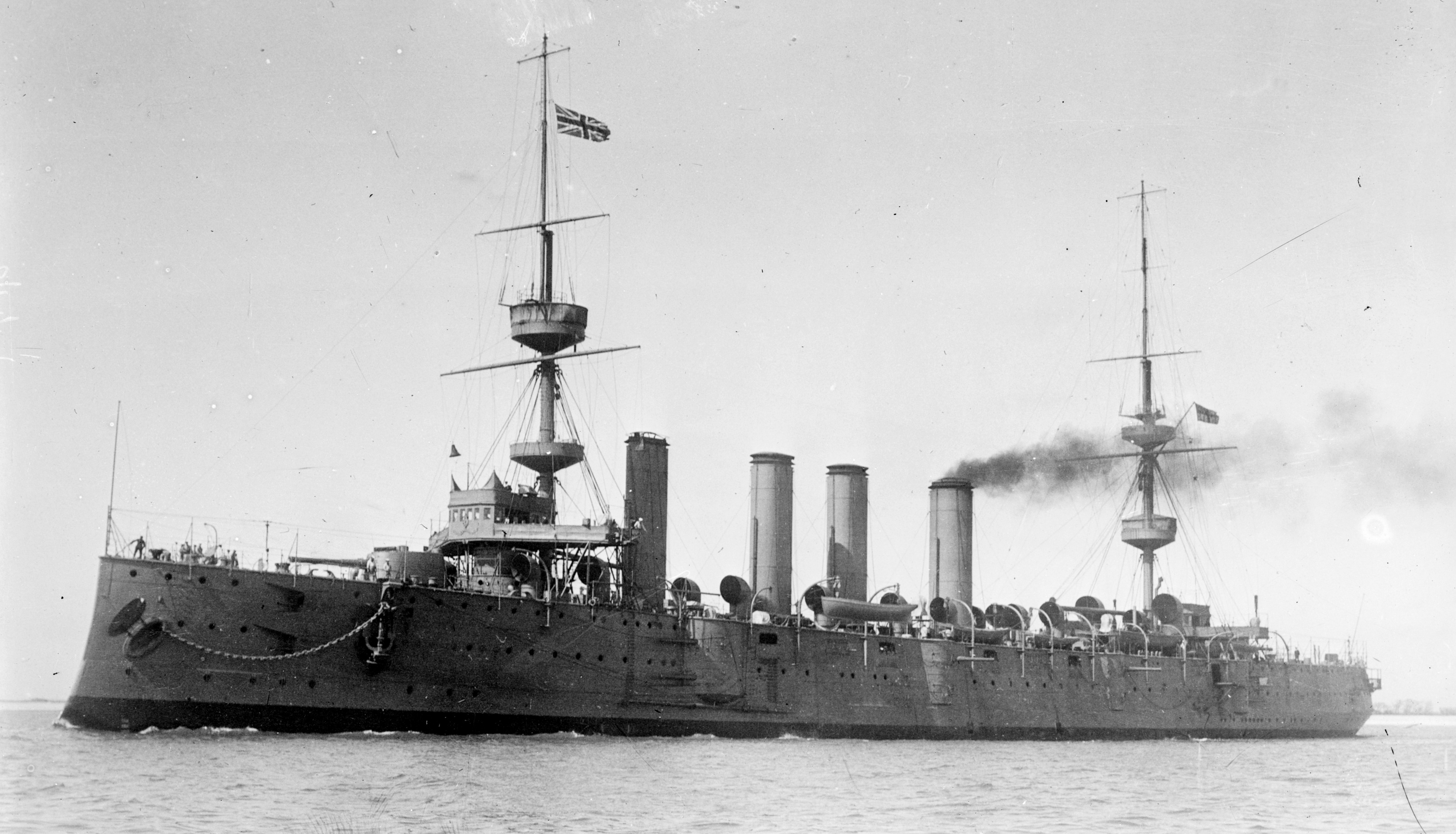
- HMS Terrible at an unknown date

History

United Kingdom
- Name: Terrible
- Builder: J. & G. Thomson, Clydebank
- Laid down: 21 February 1894
- Launched: 27 May 1895
- Completed: 24 March 1898
- Renamed: Fisgard III, August 1920
- Reclassified: Training ship, August 1920
- Fate: Sold for scrap, July 1932

General characteristics (as built)
- Class & type: Powerful-class protected cruiser
- Displacement: 14,200 long tons (14,400 t) (normal)
- Length: 538 ft (164.0 m) (o/a)
- Beam: 71 ft (21.6 m)
- Draught: 27 ft (8.2 m)
- Installed power: 25,000 ihp (19,000 kW); 48 × Belleville boilers
- Propulsion: 2 × shafts; 2 × triple-expansion steam engines
- Speed: 22 knots (41 km/h; 25 mph)
- Range: 7,000 nmi (13,000 km; 8,100 mi) at 14 knots (26 km/h; 16 mph)
- Complement: 894 (designed); 799 (1916)
- Armament: 2 × single 9.2 in (234 mm) guns; 12 × single 6 in (152 mm) guns; 16 × single 12-pdr (3 in (76 mm) guns; 12 × single 3-pdr (47 mm (1.9 in)) guns; 4 × 18 in (450 mm) torpedo tubes
- Armour: Deck: 2.5–4 in (64–102 mm); Barbettes: 6 in (152 mm); Turrets: 6 in (152 mm); Conning tower: 12 in (305 mm); Casemates: 2–6 in (51–152 mm)

HMS Terrible was the second and last of the Powerful-class protected cruisers built for the Royal Navy (RN) in the 1890s. She served on the China Station and provided landing parties and guns which participated in the Siege and Relief of Ladysmith in the Second Boer War in South Africa. A few months later she did much the same thing to help suppress the Boxer Rebellion in China. During this time, her captain was Percy Scott, who trained his crew to a high standard in gunnery and had his training methods adopted by the entire Royal Navy.

Upon Terrible's return home in 1902, she was refitted for two years and was then placed in reserve, sporadically being activated to ferry replacements to China, escort a royal tour to India or participate in fleet manoeuvres. The ship served as an accommodation ship from 1909 to 1913. In July 1914, the month before First World War erupted, she was offered for sale. Thus, the offer was withdrawn, and she subsequently made one voyage as a troop transport in 1915 before becoming a depot ship. Terrible was assigned as a training ship in 1918 before being hulked and converted to suit the role two years later. The ship was sold for scrap in July 1932 and demolished several months later.

== Design and description ==
The Powerful-class cruiser was designed to counter the Russian armoured cruiser Rurik which had been designed as a long-range commerce raider. This required long range and high speed to catch the Russian ship. The ships displaced 14,200 long tons (14,400 t) at normal load. They had an overall length of 538 feet (164.0 m), a beam of 71 feet (21.6 m) and a draught of 27 feet (8.2 m). The ships were powered by a pair of four-cylinder triple-expansion steam engines, each driving one propeller shaft, using steam provided by 48 Belleville boilers. The engines were designed to produce a total of 25,000 indicated horsepower (19,000 kW) using forced draught and gave a maximum speed of 22 knots (41 km/h; 25 mph). Terrible reached a maximum speed of 22.4 knots (41.5 km/h; 25.8 mph) from 25,572 ihp (19,069 kW) during her sea trials. She carried enough coal to give her a range of 7,000 nautical miles (13,000 km; 8,100 mi) at 14 knots (26 km/h; 16 mph) and her complement consisted of 894 officers and ratings.

The main armament of the Powerful-class cruisers consisted of two 9.2-inch (234 mm) Mk VIII guns in single gun turrets, one each fore and aft of the superstructure. Her secondary armament of a dozen 6-inch (152 mm) Mk I or II guns was arranged in casemates amidships. The end casemates were the first two-storey (guns on the main and upper decks) casemates in the RN. For defence against torpedo boats, sixteen 12-pounder 3-inch (76 mm) 12-cwt (Note: "Cwt" is the abbreviation for hundredweight, 12 cwt referring to the weight of the gun.) guns and a dozen 3-pounder (47 mm (1.9 in)) Hotchkiss guns were fitted. Two additional 12-pounder 8-cwt guns could be dismounted for service ashore. The ships also mounted four submerged 18-inch (450 mm) torpedo tubes, a pair on each broadside.

With the exception of the barbettes, all of the protective plating of the cruisers was Harvey armour. The curved protective deck ranged in thickness from 2.5–4 inches (64–102 mm) and the conning tower was protected by 12 inches (305 mm). The armour of the gun turrets, their barbettes and the casemates was 6 inches thick. The casemates had 2-inch (51 mm) backs.

== Construction and career ==
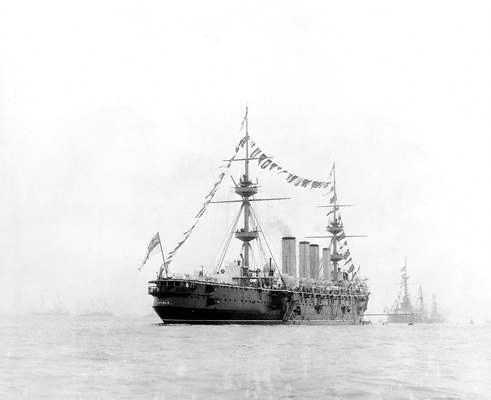
Terrible at Queen Victoria's Diamond Jubilee Fleet Review, July 1897

Terrible was laid down by J. & G. Thomson in their Clydebank shipyard on 21 February 1894 and launched on 27 May 1895. The ship arrived at H. M. Dockyard, Portsmouth on 4 June to be fitted out. She was temporarily commissioned in July 1897 to participate in the fleet review commemorating Queen Victoria's Diamond Jubilee. Terrible was commissioned for active service on 24 March 1898. In May, she ferried the First Lord, George Goschen, and the Civil Lord of the Admiralty, Austen Chamberlain, to Gibraltar and Malta. While transporting relief crews for the Mediterranean Fleet to Malta in December, the ship set a record, taking 121 hours to cover 2,206 nmi (4,086 km; 2,539 mi) despite heavy weather in the Bay of Biscay. During the Portsmouth to Gibraltar leg she averaged 18 knots (33 km/h; 21 mph) from 12,500 ihp (9,300 kW) and 21.5 knots (39.8 km/h; 24.7 mph) from Gibraltar to Malta.

On 13 March 1899, a boiler explosion while underway en route to England killed one stoker and injured three others, who were discharged to hospital on arrival. The inquest identified that the use of salt water caused extensive corrosion and blockages in the boiler tubes, seven of which consequently burst due to overheating.

=== Boer War and Boxer Rebellion ===
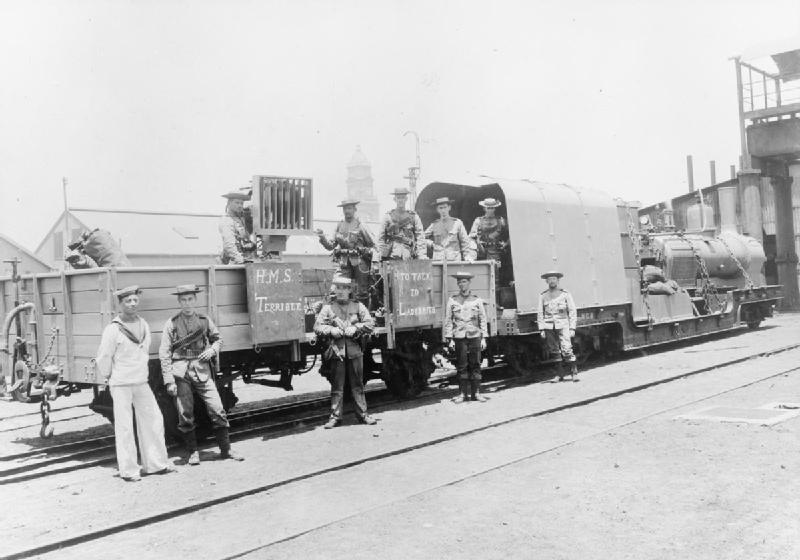
Scott's improvised signal light

Captain Percy Scott assumed command on 18 September 1899, with orders to take the ship for service on the China Station. Expecting hostilities to break out in South Africa, Scott persuaded the Admiralty to allow him to make passage via the Cape of Good Hope rather than the originally planned Suez Canal route. Terrible arrived at Simonstown on 14 October to find war imminent. With no threat from the sea, Scott set about determining how he might adapt the navy's guns by mounting them on wheels for use on land as to support the army which lacked any long-range artillery and found that its ordinary guns were out-ranged by the Boer artillery. The mountings looked somewhat amateurish, causing the authorities to regard them with considerable suspicion. However, they proved very effective and the role of two of his 4.7-inch (120 mm) guns at the siege of Ladysmith received quite a bit of publicity. Terrible arrived at Durban on 6 November and Scott was appointed Military Commandant there the following day. A naval brigade from the Terrible accompanied the Ladysmith relief force, including two 4.7-inch and eighteen 12-pounder guns, and participated in the battles of Colenso (December 1899) and Spion Kop (January 1900) and the relief of Ladysmith on 28 February. Scott also adapted a small searchlight as a signal light mounted on a train to communicate with the besieged force in Ladysmith. After the relief of Ladysmith, Terrible's crew rejoined her and she departed Durban on 27 March 1900 en route to China.

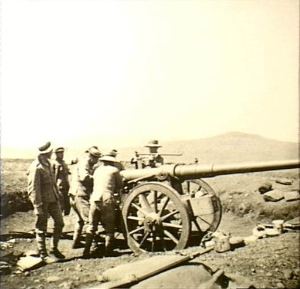
A 12-pounder gun on one of Scott's carriages in Natal, South Africa

She arrived at Hong Kong on 8 May and Scott mounted four 12-pounders on field carriages later that month, once he became aware that Terrible and her crew would be ordered north to assist British forces against the anti-foreigner movement known as the Boxers. Orders arrived on 15 June that Terrible was to load three companies of the Royal Welsh Fusiliers and sail to Taku where she arrived on the 21st. A single 12-pounder gun accompanied the relief force that reached the foreign quarter of Tianjin on 24 June. The other three guns accompanied the expedition that defeated the Chinese forces in the city of Tianjin in mid-July. All four guns were part of the second relief expedition to Beijing in August and her crewmen returned to the ship on 7 September. After hostilities ceased Scott focused to working up his ship's gunnery capabilities, devising various training aids, and her crew shot a very respectable score of 78.8% in the 1900 prize firing. Terrible arrived in Hong Kong on 17 December after a typhoon had struck the city, and Scott volunteered to salvage the capsized dredger Canton River. Work began the following month and Scott succeeded two months later. In the Navy's 1901 prize firing Terrible achieved a score of 80%, the best of any ship in the Navy.

In early 1902 Terrible spent several months at Hong Kong, providing relief and condensed water for the dockyard, amid an outbreak of cholera in the city leading to a water famine. In July 1902 Scott received orders to return with his ship to Britain, and after visits to Colombo and Aden, passed via the Suez Canal to the Mediterranean where she visited Malta and Gibraltar before she returned to Portsmouth on 19 September. On her return, 700 of her officers and men were hosted to a public dinner in Portsmouth, before she was paid off on 24 October to begin a long refit at Messrs. John Brown and Co.′s works at Clydebank. During this refit, the RN added four 6-inch guns in casemates amidships, although no additional ammunition could be accommodated in the ship.

=== Later career ===
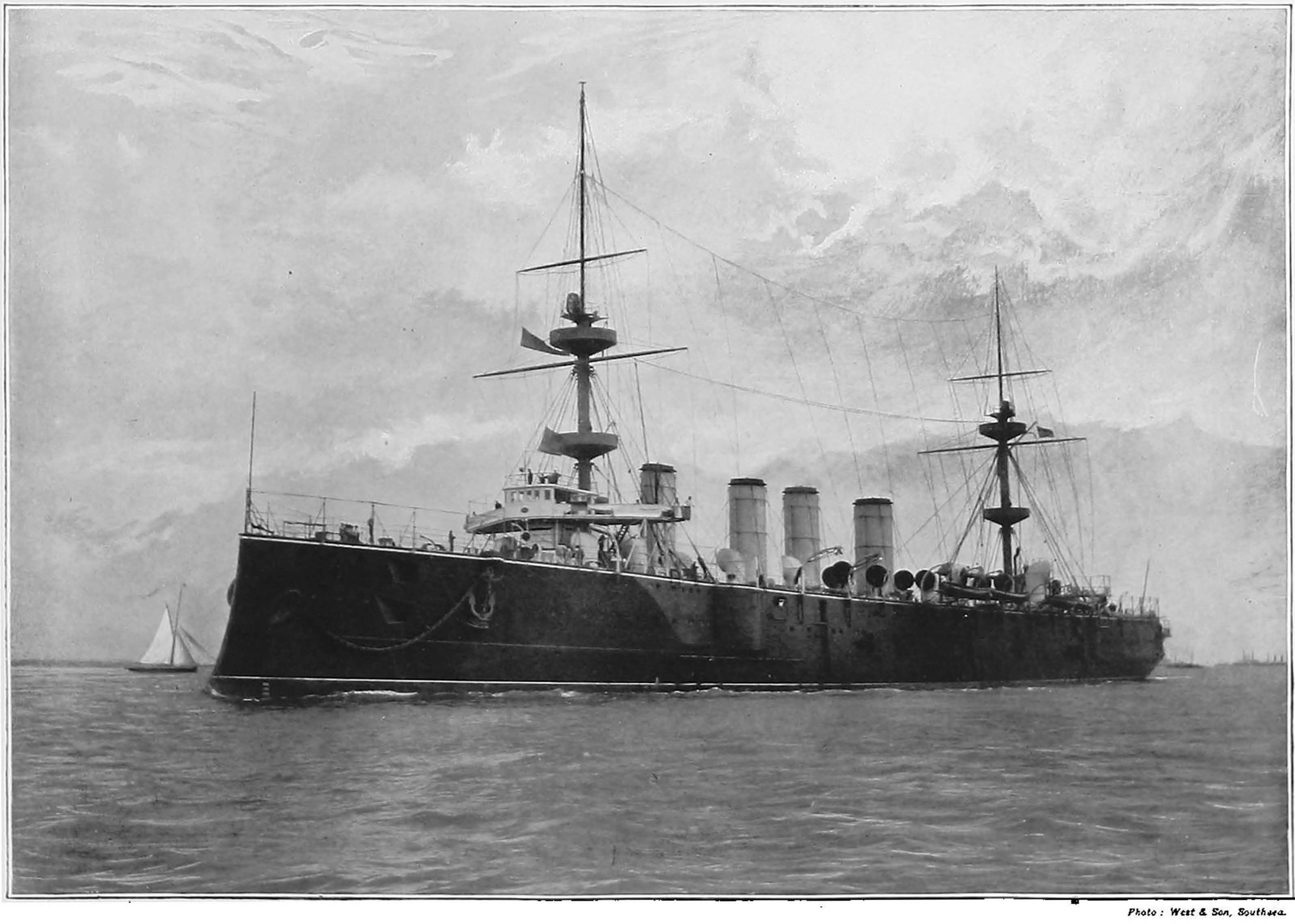
A drawing of Terrible

Terrible recommissioned on 24 June 1904 for special service and took out relief crews to the China Station, returning in December. She was paid off again on the 22nd, but was assigned to the reserve on 3 January 1905. The ship was activated in August to escort the battleship Renown carrying the Prince and Princess of Wales—the future King George V and Queen Mary—during their tour of India and returned home in early 1906. Terrible served as the temporary flagship of the 6th Cruiser Squadron during the annual manoeuvres in June and July and returned to reserve afterwards. She was reactivated on 7 November to ferry relief crews to China, losing a propeller on the return trip, and finished the voyage on one engine. The ship was refitted from 4 May 1908 to 1 April 1909 and was assigned to the Fourth Division of the Home Fleet upon its completion. Terrible was primarily used as an accommodation ship from 20 July until she was transferred to Pembroke Dock on 6 December 1913. The ship was listed for disposal in July 1914, but this was cancelled when the First World War began shortly afterwards.

Terrible was recommissioned in September 1915 to transport troops to the Dardanelles and her 9.2-inch guns were removed. She reached Mudros on 2 October and became a depot ship at Portsmouth upon her return. The ship was assigned as tender to HMS Vernon in January 1918 and then to HMS Fisgard a year later. In September 1919 Terrible was hulked, disarmed and had most of her propulsion machinery removed to convert her into a training ship for engineering apprentices. When the conversion was completed in August 1920, she was renamed Fisgard III. When Fisgard moved to accommodations ashore, the ship was listed for sale in January 1932 and was purchased in July by John Cashmore Ltd. She was towed to Newport, Wales in September and broken up. Parts of her teak would later be made into souvenirs and sold off.
