= Markko =

Markko may refer to:

- Markko Märtin, Estonian rally driver
- Markko Rivera, fictional character on ABC's daytime drama One Life to Live.
- Markko Vineyards, winery founded in Conneaut, Ohio.
