= Henry Marku =

English footballer (born 2000)

Personal information
- Date of birth: 14 February 2000 (age 26)
- Place of birth: London, England
- Height: 1.92 m (6 ft 4 in)
- Position: Defensive midfielder

Youth career
- Tottenham
- Queens Park Rangers
- Fulham
- 2018–2019: Oxhey Jets

Senior career*
Years	Team	Apps	(Gls)
2018–2019	Oxhey Jets		
2019	Wingate & Finchley	3	(0)
2019–2020	New Salamis	15	(3)
2021–2022	Elbasani	16	(1)
2022–2024	Korabi	50	(3)
2024–2026	Tirana	21	(0)
- * Club domestic league appearances and goals as of 22 August 2025

Henry Marku (born 14 February 2000) is an English footballer who plays as a defensive midfielder.
