= Naval brigade =

Type of military formation

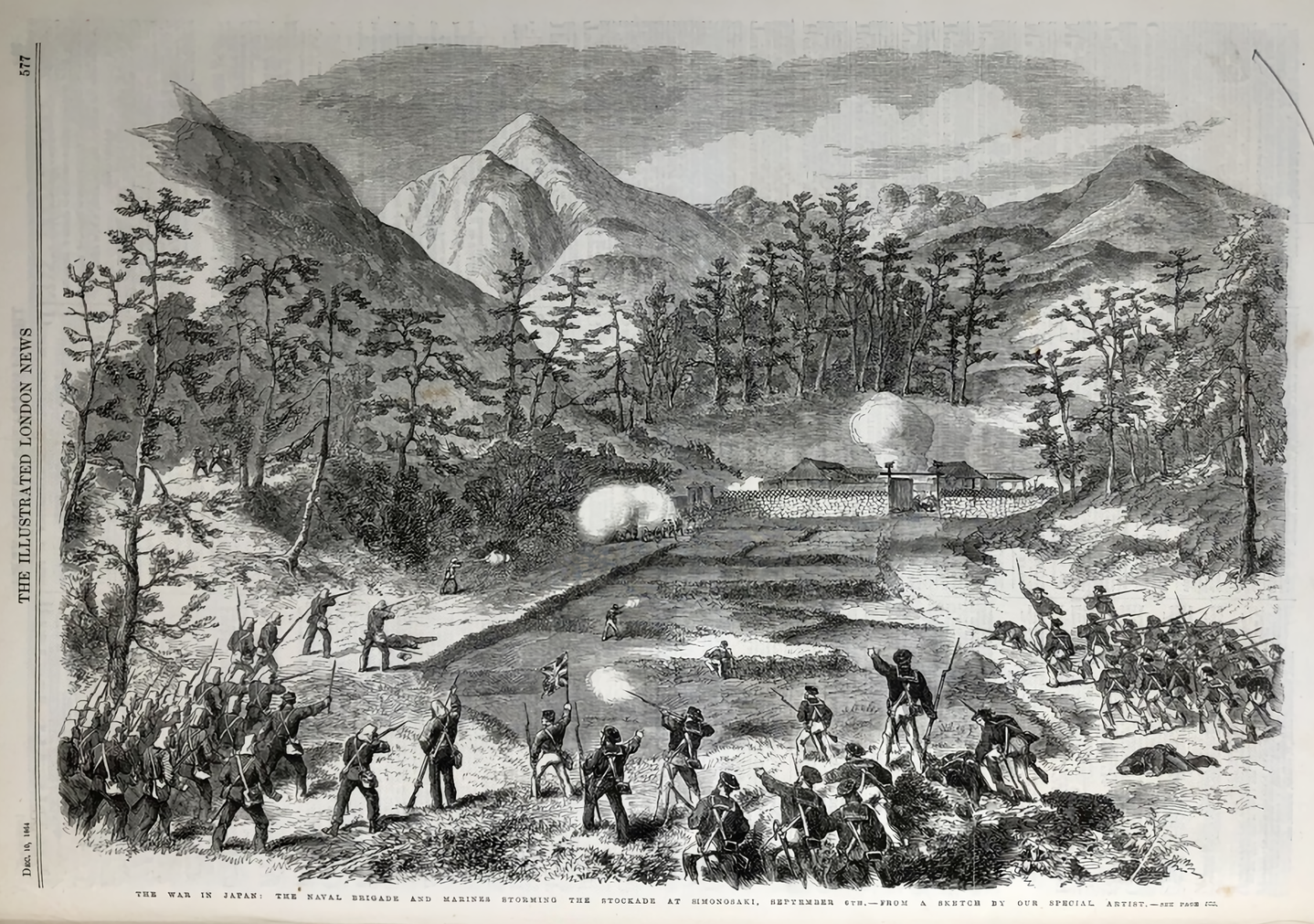
A British naval brigade (right) during the Shimonoseki campaign in September 1864

A naval brigade is a body of sailors serving in a ground combat role to augment land forces.

== Australia ==
Prior to the Federation of Australia, several of the Australian colonies had their own Naval Brigades with New South Wales also having a separate Naval Artillery Volunteers who manned coast artillery. These units took part in the suppression of the Boxer Rebellion in China.

== Germany ==
During the German Revolution of 1918–19, mutineering sailors of the Imperial German Navy formed the Volksmarinedivision, the best-trained and organised force available to the revolutionary socialists. They defeated regular army troops and battled the right-wing Freikorps over the direction of postwar Germany.

== Russia ==
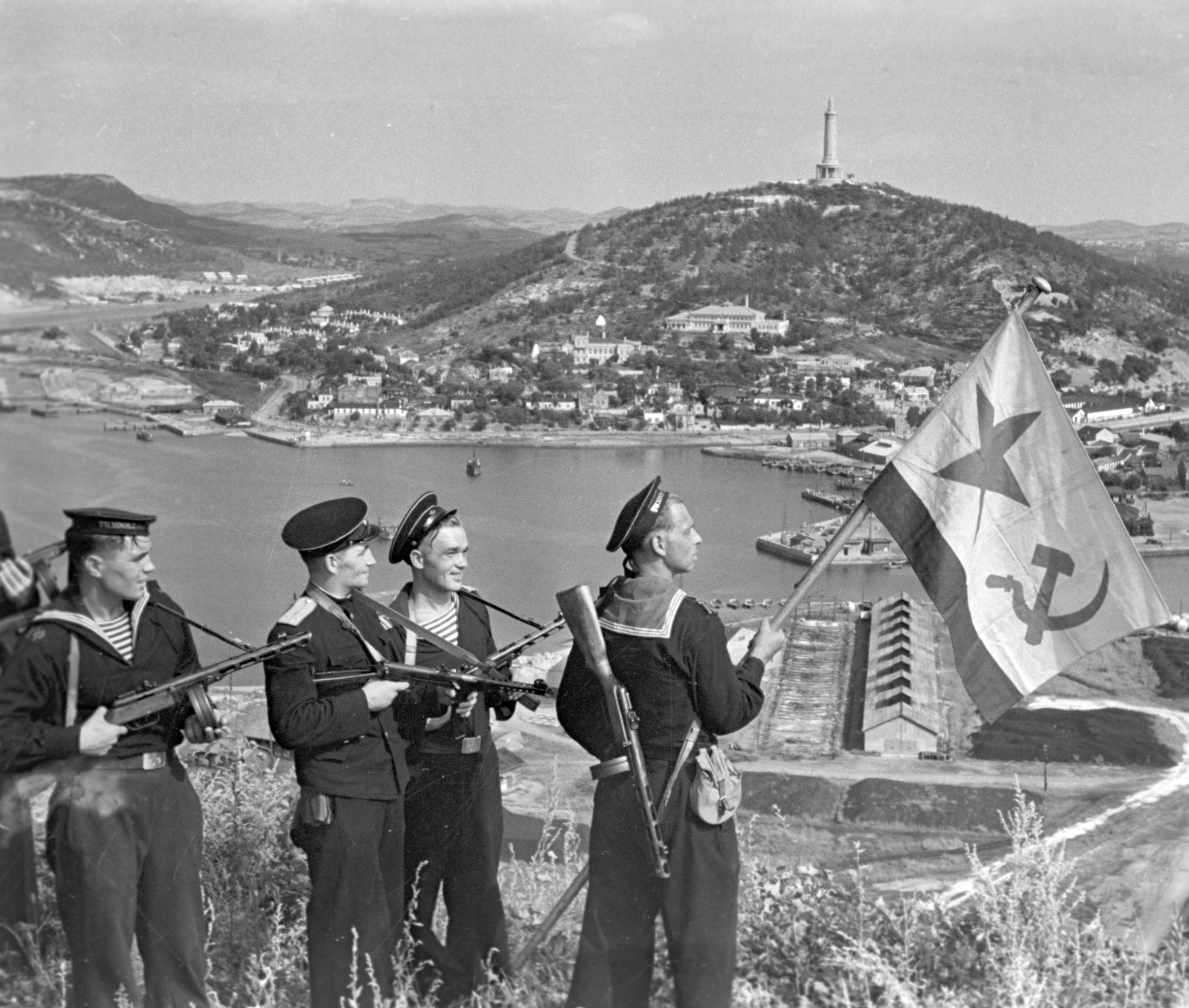
Soviet sailors at Port Arthur, 1945

During the October Revolution and Russian Civil War, Bolshevik sailors were involved in storming the Winter Palace. When the Nazis invaded Russia, sailors were diverted from the battleships to aid in the defence of Leningrad and Sevastopol. Throughout the war, Russian naval infantry distinguished themselves in land combat, and eventually earned special forces status.

== United Kingdom ==
Within the Royal Navy, a naval brigade is a large temporary detachment of Royal Marines and of seamen from the Royal Navy formed to undertake operations on shore, particularly during the mid- to late-19th century. Seamen were specifically trained in land-based warfare at the gunnery school at HMS Excellent in Portsmouth.

The Royal Navy fought only one ship-to-ship action (HMS Shah and Amethyst against the Peruvian ship Huascar in 1877) between 1850 and 1914, so, for much of that period, its only active service was on shore, through naval brigades formed from the men aboard its vessels. Naval brigades were used in engagements including:

- the Battle of Bunker Hill (1775)
- the Invasion of Isle de France (1810)
- the Anglo-Burmese Wars (1824–1885)
- the Crimean War (1854–1856)
- the Second Opium War (1856–1860)
- the Indian Rebellion of 1857 (1857–1858)
- the New Zealand Wars (1860–1864)
- the Bombardment of Kagoshima and Shimonoseki campaign (1863–1864)
- the British expedition to Abyssinia (1867–1868)
- the Second Anglo-Ashanti War (1873–1874)
- the Anglo-Zulu War (1879)
- the First Boer War (1881)
- the Anglo-Egyptian War (1882)
- the Mahdist War (1884–5)
- the Benin Expedition of 1897
- the Second Boer War (1899–1902)
- the Boxer Rebellion (1900)

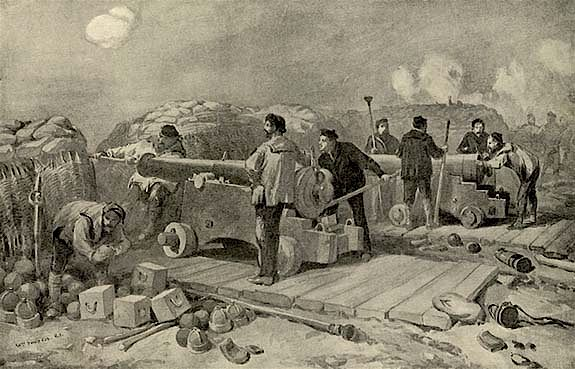
Naval brigade guns and gunners at the siege of Sevastopol (1854–1855), during the Crimean War

The field gun competition commemorates the participation of a naval brigade in the relief of Ladysmith during the Boer War, when 12-pounder guns from HMS Terrible and Powerful were dragged across almost 200 mi (320 km) of rough terrain from Durban in October 1899.

A Royal Naval Division—later designated the 63rd (Royal Naval) Division—was formed in the First World War to make use of surplus reserves of the Royal Navy who were not required at sea. It included two naval brigades and a brigade of Royal Marines, and fought in the defence of Antwerp in 1914, the Battle of Gallipoli in 1915, and the Battle of the Somme in 1916. Few naval personnel remained in the Division by July 1916, and it was redesignated as the 63rd Division. The division was demobilised in April 1919.

== United States ==
During the siege of Veracruz of 1847 in the Mexican–American War, a naval contingent of 1200 men joined the landing force.

During the American Civil War, both sides employed naval brigades at the siege of Petersburg. The Confederate naval brigade was commanded by Captain John R. Tucker. It was attached to George Washington Custis Lee's Division, under Lieutenant General Richard Ewell's Richmond Defense Forces. During the retreat to Appomattox, the brigade was captured at the Battle of Sayler's Creek on 6 April 1865. s. The Union naval brigade was under the Army of the James under Major General Benjamin Butler. It was commanded by Brigadier General Charles K. Graham and was not assigned to either of the two corps of the army.

During the war on terror in Iraq and Afghanistan, individual augmentees from the United States Navy served in the Army to make up for a shortfall of army personnel.

== See also ==
- Marines
- Pearl's Naval Brigade
- Australian Naval and Military Expeditionary Force, a combined army and naval infantry force established in the early days of World War I
