= BL 9.2-inch Mk VIII naval gun =

Ordnance BL 9.2-inch Mk VIII gun
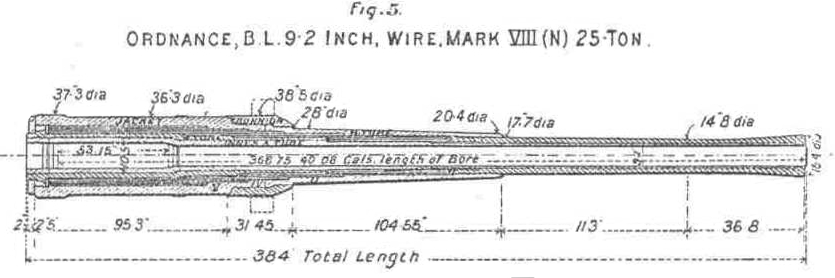
- Type: Naval gun
- Place of origin: United Kingdom

Service history
- In service: 1897–1918
- Used by: Royal Navy

Production history
- No. built: 6

Specifications
- Mass: 25 tons barrel & breech
- Barrel length: 368.7 inches (9,360 mm) (40.08 calibres)
- Shell: 380 pounds (170 kg)
- Calibre: 9.2-inch (233.7 mm)
- Muzzle velocity: 2,347 feet per second (715 m/s)
- Maximum firing range: 12,400 yards (11,300 m)

The BL 9.2-inch Mk VIII naval gun was designed for the new cordite propellants and was the first British wire-wound gun of this calibre.

== Naval service ==
The guns were mounted on the Powerful-class cruisers from 1897 until their decommissioning. After they were decommissioned some of the guns were used in coast defence in the UK, and from 1916 on one was mounted on the monitor HMS Marshal Ney.

== See also ==
- List of naval guns
