= Top Hat 25 =

English designed yachts

Top Hat 25 is a series of English designed yachts made in Australia from 1964 to 1986. It came in four different 'marks' (models) named Mk 0 - III. After the Mk III, another model, the Top Hat 27, was launched in 1986.

== MK 0 ==
The cold moulded model from 1963, four 3 mm laminations laid up with resorcinol glue on mahogany stem and main frame with laminated mahogany floors.

== MK I ==
Baker built MK 1's. Geoff Baker owned Fibreglass Yachts in NSW. These MK1's were built from around 1965-71 and had a hand laid up Glass-reinforced plastic hull and are considered to be a little stronger than the latter models. From late 1965 TopHats were laid up using a chopper gun (glass only) and by 1968 a Robinson (Robo) chopper/resin gun was used (one of the first in Australia). The hull was formed in two halves and on completion, the two side moulds were bolted together and chopped strand mat(CSM) and resin applied to join the halves together. Whilst still in the mould the plywood bulkheads and stringers were fitted and laminated in place. Later a chopper gun was used to apply most of the joining laminate and stringer placement. The keel was made from hand laid lead ingots with lead shot and resin used to form a homogeneous mass. This was topped with fibreglass and an epoxy coating was applied with the top forming the cabin sole and the space used between the two as a water tank. The hull was then removed from the mould and the fibreglass deck was then fitted and glassed in place using CSM. Fitout would then continue to the owner's specifications. Engines could be either fitted internally with a folding propeller or later in the decade a hole could be cut in the cockpit floor and hull and a laminated square tube allowed an outboard to be fitted. The MK1's did not have a sliding hatch above the companionway as did the timber models but had a "key-hole" entry (semi-elliptical shaped cabin top above companionway). Above sat the mainsheet traveller, which was a raised stainless steel tube following the contour of the cabin while some were later fitted with a conventional horizontal traveller. The cabin profile had a step down to the mast the main sheet winches mounted on steel struts. For accommodation, the original standard timber boat had four berths, a centrally located galley and a large chart table as Illingworth placed great importance on the role of the navigator, whilst with many of the MK1's the interior layout was often left up to the individual. However, most were built with an enclosed head, vee-berths forward, central galley and settee berths port and starboard. Formit Fibreglass brought the moulds from Fibreglass Yachts and produce six MK1's in 1972.

== MK II ==
Mike Garrett of Formit asked a Sydney Naval architect to improve the cabin layout and look at the boats sailing lines. The cabin layout was modernised but the Naval architect couldn't improve Illingworths original underwater lines. The new MK2 was released in November 1972 and had a relocated forward hatch, anchor well, wider and fatter cabin top and streamlining. A lock-up toilet was still available but an MK2 A appeared with a toilet forward and an oilskin locker!

== MK III ==
The MK3 appeared in 1976 and was usually characterised by a single sleek tinted acrylic glass window on either side of the cabin. However the traditional windows of three per side was still available and could be specified if required. Two interior designs were available. The A is the racing version with the head between the forward bunks and a hanging locker in the main saloon for wet weather gear etc. The B is a full lock-up toilet version with a smallish but manageable compartment with toilet, hand basin etc., aimed at the small family cruising market. A single deep cockpit locker was provided on the port side which allowed for a good sized quarter berth on the starboard side.

The basic hull remained the same with the near full length keel and a keel hung rudder. Ballast of 1234 kg (2721 lb), which was 321 lbs more than the Mark 1's, of lead or steel shot in the keel and a displacement of 2580 kg (5688 lb), makes a safe ballast ratio of 48%. The hulls were gun sprayed in two halves, joined down the middle and then steel shot ballast was cemented into the keel.

== Top Hat 27 ==
The Top Hat 27 was created to be used in the charter industry. The Top Hat 27 model is in fact an extended the Top Hat. There were 4 built before production ceased. After this Formit was taken over by other interests and started to re-focus their business to other markets . Unfortunately there are no official specifications of the boat.

== Top Hat 30's. ==
Formit sold a few yachts they called the Top Hat 30 and 32, but they were from another design and the only connection is the name. These so-called Top Hats are not considered to be Top Hats.
