= Meux, Charente-Maritime =

Meux
- Commune
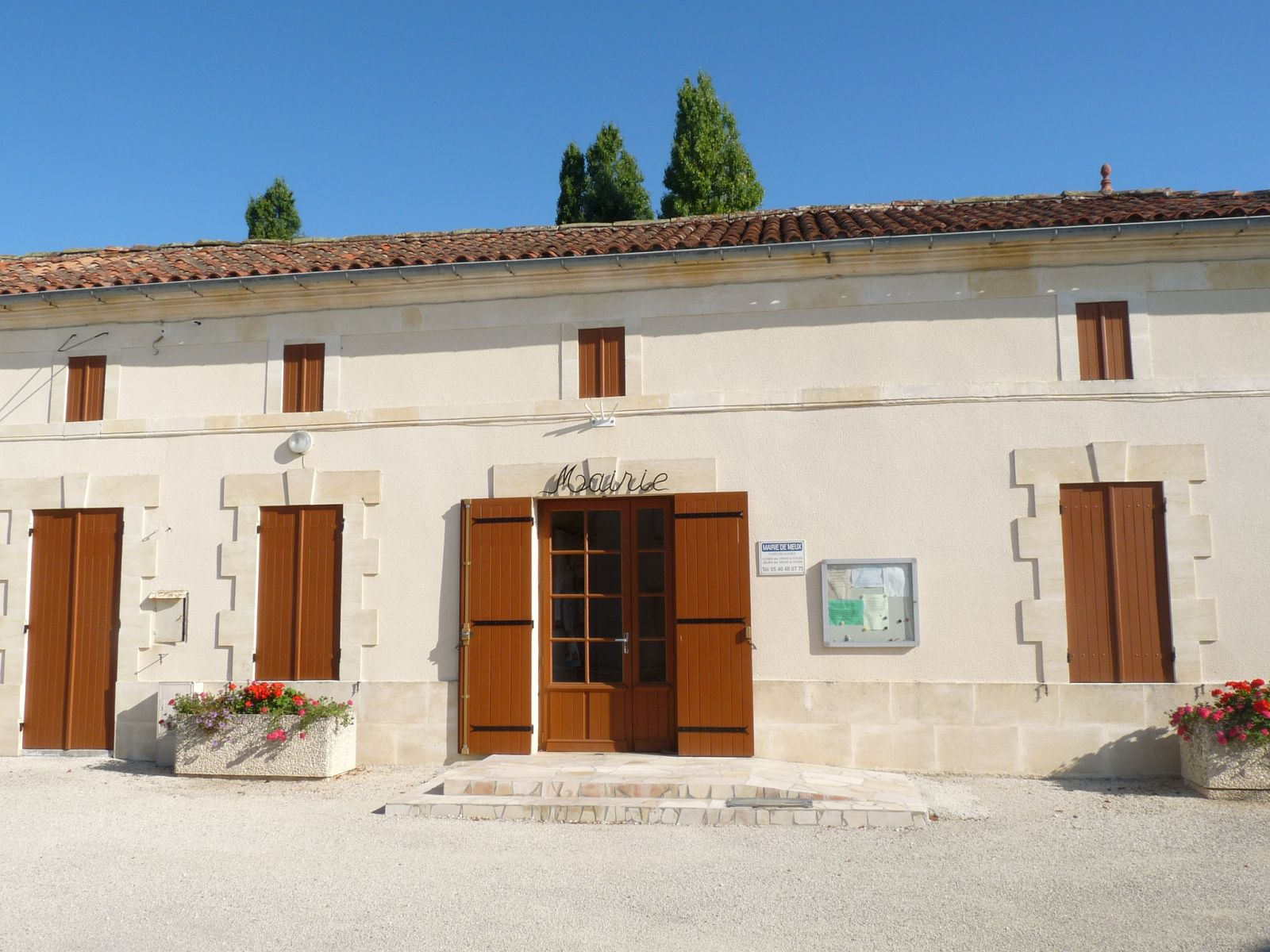
- The town hall in Meux
- Location of Meux
- Location within France Location within Nouvelle-Aquitaine
- Coordinates: 45°26′30″N 0°20′52″W
- Country: France
- Region: Nouvelle-Aquitaine
- Department: Charente-Maritime
- Arrondissement: Jonzac
- Canton: Jonzac

Government
  - Mayor (2021–2026): Chantal Duret
- Area^{1}: 8.23 km^{2} (3.18 sq mi)
- Highest elevation: 102 m (335 ft)
- Lowest elevation: 38 m (125 ft)
- Population (2023): 327
  - Density: 39.7/km^{2} (103/sq mi)
- Time zone: UTC+01:00 (CET)
  - Summer (DST): UTC+02:00 (CEST)
- INSEE/Postal code: 17233 /17500
- ^{1} French Land Register data, which excludes lakes, ponds, glaciers > 1 km^{2} (0.386 sq mi or 247 acres) and river estuaries.

Meux (French pronunciation: [mø]) is a commune in the Charente-Maritime department in the Nouvelle-Aquitaine region in southwestern France.

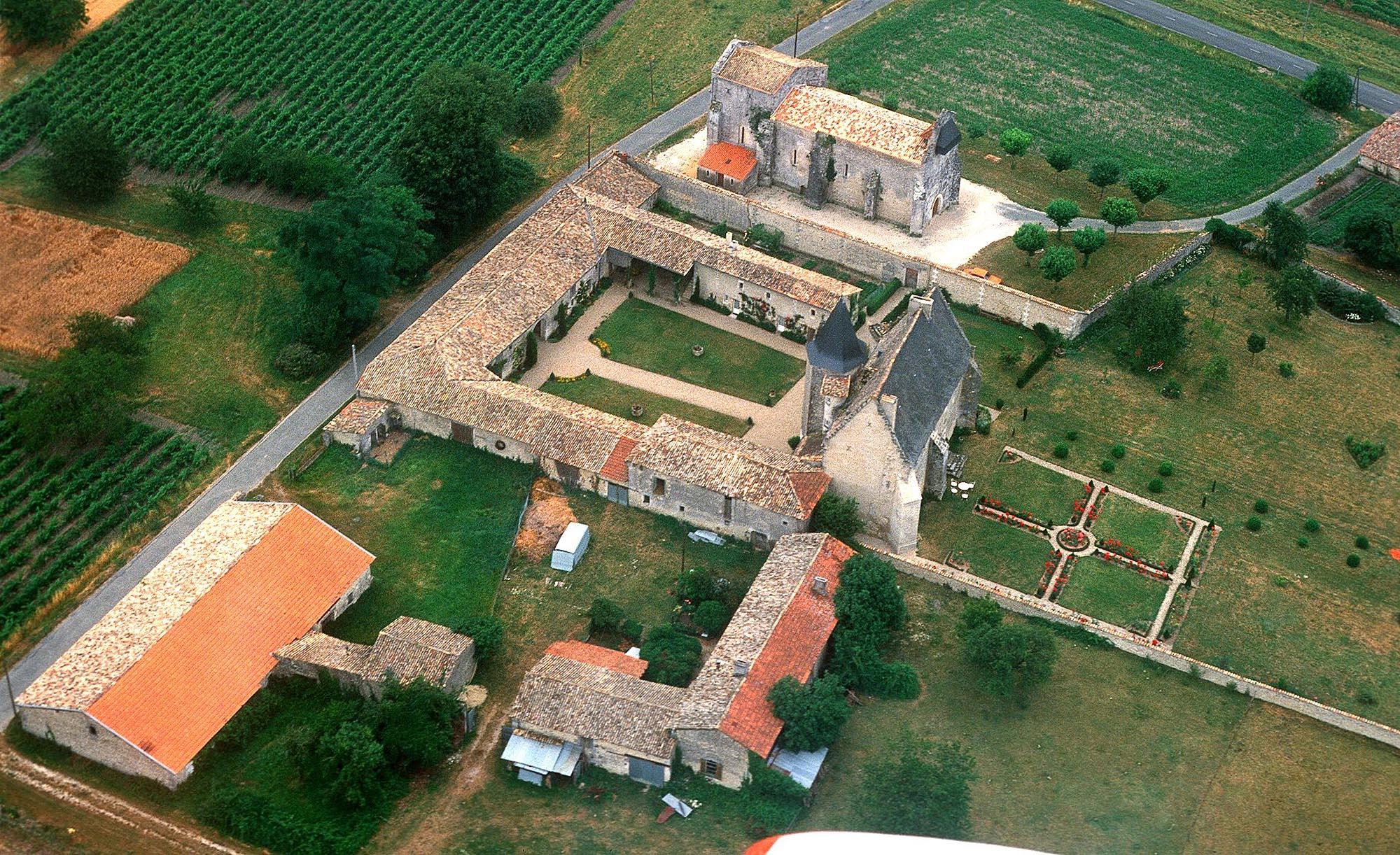
Church and castle of Meux

== Population ==
Historical population
Year	Pop.	±% p.a.
1968	264	—
1975	255	−0.49%
1982	274	+1.03%
1990	310	+1.56%
1999	307	−0.11%
2007	293	−0.58%
2012	293	+0.00%
2017	316	+1.52%
2023	327	+0.57%
Source: INSEE

== See also ==
- Communes of the Charente-Maritime department
