= Kalateh-ye Shir-e Pain =

Village in South Khorasan province, Iran

Kalateh-ye Shir-e Pain Persian: كلاته شيرپائين
- Village
- Location within Iran
- Coordinates: 32°19′22″N 60°34′42″E
- Country: Iran
- Province: South Khorasan
- County: Sarbisheh
- District: Doreh
- Rural District: Lanu

Population (2016)
  - Total: 112
- Time zone: UTC+3:30 (IRST)

Kalateh-ye Shir-e Pain (Persian: كلاته شيرپائين) (Note: Also romanized as Kalāteh-ye Shīr-e Pā’īn) is a village in Lanu Rural District of Doreh District in Sarbisheh County, South Khorasan province, Iran.

== Demographics ==
=== Population ===
At the time of the 2006 National Census, the village's population was 90 in 26 households, when it was in Doreh Rural District of the Central District. The following census in 2011 counted 85 people in 26 households. The 2016 census measured the population of the village as 112 people in 35 households, by which time the rural district had been separated from the district in the formation of Doreh District. Kalateh-ye Shir-e Pain was transferred to Lanu Rural District created in the new district.
