= Kalateh-ye Dahan Do Tagi =

Village in South Khorasan province, Iran

Kalateh-ye Dahan Do Tagi Persian: كلاته دهن دوتگي
- Village
- Country: Iran
- Province: South Khorasan
- County: Sarbisheh
- District: Doreh
- Rural District: Lanu

Population (2016)
  - Total: 30
- Time zone: UTC+3:30 (IRST)

Kalateh-ye Dahan Do Tagi (Persian: كلاته دهن دوتگي) (Note: Also romanized as Kalāteh-ye Dahan Do Tagī; also known as Kalāteh-ye Ḩamzeh (كلاته حمزه)) is a village in Lanu Rural District of Doreh District in Sarbisheh County, South Khorasan province, Iran.

== Demographics ==
=== Population ===
At the time of the 2006 National Census, the village's population was 45 in 11 households, when it was in Doreh Rural District of the Central District. The following census in 2011 counted 21 people in seven households. The 2016 census measured the population of the village as 30 people in 10 households, by which time the rural district had been separated from the district in the formation of Doreh District. Kalateh-ye Dahan Do Tagi was transferred to Lanu Rural District created in the new district.
