= Shabu, Iran =

Village in South Khorasan province, Iran

Shabu Persian: شبو
- Village
- Location within Iran
- Coordinates: 32°20′48″N 60°41′28″E
- Country: Iran
- Province: South Khorasan
- County: Sarbisheh
- District: Doreh
- Rural District: Lanu

Population (2016)
  - Total: 39
- Time zone: UTC+3:30 (IRST)

Shabu (Persian: شبو) (Note: Also romanized as Shabū; also known as Kalāt-e Shab, Kalateh Shab, and Kalāteh-ye Shab) is a village in Lanu Rural District of Doreh District in Sarbisheh County, South Khorasan province, Iran.

== Demographics ==
=== Population ===
At the time of the 2006 National Census, the village's population was 90 in 19 households, when it was in Doreh Rural District of the Central District. The following census in 2011 counted 44 people in nine households. The 2016 census measured the population of the village as 39 people in 13 households, by which time the rural district had been separated from the district in the formation of Doreh District. Shabu was transferred to Lanu Rural District created in the new district.
