= Khvoshab, South Khorasan =

Village in South Khorasan province, Iran

Khvoshab Persian: خوشاب
- Village
- Location within Iran
- Coordinates: 32°37′04″N 60°29′22″E
- Country: Iran
- Province: South Khorasan
- County: Sarbisheh
- District: Doreh
- Rural District: Lanu

Population (2016)
  - Total: 309
- Time zone: UTC+3:30 (IRST)

Khvoshab (Persian: خوشاب) (Note: Also romanized as Khooshab, Khush Āb, Khūshāb, and Khvoshāb) is a village in Lanu Rural District of Doreh District in Sarbisheh County, South Khorasan province, Iran.

== Demographics ==
=== Population ===
At the time of the 2006 National Census, the village's population was 206 in 46 households, when it was in Doreh Rural District of the Central District. The following census in 2011 counted 183 people in 51 households. The 2016 census measured the population of the village as 309 people in 87 households, by which time the rural district had been separated from the district in the formation of Doreh District. Khvoshab was transferred to Lanu Rural District created in the new district.
