= Kalateh-ye Shab =

Village in South Khorasan province, Iran

Kalateh-ye Shab Persian: كلاته شب
- Village
- Location within Iran
- Coordinates: 32°20′59″N 60°33′23″E
- Country: Iran
- Province: South Khorasan
- County: Sarbisheh
- District: Doreh
- Rural District: Lanu

Population (2016)
  - Total: 218
- Time zone: UTC+3:30 (IRST)

Kalateh-ye Shab (Persian: كلاته شب) (Note: Also romanized as Kalāteh-ye Shab) is a village in Lanu Rural District of Doreh District in Sarbisheh County, South Khorasan province, Iran.

== Demographics ==
=== Population ===
At the time of the 2006 National Census, the village's population was 230 in 76 households, when it was in Doreh Rural District of the Central District. The following census in 2011 counted 239 people in 70 households. The 2016 census measured the population of the village as 218 people in 67 households, by which time the rural district had been separated from the district in the formation of Doreh District. Kalateh-ye Shab was transferred to Lanu Rural District created in the new district.
