= Tajeshk =

Village in South Khorasan province, Iran

Tajeshk Persian: تجشك
- Village
- Location within Iran
- Coordinates: 32°28′58″N 60°30′18″E
- Country: Iran
- Province: South Khorasan
- County: Sarbisheh
- District: Doreh
- Rural District: Lanu

Population (2016)
  - Total: 284
- Time zone: UTC+3:30 (IRST)

Tajeshk (Persian: تجشك) (Note: Also known as Tajeshg) is a village in Lanu Rural District of Doreh District in Sarbisheh County, South Khorasan province, Iran.

== Demographics ==
=== Population ===
At the time of the 2006 National Census, the village's population was 270 in 68 households, when it was in Doreh Rural District of the Central District. The following census in 2011 counted 247 people in 67 households. The 2016 census measured the population of the village as 284 people in 85 households, by which time the rural district had been separated from the district in the formation of Doreh District. Tajeshk was transferred to Lanu Rural District created in the new district.
