= Mashuki =

Village in South Khorasan province, Iran

Mashuki Persian: مشوكي
- Village
- Location within Iran
- Coordinates: 32°34′47″N 60°29′59″E
- Country: Iran
- Province: South Khorasan
- County: Sarbisheh
- District: Doreh
- Rural District: Lanu

Population (2016)
  - Total: 325
- Time zone: UTC+3:30 (IRST)

Mashuki (Persian: مشوكي) (Note: Also romanized as Mashooki and Mashūkī) is a village in Lanu Rural District of Doreh District in Sarbisheh County, South Khorasan province, Iran.

== Demographics ==
=== Population ===
At the time of the 2006 National Census, the village's population was 320 in 87 households, when it was in Doreh Rural District of the Central District. The following census in 2011 counted 269 people in 77 households. The 2016 census measured the population of the village as 325 people in 91 households, by which time the rural district had been separated from the district in the formation of Doreh District. Mashuki was transferred to Lanu Rural District created in the new district.
