= Dahan-e Tangal =

Village in South Khorasan province, Iran

Dahan-e Tangal Persian: دهن تنگل
- Village
- Location within Iran
- Coordinates: 32°30′48″N 60°31′05″E
- Country: Iran
- Province: South Khorasan
- County: Sarbisheh
- District: Doreh
- Rural District: Lanu

Population (2016)
  - Total: 0
- Time zone: UTC+3:30 (IRST)

Dahan-e Tangal (Persian: دهن تنگل) (Note: Also romanized as Dahan Tangal and Dahān-i-Tangal; also known as Dahaneh-ye Tangal) is a village in Lanu Rural District of Doreh District in Sarbisheh County, South Khorasan province, Iran.

== Demographics ==
=== Population ===
At the time of the 2006 National Census, the village's population was 14 in four households, when it was in Doreh Rural District of the Central District. The village did not appear in the following census of 2011. The 2016 census measured the population of the village as zero, by which time the rural district had been separated from the district in the formation of Doreh District. Dahan-e Tangal was transferred to Lanu Rural District created in the new district.
