= Gavi-ye Sofla =

Village in South Khorasan province, Iran

Gavi-ye Sofla Persian: گوي سفلي
- Village
- Location within Iran
- Coordinates: 32°24′15″N 60°31′26″E
- Country: Iran
- Province: South Khorasan
- County: Sarbisheh
- District: Doreh
- Rural District: Lanu

Population (2016)
  - Total: 95
- Time zone: UTC+3:30 (IRST)

Gavi-ye Sofla (Persian: گوي سفلي) (Note: Also romanized as Gavī-ye Soflá; also known as Gavī) is a village in Lanu Rural District of Doreh District in Sarbisheh County, South Khorasan province, Iran.

== Demographics ==
=== Population ===
At the time of the 2006 National Census, the village's population was 135 in 42 households, when it was in Doreh Rural District of the Central District. The following census in 2011 counted 109 people in 33 households. The 2016 census measured the population of the village as 95 people in 32 households, by which time the rural district had been separated from the district in the formation of Doreh District. Gavi-ye Sofla was transferred to Lanu Rural District created in the new district.
