= Kalateh-ye Shir =

Village in South Khorasan province, Iran

Kalateh-ye Shir Persian: كلاته شير
- Village
- Location within Iran
- Coordinates: 32°19′46″N 60°34′39″E
- Country: Iran
- Province: South Khorasan
- County: Sarbisheh
- District: Doreh
- Rural District: Lanu

Population (2016)
  - Total: 129
- Time zone: UTC+3:30 (IRST)

Kalateh-ye Shir (Persian: كلاته شير) (Note: Also romanized as Kalāteh-ye Shīr; also known as Estakhr-e Derāz (استخردراز), Kalāt-e Shir, Kalāt-e Shīr, Kalāteh-ye Shīr, Shīr, and Shīr-e Bālā) is a village in Lanu Rural District of Doreh District in Sarbisheh County, South Khorasan province, Iran.

== Demographics ==
=== Population ===
At the time of the 2006 National Census, the village's population was 97 in 26 households, when it was in Doreh Rural District of the Central District. The following census in 2011 counted 92 people in 25 households. The 2016 census measured the population of the village as 129 people in 45 households, by which time the rural district had been separated from the district in the formation of Doreh District. Kalateh-ye Shir was transferred to Lanu Rural District created in the new district.
