= Tut, South Khorasan =

Village in South Khorasan province, Iran

Tut Persian: توت
- Village
- Location within Iran
- Coordinates: 32°27′42″N 60°32′46″E
- Country: Iran
- Province: South Khorasan
- County: Sarbisheh
- District: Doreh
- Rural District: Lanu

Population (2016)
  - Total: 96
- Time zone: UTC+3:30 (IRST)

Tut (Persian: توت) (Note: Also romanized as Tūt) is a village in Lanu Rural District of Doreh District in Sarbisheh County, South Khorasan province, Iran.

== Demographics ==
=== Population ===
At the time of the 2006 National Census, the village's population was 102 in 29 households, when it was in Doreh Rural District of the Central District. The following census in 2011 counted 79 people in 30 households. The 2016 census measured the population of the village as 96 people in 31 households, by which time the rural district had been separated from the district in the formation of Doreh District. Tut was transferred to Lanu Rural District created in the new district.
