= Bisheh, Sarbisheh =

Village in South Khorasan province, Iran

Bisheh Persian: بيشه
- Village
- Location within Iran
- Coordinates: 32°26′19″N 60°37′23″E
- Country: Iran
- Province: South Khorasan
- County: Sarbisheh
- District: Doreh
- Rural District: Lanu

Population (2016)
  - Total: 190
- Time zone: UTC+3:30 (IRST)

Bisheh (Persian: بيشه) (Note: Also romanized as Bīsheh) is a village in Lanu Rural District of Doreh District in Sarbisheh County, South Khorasan province, Iran.

== Demographics ==
=== Population ===
At the time of the 2006 National Census, the village's population was 225 in 49 households, when it was in Doreh Rural District of the Central District. The following census in 2011 counted 189 people in 43 households. The 2016 census measured the population of the village as 190 people in 53 households, by which time the rural district had been separated from the district in the formation of Doreh District. Bisheh was transferred to Lanu Rural District created in the new district.
