= Darbelund =

Village in South Khorasan province, Iran

Darbelund Persian: دربلوند
- Village
- Location within Iran
- Coordinates: 32°27′52″N 60°33′22″E
- Country: Iran
- Province: South Khorasan
- County: Sarbisheh
- District: Doreh
- Rural District: Lanu

Population (2016)
  - Total: 195
- Time zone: UTC+3:30 (IRST)

Darbelund (Persian: دربلوند) (Note: Also romanized as Darbelūnd; also known as Darb-e Lūn) is a village in Lanu Rural District of Doreh District in Sarbisheh County, South Khorasan province, Iran.

== Demographics ==
=== Population ===
At the time of the 2006 National Census, the village's population was 153 in 44 households, when it was in Doreh Rural District of the Central District. The following census in 2011 counted 145 people in 43 households. The 2016 census measured the population of the village as 195 people in 59 households, by which time the rural district had been separated from the district in the formation of Doreh District. Darbelund was transferred to Lanu Rural District created in the new district.
