= Abbasabad, Lanu =

Village in South Khorasan province, Iran

Abbasabad Persian: عباس اباد
- Village
- Location within Iran
- Coordinates: 32°30′06″N 60°30′55″E
- Country: Iran
- Province: South Khorasan
- County: Sarbisheh
- District: Doreh
- Rural District: Lanu

Population (2016)
  - Total: 53
- Time zone: UTC+3:30 (IRST)

Abbasabad (Persian: عباس اباد) (Note: Also romanized as ‘Abbāsābād; also known as Qaleh Abbāsābād) is a village in Lanu Rural District of Doreh District in Sarbisheh County, South Khorasan province, Iran.

== Demographics ==
=== Population ===
At the time of the 2006 National Census, the village's population was 66 in 20 households, when it was in Doreh Rural District of the Central District. The following census in 2011 counted 56 people in 21 households. The 2016 census measured the population of the village as 53 people in 18 households, by which time the rural district had been separated from the district in the formation of Doreh District. Abbasabad was transferred to Lanu Rural District created in the new district.
