= Kalateh-ye Masib =

Village in South Khorasan province, Iran

Kalateh-ye Masib Persian: كلاته مصيب
- Village
- Country: Iran
- Province: South Khorasan
- County: Sarbisheh
- District: Doreh
- Rural District: Lanu

Population (2016)
  - Total: 55
- Time zone: UTC+3:30 (IRST)

Kalateh-ye Masib (Persian: كلاته مصيب) (Note: Also romanized as Kalāteh-ye Maṣīb) is a village in Lanu Rural District of Doreh District in Sarbisheh County, South Khorasan province, Iran.

== Demographics ==
=== Population ===
At the time of the 2006 National Census, the village's population was 34 in 10 households, when it was in Doreh Rural District of the Central District. The following census in 2011 counted 34 people in 11 households. The 2016 census measured the population of the village as 55 people in 17 households, by which time the rural district had been separated from the district in the formation of Doreh District. Kalateh-ye Masib was transferred to Lanu Rural District created in the new district.
