= Puzeh-ye Zard =

Village in South Khorasan province, Iran

Puzeh-ye Zard Persian: پوزه زرد
- Village
- Country: Iran
- Province: South Khorasan
- County: Sarbisheh
- District: Doreh
- Rural District: Lanu

Population (2016)
  - Total: 34
- Time zone: UTC+3:30 (IRST)

Puzeh-ye Zard (Persian: پوزه زرد) (Note: Also romanized as Pūzeh-ye Zard) is a village in Lanu Rural District of Doreh District in Sarbisheh County, South Khorasan province, Iran.

== Demographics ==
=== Population ===
At the time of the 2006 National Census, the village's population was 27 in eight households, when it was in Doreh Rural District of the Central District. The following census in 2011 counted 34 people in nine households. The 2016 census measured the population of the village as 34 people in 10 households, by which time the rural district had been separated from the district in the formation of Doreh District. Puzeh-ye Zard was transferred to Lanu Rural District created in the new district.
