= Ozbak, South Khorasan =

Village in South Khorasan province, Iran

Ozbak Persian: ازبك
- Village
- Location within Iran
- Coordinates: 32°27′19″N 60°33′59″E
- Country: Iran
- Province: South Khorasan
- County: Sarbisheh
- District: Doreh
- Rural District: Lanu

Population (2016)
  - Total: 98
- Time zone: UTC+3:30 (IRST)

Ozbak (Persian: ازبك) is a village in Lanu Rural District of Doreh District in Sarbisheh County, South Khorasan province, Iran.

== Demographics ==
=== Population ===
At the time of the 2006 National Census, the village's population was 108 in 28 households, when it was in Doreh Rural District of the Central District. The following census in 2011 counted 96 people in 27 households. The 2016 census measured the population of the village as 98 people in 28 households, by which time the rural district had been separated from the district in the formation of Doreh District. Ozbak was transferred to Lanu Rural District created in the new district.
