= Shurkeh =

Village in South Khorasan province, Iran

Shurkeh Persian: شوركه
- Village
- Location within Iran
- Coordinates: 32°31′34″N 60°30′03″E
- Country: Iran
- Province: South Khorasan
- County: Sarbisheh
- District: Doreh
- Rural District: Lanu

Population (2016)
  - Total: 124
- Time zone: UTC+3:30 (IRST)

Shurkeh (Persian: شوركه) (Note: Also romanized as Shūrkeh; also known as Shūr-e Bālā and Shūrkeh-ye Bālā) is a village in Lanu Rural District of Doreh District in Sarbisheh County, South Khorasan province, Iran.

== Demographics ==
=== Population ===
At the time of the 2006 National Census, the village's population was 124 in 32 households, when it was in Doreh Rural District of the Central District. The following census in 2011 counted 100 people in 28 households. The 2016 census measured the population of the village as 124 people in 37 households, by which time the rural district had been separated from the district in the formation of Doreh District. Shurkeh was transferred to Lanu Rural District created in the new district.
