= Galu Bagh =

Village in South Khorasan province, Iran

Galu Bagh Persian: گلوباغ
- Village
- Location within Iran
- Coordinates: 32°24′04″N 60°36′20″E
- Country: Iran
- Province: South Khorasan
- County: Sarbisheh
- District: Doreh
- Rural District: Lanu

Population (2016)
  - Total: 390
- Time zone: UTC+3:30 (IRST)

Galu Bagh (Persian: گلوباغ) (Note: Also romanized as Galoo Bagh and Galū Bāgh; also known as Gūleh Bāghak and Gulu-i-Bāghak) is a village in Lanu Rural District of Doreh District in Sarbisheh County, South Khorasan province, Iran.

== Demographics ==
=== Population ===
At the time of the 2006 National Census, the village's population was 392 in 107 households, when it was in Doreh Rural District of the Central District. The following census in 2011 counted 345 people in 99 households. The 2016 census measured the population of the village as 390 people in 118 households, by which time the rural district had been separated from the district in the formation of Doreh District. Galu Bagh was transferred to Lanu Rural District created in the new district.
