= Bagh-e Khvajeh =

Village in South Khorasan province, Iran

Bagh-e Khvajeh Persian: باغ خواجه
- Village
- Location within Iran
- Coordinates: 32°20′00″N 60°34′21″E
- Country: Iran
- Province: South Khorasan
- County: Sarbisheh
- District: Doreh
- Rural District: Lanu

Population (2016)
  - Total: 89
- Time zone: UTC+3:30 (IRST)

Bagh-e Khvajeh (Persian: باغ خواجه) (Note: Also romanized as Bāgh-e Khvājeh; also known as Deh Khvājeh, Kalāt-e Bāgh-e Khvājeh, Khvājeh, and Khwāja) is a village in Lanu Rural District of Doreh District in Sarbisheh County, South Khorasan province, Iran.

== Demographics ==
=== Population ===
At the time of the 2006 National Census, the village's population was 87 in 26 households, when it was in Doreh Rural District of the Central District. The following census in 2011 counted 86 people in 28 households. The 2016 census measured the population of the village as 89 people in 26 households, by which time the rural district had been separated from the district in the formation of Doreh District. Bagh-e Khvajeh was transferred to Lanu Rural District created in the new district.
