= Rahimabad-e Lanu =

Village in South Khorasan province, Iran

Rahimabad-e Lanu Persian: رحيم ابادلانو
- Village
- Location within Iran
- Country: Iran
- Province: South Khorasan
- County: Sarbisheh
- District: Doreh
- Rural District: Lanu

Population (2016)
  - Total: 56
- Time zone: UTC+3:30 (IRST)

Rahimabad-e Lanu (Persian: رحيم ابادلانو) (Note: Also romanized as Raḩīmābād-e Lānū; also known as Raḩīmābād) is a village in Lanu Rural District of Doreh District in Sarbisheh County, South Khorasan province, Iran.

== Demographics ==
=== Population ===
At the time of the 2006 National Census, the village's population was 42 in 12 households, when it was in Doreh Rural District of the Central District. The following census in 2011 counted 47 people in 14 households. The 2016 census measured the population of the village as 56 people in 15 households, by which time the rural district had been separated from the district in the formation of Doreh District. Rahimabad-e Lanu was transferred to Lanu Rural District created in the new district.
