= Nowdeh-e Olya =

Village in South Khorasan province, Iran

Nowdeh-e Olya Persian: نوده عليا
- Village
- Location within Iran
- Coordinates: 32°32′07″N 60°29′38″E
- Country: Iran
- Province: South Khorasan
- County: Sarbisheh
- District: Doreh
- Rural District: Lanu

Population (2016)
  - Total: 147
- Time zone: UTC+3:30 (IRST)

Nowdeh-e Olya (Persian: نوده عليا) (Note: Also romanized as Nowdeh-e ‘Olyā; also known as Nowdeh-e Bālā) is a village in Lanu Rural District of Doreh District in Sarbisheh County, South Khorasan province, Iran.

== Demographics ==
=== Population ===
At the time of the 2006 National Census, the village's population was 119 in 34 households, when it was in Doreh Rural District of the Central District. The following census in 2011 counted 126 people in 37 households. The 2016 census measured the population of the village as 147 people in 43 households, by which time the rural district had been separated from the district in the formation of Doreh District. Nowdeh-e Olya was transferred to Lanu Rural District created in the new district.
