= Khakak =

Village in South Khorasan province, Iran

Khakak Persian: خاكك
- Village
- Country: Iran
- Province: South Khorasan
- County: Sarbisheh
- District: Doreh
- Rural District: Doreh

Population (2016)
  - Total: 96
- Time zone: UTC+3:30 (IRST)

Khakak (Persian: خاكك) (Note: Also romanized as Khāḵaḵ) is a village in Doreh Rural District of Doreh District in Sarbisheh County, South Khorasan province, Iran.

== Demographics ==
=== Population ===
At the time of the 2006 National Census, the village's population was 93 in 28 households, when it was in the Central District. The following census in 2011 counted 82 people in 25 households. The 2016 census measured the population of the village as 96 people in 31 households, by which time the rural district had been separated from the district in the formation of Doreh District.
