= Kafaz =

Village in South Khorasan province, Iran

Kafaz Persian: كفاز
- Village
- Location within Iran
- Coordinates: 32°32′56″N 60°22′13″E
- Country: Iran
- Province: South Khorasan
- County: Sarbisheh
- District: Doreh
- Rural District: Doreh

Population (2016)
  - Total: 266
- Time zone: UTC+3:30 (IRST)

Kafaz (Persian: كفاز) (Note: Also romanized as Kafāz; also known as Kafās and Kaffāz-e Soflá) is a village in Doreh Rural District of Doreh District in Sarbisheh County, South Khorasan province, Iran.

== Demographics ==
=== Population ===
At the time of the 2006 National Census, the village's population was 235 in 49 households, when it was in the Central District. The following census in 2011 counted 241 people in 58 households. The 2016 census measured the population of the village as 266 people in 69 households, by which time the rural district had been separated from the district in the formation of Doreh District.
