= Markeh =

Village in South Khorasan province, Iran

Markeh Persian: مركه
- Village
- Location within Iran
- Coordinates: 32°29′20″N 60°30′25″E
- Country: Iran
- Province: South Khorasan
- County: Sarbisheh
- District: Doreh
- Rural District: Lanu

Population (2016)
  - Total: 111
- Time zone: UTC+3:30 (IRST)

Markeh (Persian: مركه) (Note: Also known as Mārkā and Mūkeh (موكه)) is a village in Lanu Rural District of Doreh District in Sarbisheh County, South Khorasan province, Iran.

== Demographics ==
=== Population ===
At the time of the 2006 National Census, the village's population was 154 in 42 households, when it was in Doreh Rural District of the Central District. The following census in 2011 counted 129 people in 40 households. The 2016 census measured the population of the village as 111 people in 35 households, by which time the rural district had been separated from the district in the formation of Doreh District. Markeh was transferred to Lanu Rural District created in the new district.
