= Kal-e Sorkh, South Khorasan =

Village in South Khorasan province, Iran

Kal-e Sorkh Persian: كال سرخ
- Village
- Location within Iran
- Coordinates: 32°13′46″N 60°04′31″E
- Country: Iran
- Province: South Khorasan
- County: Sarbisheh
- District: Central
- Rural District: Gheynab

Population (2016)
  - Total: 47
- Time zone: UTC+3:30 (IRST)

Kal-e Sorkh (Persian: كال سرخ) (Note: Also romanized as Kāl-e Sorkh) is a village in Gheynab Rural District of the Central District in Sarbisheh County, South Khorasan province, Iran.

== Demographics ==
At the time of the 2006 National Census, the village's population was 102 in 22 households, when it was in Momenabad Rural District. The following census in 2011 counted 56 people in 13 households. The 2016 census measured the population of the village as 47 people in 12 households, by which time it had been separated from the rural district in the formation of Gheynab Rural District.
