= Abbasabad, Gheynab =

Village in South Khorasan province, Iran

Abbasabad Persian: عباس اباد
- Village
- Location within Iran
- Coordinates: 32.618827°N 60.063449°E
- Country: Iran
- Province: South Khorasan
- County: Sarbisheh
- District: Central
- Rural District: Gheynab

Population (2016)
  - Total: 54
- Time zone: UTC+3:30 (IRST)

Abbasabad (Persian: عباس اباد) (Note: Also romanized as ‘Abbāsābād) is a village in Gheynab Rural District of the Central District in Sarbisheh County, South Khorasan province, Iran.

== Demographics ==
At the time of the 2006 National Census, the village's population was 65 in 15 households, when it was in Momenabad Rural District. The following census in 2011 counted 82 people in 25 households. The 2016 census measured the population of the village as 54 people in 14 households, by which time it had been separated from the rural district in the formation of Gheynab Rural District.
