= Gondakan =

Village in South Khorasan province, Iran

Gondakan Persian: گندكان
- Village
- Location within Iran
- Coordinates: 32°34′18″N 59°58′03″E
- Country: Iran
- Province: South Khorasan
- County: Sarbisheh
- District: Central
- Rural District: Gheynab

Population (2016)
  - Total: 28
- Time zone: UTC+3:30 (IRST)

Gondakan (Persian: گندكان) (Note: Also romanized as Gandakan, Gandkān, and Gondakān; also known as Gondehkān and Gūndakan) is a village in Gheynab Rural District of the Central District in Sarbisheh County, South Khorasan province, Iran.

== Demographics ==
At the time of the 2006 National Census, the village's population was 24 in eight households, when it was in Momenabad Rural District. The following census in 2011 counted 36 people in nine households. The 2016 census measured the population of the village as 28 people in five households, by which time it had been separated from the rural district in the formation of Gheynab Rural District.
