= Tighanab-e Bala =

Village in South Khorasan province, Iran

Tighanab-e Bala Persian: تيغناب بالا
- Village
- Location within Iran
- Coordinates: 32°08′44″N 60°34′32″E
- Country: Iran
- Province: South Khorasan
- County: Sarbisheh
- District: Doreh
- Rural District: Doreh

Population (2016)
  - Total: 72
- Time zone: UTC+3:30 (IRST)

Tighanab-e Bala (Persian: تيغناب بالا) (Note: Also romanized as Tīghanab Bālā and Tīghanab-e Bālā) is a village in Doreh Rural District of Doreh District in Sarbisheh County, South Khorasan province, Iran.

== Demographics ==
=== Population ===
At the time of the 2006 National Census, the village's population was 34 in seven households, when it was in the Central District. The following census in 2011 counted 33 people in six households. The 2016 census measured the population of the village as 72 people in 15 households, by which time the rural district had been separated from the district in the formation of Doreh District.
