= Saffal Band =

Village in South Khorasan province, Iran

Saffal Band Persian: سفال بند
- Village
- Location within Iran
- Coordinates: 32°30′02″N 60°22′43″E
- Country: Iran
- Province: South Khorasan
- County: Sarbisheh
- District: Doreh
- Rural District: Doreh

Population (2016)
  - Total: 186
- Time zone: UTC+3:30 (IRST)

Saffal Band (Persian: سفال بند) (Note: Also romanized as Safāl Band and Saffāl Band) is a village in Doreh Rural District of Doreh District in Sarbisheh County, South Khorasan province, Iran.

== Demographics ==
=== Population ===
At the time of the 2006 National Census, the village's population was 196 in 48 households, when it was in the Central District. The following census in 2011 counted 220 people in 53 households. The 2016 census measured the population of the village as 186 people in 41 households, by which time the rural district had been separated from the district in the formation of Doreh District.
