= Kalateh-ye Chajiha =

Kalateh-ye Chajiha كلاته چاجيها
- Village
- Country: Iran
- Province: South Khorasan
- County: Sarbisheh
- Bakhsh: Central
- Rural District: Momenabad

Population (2006)
  - Total: 13
- Time zone: UTC+3:30 (IRST)
  - Summer (DST): UTC+4:30 (IRDT)

Kalateh-ye Chajiha (Persian: كلاته چاجيها, also Romanized as Kalāteh-ye Chājīhā) is a village in Momenabad Rural District, in the Central District of Sarbisheh County, South Khorasan Province, Iran. At the 2006 census, its population was 13, in 4 families.
