= Darakht-e Tut, South Khorasan =

Village in South Khorasan province, Iran

Darakht-e Tut Persian: درخت توت
- Village
- Location within Iran
- Coordinates: 32°33′09″N 60°30′03″E
- Country: Iran
- Province: South Khorasan
- County: Sarbisheh
- District: Doreh
- Rural District: Lanu

Population (2016)
  - Total: 219
- Time zone: UTC+3:30 (IRST)

Darakht-e Tut (Persian: درخت توت) (Note: Also romanized as Darakht-e Tūt; and also known as Nasīmābād) is a village in Lanu Rural District of Doreh District in Sarbisheh County, South Khorasan province, Iran.

== Demographics ==
=== Population ===
At the time of the 2006 National Census, the village's population was 243 in 66 households, when it was in Doreh Rural District of the Central District. The following census in 2011 counted 174 people in 61 households. The 2016 census measured the population of the village as 219 people in 71 households, by which time the rural district had been separated from the district in the formation of Doreh District. Darakht-e Tut was transferred to Lanu Rural District created in the new district.
