= Sulabast =

Village in South Khorasan province, Iran

Sulabast Persian: صولابست
- Village
- Location within Iran
- Coordinates: 32°32′16″N 60°18′57″E
- Country: Iran
- Province: South Khorasan
- County: Sarbisheh
- District: Doreh
- Rural District: Doreh

Population (2016)
  - Total: 152
- Time zone: UTC+3:30 (IRST)

Sulabast (Persian: صولابست) (Note: Also romanized as Soolabast and Sūlābast; also known as Sūlāvas and Sulāwās) is a village in Doreh Rural District of Doreh District in Sarbisheh County, South Khorasan province, Iran.

== Demographics ==
=== Population ===
At the time of the 2006 National Census, the village's population was 154 in 32 households, when it was in the Central District. The following census in 2011 counted 171 people in 37 households. The 2016 census measured the population of the village as 152 people in 38 households, by which time the rural district had been separated from the district in the formation of Doreh District.
