= Golab-e Pain =

Village in South Khorasan province, Iran

Golab-e Pain Persian: گلاب پايين
- Village
- Location within Iran
- Coordinates: 32°32′04″N 59°55′55″E
- Country: Iran
- Province: South Khorasan
- County: Sarbisheh
- District: Central
- Rural District: Gheynab

Population (2016)
  - Total: Below reporting threshold
- Time zone: UTC+3:30 (IRST)

Golab-e Pain (Persian: گلاب پايين) (Note: Also romanized as Golāb-e Pā’īn; also known as Golāb) is a village in Gheynab Rural District of the Central District in Sarbisheh County, South Khorasan province, Iran.

== Demographics ==
At the time of the 2006 National Census, the village's population was 11 in four households, when it was in Momenabad Rural District. The following censuses in 2011 and 2016 counted a population below the reporting threshold, by which time the village had been separated from the rural district in the formation of Gheynab Rural District.
