= Kalateh-ye Baluch, Sarbisheh =

Village in South Khorasan province, Iran

Kalateh-ye Baluch Persian: كلاته بلوچ
- Village
- Location within Iran
- Coordinates: 32°34′18″N 60°23′50″E
- Country: Iran
- Province: South Khorasan
- County: Sarbisheh
- District: Doreh
- Rural District: Doreh

Population (2016)
  - Total: 161
- Time zone: UTC+3:30 (IRST)

Kalateh-ye Baluch (Persian: كلاته بلوچ) (Note: Also romanized as Kalāteh Balūch, Kalāteh-ye Balūch, Kalateh-ye Boluch, and Kalāteh-ye Bolūch; also known as Kalāt-e Balūch) is a village in Doreh Rural District of Doreh District in Sarbisheh County, South Khorasan province, Iran.

== Demographics ==
=== Population ===
At the time of the 2006 National Census, the village's population was 127 in 24 households, when it was in the Central District. The following census in 2011 counted 142 people in 32 households. The 2016 census measured the population of the village as 161 people in 40 households, by which time the rural district had been separated from the district in the formation of Doreh District.
