= Eskivang =

Village in South Khorasan province, Iran

Eskivang Persian: اسكيونگ
- Village
- Location within Iran
- Coordinates: 32°41′12″N 59°58′04″E
- Country: Iran
- Province: South Khorasan
- County: Sarbisheh
- District: Central
- Rural District: Gheynab

Population (2016)
  - Total: 148
- Time zone: UTC+3:30 (IRST)

Eskivang (Persian: اسكيونگ) (Note: Also romanized as Eskioonag and Eskīvang; also known as Eskayūnak, Eskībang, Eskīūnak, Eskīvank, and Iskībang) is a village in Gheynab Rural District of the Central District in Sarbisheh County, South Khorasan province, Iran.

== Demographics ==
At the time of the 2006 National Census, the village's population was 356 in 92 households, when it was in Momenabad Rural District. The following census in 2011 counted 231 people in 68 households. The 2016 census measured the population of the village as 148 people in 45 households, by which time it had been separated from the rural district in the formation of Gheynab Rural District.
