= Damdameh =

Village in South Khorasan province, Iran

Damdameh Persian: دامدامه
- Village
- Location within Iran
- Coordinates: 32°29′36″N 60°20′07″E
- Country: Iran
- Province: South Khorasan
- County: Sarbisheh
- District: Doreh
- Rural District: Doreh

Population (2016)
  - Total: 94
- Time zone: UTC+3:30 (IRST)

Damdameh (Persian: دامدامه) (Note: Also romanized as Dāmdāmeh) is a village in Doreh Rural District of Doreh District in Sarbisheh County, South Khorasan province, Iran.

== Demographics ==
=== Population ===
At the time of the 2006 National Census, the village's population was 77 in 18 households, when it was in the Central District. The following census in 2011 counted 100 people in 24 households. The 2016 census measured the population of the village as 94 people in 22 households, by which time the rural district had been separated from the district in the formation of Doreh District.
