= Mohammadabad-e Kharkash =

Village in South Khorasan province, Iran

Mohammadabad-e Kharkash Persian: محمدابادخركش
- Village
- Location within Iran
- Country: Iran
- Province: South Khorasan
- County: Sarbisheh
- District: Central
- Rural District: Gheynab

Population (2016)
  - Total: 225
- Time zone: UTC+3:30 (IRST)

Mohammadabad-e Kharkash (Persian: محمدابادخركش) (Note: Also romanized as Moḩammadābād-e Kharkash; also known as Hemmatābād (همت اباد), Moḩammadābād, and Muhammadābād) is a village in Gheynab Rural District of the Central District in Sarbisheh County, South Khorasan province, Iran.

== Demographics ==
At the time of the 2006 National Census, the village's population was 187 in 56 households, when it was in Momenabad Rural District. The following census in 2011 counted 264 people in 70 households. The 2016 census measured the population of the village as 225 people in 64 households, by which time it had been separated from the rural district in the formation of Gheynab Rural District.
