= Chah Pensar =

Village in South Khorasan province, Iran

Chah Pensar Persian: چاه پنسر
- Village
- Location within Iran
- Coordinates: 32°26′29″N 60°16′44″E
- Country: Iran
- Province: South Khorasan
- County: Sarbisheh
- District: Doreh
- Rural District: Doreh

Population (2016)
  - Total: 331
- Time zone: UTC+3:30 (IRST)

Chah Pensar (Persian: چاه پنسر) (Note: Also romanized as Chāh Pensar) is a village in Doreh Rural District of Doreh District in Sarbisheh County, South Khorasan province, Iran.

== Demographics ==
=== Population ===
At the time of the 2006 National Census, the village's population was 262 in 54 households, when it was in the Central District. The following census in 2011 counted 318 people in 65 households. The 2016 census measured the population of the village as 331 people in 77 households, by which time the rural district had been separated from the district in the formation of Doreh District.
