= Kun Rud Siahu =

Village in South Khorasan province, Iran

Kun Rud Siahu Persian: كون رودسياهو
- Village
- Location within Iran
- Coordinates: 32°20′41″N 60°14′24″E
- Country: Iran
- Province: South Khorasan
- County: Sarbisheh
- District: Central
- Rural District: Gheynab

Population (2016)
  - Total: 248
- Time zone: UTC+3:30 (IRST)

Kun Rud Siahu (Persian: كون رودسياهو) (Note: Also romanized as Kūn Rūd Sīāhū) is a village in Gheynab Rural District of the Central District in Sarbisheh County, South Khorasan province, Iran.

== Demographics ==
At the time of the 2006 National Census, the village's population was 341 in 48 households, when it was in Momenabad Rural District. The following census in 2011 counted 271 people in 61 households. The 2016 census measured the population of the village as 248 people in 58 households, by which time it had been separated from the rural district in the formation of Gheynab Rural District.
