= Khar Miri =

Village in South Khorasan province, Iran

Khar Miri Persian: خرميري
- Village
- Location within Iran
- Coordinates: 32°38′26″N 60°03′44″E
- Country: Iran
- Province: South Khorasan
- County: Sarbisheh
- District: Central
- Rural District: Gheynab

Population (2016)
  - Total: 19
- Time zone: UTC+3:30 (IRST)

Khar Miri (Persian: خرميري) (Note: Also romanized as Khar Mīrī) is a village in Gheynab Rural District of the Central District in Sarbisheh County, South Khorasan province, Iran.

== Demographics ==
At the time of the 2006 National Census, the village's population was 24 in eight households, when it was in Momenabad Rural District. The following census in 2011 counted 22 people in six households. The 2016 census measured the population of the village as 19 people in five households, by which time it had been separated from the rural district in the formation of Gheynab Rural District.
