= Mish-e Now =

Village in South Khorasan province, Iran

Mish-e Now Persian: ميش نو
- Village
- Country: Iran
- Province: South Khorasan
- County: Sarbisheh
- District: Doreh
- Rural District: Doreh

Population (2016)
  - Total: 0
- Time zone: UTC+3:30 (IRST)

Mish-e Now (Persian: ميش نو) (Note: Also romanized as Mīsh-e Now) is a village in Doreh Rural District of Doreh District in Sarbisheh County, South Khorasan province, Iran.

== Demographics ==
=== Population ===
At the time of the 2006 National Census, the village's population was 51 in 10 households, when it was in the Central District. The village did not appear in the following census of 2011. The 2016 census measured the population of the village as zero, by which time the rural district had been separated from the district in the formation of Doreh District.
