= Kasrab =

Village in South Khorasan province, Iran

Kasrab Persian: كسراب
- Village
- Location within Iran
- Coordinates: 32°20′31″N 60°00′54″E
- Country: Iran
- Province: South Khorasan
- County: Sarbisheh
- District: Central
- Rural District: Gheynab

Population (2016)
  - Total: 296
- Time zone: UTC+3:30 (IRST)

Kasrab (Persian: كسراب) (Note: Also romanized as Kasrāb) is a village in Gheynab Rural District of the Central District in Sarbisheh County, South Khorasan province, Iran.

== Demographics ==
At the time of the 2006 National Census, the village's population was 324 in 63 households, when it was in Momenabad Rural District. The following census in 2011 counted 310 people in 76 households. The 2016 census measured the population of the village as 296 people in 73 households, by which time it had been separated from the rural district in the formation of Gheynab Rural District.
