= Ali Hedyeh-ye Olya =

Village in South Khorasan province, Iran

Ali Hedyeh-ye Olya Persian: علي هديه عليا
- Village
- Location within Iran
- Coordinates: 32°21′51″N 60°37′15″E
- Country: Iran
- Province: South Khorasan
- County: Sarbisheh
- District: Doreh
- Rural District: Lanu

Population (2016)
  - Total: 201
- Time zone: UTC+3:30 (IRST)

Ali Hedyeh-ye Olya (Persian: علي هديه عليا) (Note: Also romanized as ‘Alī Hedyeh-ye ‘Olyā; also known as Alī Hedye Bala, ‘Alī Hedyeh, and ‘Alī Hedyeh-ye Bālā) is a village in Lanu Rural District of Doreh District in Sarbisheh County, South Khorasan province, Iran.

== Demographics ==
=== Population ===
At the time of the 2006 National Census, the village's population was 239 in 64 households, when it was in Doreh Rural District of the Central District. The following census in 2011 counted 204 people in 66 households. The 2016 census measured the population of the village as 201 people in 64 households, by which time the rural district had been separated from the district in the formation of Doreh District. Ali Hedyeh-ye Olya was transferred to Lanu Rural District created in the new district.
