= Hoseynabad-e Gheynab =

Village in South Khorasan province, Iran

Hoseynabad-e Gheynab Persian: حسين ابادغيناب
- Village
- Location within Iran
- Coordinates: 32°29′07″N 60°12′55″E
- Country: Iran
- Province: South Khorasan
- County: Sarbisheh
- District: Central
- Rural District: Gheynab

Population (2016)
  - Total: 30
- Time zone: UTC+3:30 (IRST)

Hoseynabad-e Gheynab (Persian: حسين ابادغيناب) (Note: Also romanized as Ḩoseynābād-e Gheynāb, Hoseynabad-e Ghinab, and Ḩoseynābād-e Ghīnāb; also known as Ḩasanābād, Ḩoseynābād, Ḩoseynābād-e Ghīāb, and Husainābād) is a village in Gheynab Rural District of the Central District in Sarbisheh County, South Khorasan province, Iran.

== Demographics ==
At the time of the 2006 National Census, the village's population was 27 in seven households, when it was in Momenabad Rural District. The following census in 2011 counted 17 people in five households. The 2016 census measured the population of the village as 30 people in 11 households, by which time it had been separated from the rural district in the formation of Gheynab Rural District.
