= Chah Khoshkan =

Village in South Khorasan province, Iran

Chah Khoshkan Persian: چاه خشكان
- Village
- Location within Iran
- Coordinates: 32°29′06″N 60°01′56″E
- Country: Iran
- Province: South Khorasan
- County: Sarbisheh
- District: Central
- Rural District: Gheynab

Population (2016)
  - Total: 0
- Time zone: UTC+3:30 (IRST)

Chah Khoshkan (Persian: چاه خشكان) (Note: Also romanized as Chāh Khoshkān) is a village in Gheynab Rural District of the Central District in Sarbisheh County, South Khorasan province, Iran.

== Demographics ==
At the time of the 2006 National Census, the village's population was 61 in 11 households, when it was in Momenabad Rural District. The village did not appear in the following census of 2011. The 2016 census measured the population of the village as zero, by which time it had been separated from the rural district in the formation of Gheynab Rural District.
