= Makhunik =

Village in South Khorasan province, Iran

Makhunik Persian: ماخونيك
- Village
- Location within Iran
- Coordinates: 32°27′24″N 60°24′30″E
- Country: Iran
- Province: South Khorasan
- County: Sarbisheh
- District: Doreh
- Rural District: Doreh

Population (2016)
  - Total: 787
- Time zone: UTC+3:30 (IRST)

Makhunik (Persian: ماخونيك) (Note: Also romanized as Makhoonik and Mākhūnīk; also known as Māh Khūnīk, Māh-i-Khūnik, Māh-i-Khūpik, and Mak-i-Khūnik) is a village in Doreh Rural District of Doreh District in Sarbisheh County, South Khorasan province, Iran.

== Demographics ==
=== Population ===
At the time of the 2006 National Census, the village's population was 582 in 125 households, when it was in the Central District. The following census in 2011 counted 739 people in 164 households. The 2016 census measured the population of the village as 787 people in 172 households, by which time the rural district had been separated from the district in the formation of Doreh District.
