= Golab-e Bala =

Village in South Khorasan province, Iran

Golab-e Bala Persian: گلاب بالا
- Village
- Location within Iran
- Country: Iran
- Province: South Khorasan
- County: Sarbisheh
- District: Central
- Rural District: Gheynab

Population (2016)
  - Total: 34
- Time zone: UTC+3:30 (IRST)

Golab-e Bala (Persian: گلاب بالا) (Note: Also romanized as Golāb-e Bālā; also known as Golāb) is a village in Gheynab Rural District of the Central District in Sarbisheh County, South Khorasan province, Iran.

== Demographics ==
At the time of the 2006 National Census, the village's population was 24 in seven households, when it was in Momenabad Rural District. The following census in 2011 counted 23 people in six households. The 2016 census measured the population of the village as 34 people in nine households, by which time it had been separated from the rural district in the formation of Gheynab Rural District.
