= Chah Shahid Ashrafi Isfahani =

Village in South Khorasan province, Iran

Chah Shahid Ashrafi Isfahani Persian: چاه شهيداشرفي اصفهاني
- Village
- Location within Iran
- Coordinates: 32°33′15″N 60°03′35″E
- Country: Iran
- Province: South Khorasan
- County: Sarbisheh
- District: Central
- Rural District: Gheynab

Population (2016)
  - Total: 130
- Time zone: UTC+3:30 (IRST)

Chah Shahid Ashrafi Isfahani (Persian: چاه شهيداشرفي اصفهاني) (Note: Also romanized as Chāh Shahīd Āshrafī Iṣfahānī; also known as Jannatabad) is a village in Gheynab Rural District of the Central District in Sarbisheh County, South Khorasan province, Iran.

== Demographics ==
At the time of the 2006 National Census, the village's population was 173 in 35 households, when it was in Momenabad Rural District. The following census in 2011 counted 152 people in 37 households. The 2016 census measured the population of the village as 130 people in 33 households, by which time it had been separated from the rural district in the formation of Gheynab Rural District.
