= Dugh-e Sar Bisheh =

Village in South Khorasan province, Iran

Dugh-e Sar Bisheh Persian: دوغ سربيشه
- Village
- Location within Iran
- Coordinates: 32°36′47″N 59°59′11″E
- Country: Iran
- Province: South Khorasan
- County: Sarbisheh
- District: Central
- Rural District: Gheynab

Population (2016)
  - Total: Below reporting threshold
- Time zone: UTC+3:30 (IRST)

Dugh-e Sar Bisheh (Persian: دوغ سربيشه) (Note: Also romanized as Dūgh-e Sar Bīsheh and Dūgh-e Sar-e Bīsheh; also known as Doogh and Dūgh) is a village in Gheynab Rural District of the Central District in Sarbisheh County, South Khorasan province, Iran.

== Demographics ==
At the time of the 2006 National Census, the village's population was 56 in 15 households, when it was in Momenabad Rural District. The following census in 2011 counted 36 people in 13 households. The 2016 census measured the population of the village as below the reporting threshold, by which time it had been separated from the rural district in the formation of Gheynab Rural District.
