= Golestan, South Khorasan =

Village in South Khorasan province, Iran

Golestan Persian: گلستان
- Village
- Location within Iran
- Country: Iran
- Province: South Khorasan
- County: Sarbisheh
- District: Central
- Rural District: Gheynab

Population (2016)
  - Total: 28
- Time zone: UTC+3:30 (IRST)

Golestan (Persian: گلستان) (Note: Also romanized as Golestān; also known as Kalāteh-i-Gulistān) is a village in Gheynab Rural District of the Central District in Sarbisheh County, South Khorasan province, Iran.

== Demographics ==
At the time of the 2006 National Census, the village's population was 47 in 13 households, when it was in Momenabad Rural District. The following census in 2011 counted 34 people in 11 households. The 2016 census measured the population of the village as 28 people in 10 households, by which time it had been separated from the rural district in the formation of Gheynab Rural District.
