= Kharestan, South Khorasan =

Village in South Khorasan province, Iran

Kharestan Persian: خارستان
- Village
- Location within Iran
- Country: Iran
- Province: South Khorasan
- County: Sarbisheh
- District: Doreh
- Rural District: Doreh

Population (2016)
  - Total: 80
- Time zone: UTC+3:30 (IRST)

Kharestan (Persian: خارستان) (Note: Also romanized as Khārestān) is a village in Doreh Rural District of Doreh District in Sarbisheh County, South Khorasan province, Iran.

== Demographics ==
=== Population ===
At the time of the 2006 National Census, the village's population was 76 in 15 households, when it was in the Central District. The following census in 2011 counted 69 people in 19 households. The 2016 census measured the population of the village as 80 people in 21 households, by which time the rural district had been separated from the district in the formation of Doreh District.
