= Nargesk =

Village in South Khorasan province, Iran

Nargesk Persian: نرگسك
- Village
- Country: Iran
- Province: South Khorasan
- County: Sarbisheh
- District: Central
- Rural District: Gheynab

Population (2016)
  - Total: 32
- Time zone: UTC+3:30 (IRST)

Nargesk (Persian: نرگسك) is a village in Gheynab Rural District of the Central District in Sarbisheh County, South Khorasan province, Iran.

== Demographics ==
At the time of the 2006 National Census, the village's population was 39 in eight households, when it was in Momenabad Rural District. The following census in 2011 counted 27 people in seven households. The 2016 census measured the population of the village as 32 people in 10 households, by which time it had been separated from the rural district in the formation of Gheynab Rural District.
