= Kapugaz =

Kapugaz كپوگز
- Village
- Location within Iran
- Coordinates: 32°36′52″N 59°37′04″E
- Country: Iran
- Province: South Khorasan
- County: Sarbisheh
- Bakhsh: Central
- Rural District: Momenabad

Population (2006)
  - Total: 120
- Time zone: UTC+3:30 (IRST)
  - Summer (DST): UTC+4:30 (IRDT)

Kapugaz (Persian: كپوگز, also Romanized as Kapūgaz; also known as Kafūgaz and Kafūzak) is a village in Momenabad Rural District, in the Central District of Sarbisheh County, South Khorasan Province, Iran. At the 2006 census, its population was 120, in 35 families.
