= Chestak-e Sofla =

Village in South Khorasan province, Iran

Chestak-e Sofla Persian: چست ك سفلي
- Village
- Location within Iran
- Coordinates: 32°36′29″N 60°04′54″E
- Country: Iran
- Province: South Khorasan
- County: Sarbisheh
- District: Central
- Rural District: Gheynab

Population (2016)
  - Total: 26
- Time zone: UTC+3:30 (IRST)

Chestak-e Sofla (Persian: چست ك سفلي) (Note: Also romanized as Chestak-e Soflá; also known as Chestak-e Pain (چستك پائين)) is a village in Gheynab Rural District of the Central District in Sarbisheh County, South Khorasan province, Iran.

== Demographics ==
At the time of the 2006 National Census, the village's population was below the reporting threshold, when it was in Momenabad Rural District. The village did not appear in the following census of 2011. The 2016 census measured the population of the village as 26 people in four households, by which time it had been separated from the rural district in the formation of Gheynab Rural District.
