= Ali Hedyeh-ye Pain =

Village in South Khorasan province, Iran

Ali Hedyeh-ye Pain Persian: علي هديه پايين
- Village
- Location within Iran
- Coordinates: 32°20′39″N 60°37′34″E
- Country: Iran
- Province: South Khorasan
- County: Sarbisheh
- District: Doreh
- Rural District: Lanu

Population (2016)
  - Total: 100
- Time zone: UTC+3:30 (IRST)

Ali Hedyeh-ye Pain (Persian: علي هديه پايين) (Note: Also romanized as ‘Alī Hedyeh-ye Pā’īn; also known as 'Alī Hadīyeh, Ali Hedyeh Pa’in, and ‘Alī Hedyeh-ye Soflá) is a village in Lanu Rural District of Doreh District in Sarbisheh County, South Khorasan province, Iran.

== Demographics ==
=== Population ===
At the time of the 2006 National Census, the village's population was 111 in 29 households, when it was in Doreh Rural District of the Central District. The following census in 2011 counted 93 people in 29 households. The 2016 census measured the population of the village as 100 people in 30 households, by which time the rural district had been separated from the district in the formation of Doreh District. Ali Hedyeh-ye Pain was transferred to Lanu Rural District created in the new district.
