= Maraq =

Maraq or Marq or Marraq (مرق) may refer to:

- Maraq (dish), a Somali soup dish
- Maraq, Azerbaijan, a village in Azerbaijan
- Maraq, Isfahan, a village in Iran
- Maraq, Markazi, a village in Iran

== See also ==
- Marak (disambiguation)
- Marq (disambiguation)
