= Hasan Kolangi =

Village in South Khorasan province, Iran

Hasan Kolangi Persian: حسن كلنگي
- Village
- Location within Iran
- Coordinates: 32°34′39″N 59°56′52″E
- Country: Iran
- Province: South Khorasan
- County: Sarbisheh
- District: Central
- Rural District: Gheynab

Population (2016)
  - Total: 43
- Time zone: UTC+3:30 (IRST)

Hasan Kolangi (Persian: حسن كلنگي) (Note: Also romanized as Hasan Kolangī) is a village in Gheynab Rural District of the Central District in Sarbisheh County, South Khorasan province, Iran.

== Demographics ==
At the time of the 2006 National Census, the village's population was 62 in 16 households, when it was in Momenabad Rural District. The following census in 2011 counted 49 people in 14 households. The 2016 census measured the population of the village as 43 people in 13 households, by which time it had been separated from the rural district in the formation of Gheynab Rural District.
