= Naz Dasht =

Village in South Khorasan province, Iran

Naz Dasht Persian: نازدشت
- Village
- Location within Iran
- Coordinates: 32°25′31″N 60°11′06″E
- Country: Iran
- Province: South Khorasan
- County: Sarbisheh
- District: Central
- Rural District: Gheynab

Population (2016)
  - Total: 990
- Time zone: UTC+3:30 (IRST)

Naz Dasht (Persian: نازدشت) (Note: Also romanized as Nāz Dasht) is a village in, and the capital of, Gheynab Rural District in the Central District of Sarbisheh County, South Khorasan province, Iran.

== Demographics ==
At the time of the 2006 National Census, the village's population was 743 in 166 households, when it was in Momenabad Rural District. The following census in 2011 counted 901 people in 234 households. The 2016 census measured the population of the village as 990 people in 269 households, by which time it had been separated from the rural district in the formation of Gheynab Rural District. It was the most populous village in its rural district.
