= Pureng =

Village in South Khorasan province, Iran

Pureng Persian: پورنگ
- Village
- Location within Iran
- Coordinates: 32°27′07″N 60°03′58″E
- Country: Iran
- Province: South Khorasan
- County: Sarbisheh
- District: Central
- Rural District: Gheynab

Population (2016)
  - Total: 0
- Time zone: UTC+3:30 (IRST)

Pureng (Persian: پورنگ) (Note: Also romanized as Pūreng; also known as Poreng (پرنگ)) is a village in Gheynab Rural District of the Central District in Sarbisheh County, South Khorasan province, Iran.

== Demographics ==
At the time of the 2006 National Census, the village's population was 56 in 12 households, when it was in Momenabad Rural District. The following census in 2011 counted 33 people in eight households. The 2016 census measured the population of the village as zero, by which time it had been separated from the rural district in the formation of Gheynab Rural District.
