= Lanu, South Khorasan =

Village in South Khorasan province, Iran

Lanu Persian: لانو
- Village
- Location within Iran
- Coordinates: 32°29′09″N 60°32′09″E
- Country: Iran
- Province: South Khorasan
- County: Sarbisheh
- District: Doreh
- Rural District: Lanu

Population (2016)
  - Total: 397
- Time zone: UTC+3:30 (IRST)

Lanu (Persian: لانو) (Note: Also romanized as Lanoo and Lānū; also known as Lāhnū) is a village in, and the capital of, Lanu Rural District in Doreh District of Sarbisheh County, South Khorasan province, Iran.

== Demographics ==
=== Population ===
At the time of the 2006 National Census, the village's population was 342 in 89 households, when it was in Doreh Rural District of the Central District. The following census in 2011 counted 404 people in 99 households. The 2016 census measured the population of the village as 397 people in 113 households, by which time the rural district had been separated from the district in the formation of Doreh District. Lanu was transferred to Lanu Rural District created in the new district. It was the most populous village in its rural district.
