= Maraka (disambiguation) =

Marka people (also Marka Dafing, Meka, or Maraka), people are a Mande people of northwest Mali. They speak the Marka, a Manding language.

Maraka may also refer to:

- Maraka, Central Province, a village in Sri Lanka
- Maraka (Hindu astrology), in Hindu astrology, the planet or planets causing death at the end of a particular life-span
- Aziz Maraka (born 1983), Jordanian music composer, singer, performer, recording artist, and producer
- Marakkar, a Muslim caste in India

== See also ==
- George M. Marakas, American author, scholar, research scientist, professor, consultant, entrepreneur
- Marakan, a village in Ivughli Rural District, Ivughli District, Khoy County, West Azerbaijan Province, Iran
- Marka (disambiguation)
- Marak (disambiguation)
- Mark (disambiguation)
