= Qaleh Sorkh, South Khorasan =

Village in South Khorasan province, Iran

Qaleh Sorkh Persian: قلعه سرخ
- Village
- Location within Iran
- Coordinates: 32°30′05″N 59°59′26″E
- Country: Iran
- Province: South Khorasan
- County: Sarbisheh
- District: Central
- Rural District: Gheynab

Population (2016)
  - Total: 36
- Time zone: UTC+3:30 (IRST)

Qaleh Sorkh (Persian: قلعه سرخ) (Note: Also romanized as Qal‘eh Sorkh; also known as Ghal‘eh Sorkh and Qal‘eh Surkh) is a village in Gheynab Rural District of the Central District in Sarbisheh County, South Khorasan province, Iran.

== Demographics ==
At the time of the 2006 National Census, the village's population was 44 in 10 households, when it was in Momenabad Rural District. The following census in 2011 counted 34 people in seven households. The 2016 census measured the population of the village as 36 people in 10 households, by which time it had been separated from the rural district in the formation of Gheynab Rural District.
