= Lojunk-e Sofla =

Village in South Khorasan province, Iran

Lojunk-e Sofla Persian: لجونك سفلي
- Village
- Location within Iran
- Coordinates: 32°32′50″N 60°25′09″E
- Country: Iran
- Province: South Khorasan
- County: Sarbisheh
- District: Doreh
- Rural District: Doreh

Population (2016)
  - Total: 210
- Time zone: UTC+3:30 (IRST)

Lojunk-e Sofla (Persian: لجونك سفلي) (Note: Also romanized as Lojūnk-e Soflá; also known as Lajnak, Lojeng-e Pā’īn, Lojeng-e Soflá, Lojong Pā’īn, and Lūjung) is a village in Doreh Rural District of Doreh District in Sarbisheh County, South Khorasan province, Iran.

== Demographics ==
=== Population ===
At the time of the 2006 National Census, the village's population was 158 in 32 households, when it was in the Central District. The following census in 2011 counted 194 people in 48 households. The 2016 census measured the population of the village as 210 people in 55 households, by which time the rural district had been separated from the district in the formation of Doreh District.
