= Bagh-e Sangi =

Village in South Khorasan province, Iran

Bagh-e Sangi Persian: باغ سنگی
- Village
- Location within Iran
- Coordinates: 32°22′06″N 60°26′28″E
- Country: Iran
- Province: South Khorasan
- County: Sarbisheh
- District: Doreh
- Rural District: Doreh

Population (2016)
  - Total: 116
- Time zone: UTC+3:30 (IRST)

Bagh-e Sangi (Persian: باغ سنگی) (Note: Also romanized as Bāgh Sangī and Bāgh-e Sangī) is a village in Doreh Rural District of Doreh District in Sarbisheh County, South Khorasan province, Iran.

== Demographics ==
=== Population ===
At the time of the 2006 National Census, the village's population was 109 in 29 households, when it was in the Central District. The following census in 2011 counted 103 people in 35 households. The 2016 census measured the population of the village as 116 people in 34 households, by which time the rural district had been separated from the district in the formation of Doreh District.
