= Kanif =

Village in South Khorasan province, Iran

Kanif Persian: كنيف
- Village
- Location within Iran
- Coordinates: 32°24′17″N 60°19′45″E
- Country: Iran
- Province: South Khorasan
- County: Sarbisheh
- District: Doreh
- Rural District: Doreh

Population (2016)
  - Total: 30
- Time zone: UTC+3:30 (IRST)

Kanif (Persian: كنيف) (Note: Also romanized as Kanīf; also known as Keneft) is a village in Doreh Rural District of Doreh District in Sarbisheh County, South Khorasan province, Iran.

== Demographics ==
=== Population ===
At the time of the 2006 National Census, the village's population was 29 in nine households, when it was in the Central District. The following census in 2011 counted 42 people in 10 households. The 2016 census measured the population of the village as 30 people in 10 households, by which time the rural district had been separated from the district in the formation of Doreh District.
