= Tutak, South Khorasan =

Village in South Khorasan province, Iran

Tutak Persian: توتك
- Village
- Location within Iran
- Coordinates: 32°28′19″N 60°21′29″E
- Country: Iran
- Province: South Khorasan
- County: Sarbisheh
- District: Doreh
- Rural District: Doreh

Population (2016)
  - Total: 200
- Time zone: UTC+3:30 (IRST)

Tutak (Persian: توتك) (Note: Also romanized as Tūtak) is a village in Doreh Rural District of Doreh District in Sarbisheh County, South Khorasan province, Iran.

== Demographics ==
=== Population ===
At the time of the 2006 National Census, the village's population was 179 in 41 households, when it was in the Central District. The following census in 2011 counted 197 people in 48 households. The 2016 census measured the population of the village as 200 people in 56 households, by which time the rural district had been separated from the district in the formation of Doreh District.
