= Chah Khu =

Village in South Khorasan province, Iran

Chah Khu Persian: چاه خو
- Village
- Location within Iran
- Coordinates: 32°15′25″N 60°04′17″E
- Country: Iran
- Province: South Khorasan
- County: Sarbisheh
- District: Central
- Rural District: Gheynab

Population (2016)
  - Total: 196
- Time zone: UTC+3:30 (IRST)

Chah Khu (Persian: چاه خو) (Note: Also romanized as Chāh Khū) is a village in Gheynab Rural District of the Central District in Sarbisheh County, South Khorasan province, Iran.

== Demographics ==
At the time of the 2006 National Census, the village's population was 200 in 44 households, when it was in Momenabad Rural District. The following census in 2011 counted 195 people in 52 households. The 2016 census measured the population of the village as 196 people in 50 households, by which time it had been separated from the rural district in the formation of Gheynab Rural District.
