= Dehik, South Khorasan =

Village in South Khorasan province, Iran

Dehik Persian: دهيك
- Village
- Location within Iran
- Coordinates: 32°39′59″N 59°59′07″E
- Country: Iran
- Province: South Khorasan
- County: Sarbisheh
- District: Central
- Rural District: Gheynab

Population (2016)
  - Total: 90
- Time zone: UTC+3:30 (IRST)

Dehik (Persian: دهيك) (Note: Also romanized as Dehīk; also known as Dehīki) is a village in Gheynab Rural District of the Central District in Sarbisheh County, South Khorasan province, Iran.

== Demographics ==
At the time of the 2006 National Census, the village's population was 153 in 44 households, when it was in Momenabad Rural District. The following census in 2011 counted 109 people in 32 households. The 2016 census measured the population of the village as 90 people in 25 households, by which time it had been separated from the rural district in the formation of Gheynab Rural District.
