= Nomadic center =

Nomadic center محل چادرهائ عشايرئ دو راهي پخت
- Village/nomadic center
- Country: Iran
- Province: South Khorasan
- County: Sarbisheh
- Bakhsh: Central
- Rural District: Momenabad

Population (2006)
  - Total: 30
- Time zone: UTC+3:30 (IRST)
  - Summer (DST): UTC+4:30 (IRDT)

Nomadic center (Persian: محل چادرهائ عشايرئ دو راهي پخت, also Romanized as Maḥal Chādarhāy ʿAshāīry Dū Rāhī Pakht) is a village and nomadic center in Momenabad Rural District, in the Central District of Sarbisheh County, South Khorasan Province, Iran. At the 2006 census, its population was 30, in 9 families.
