= Bahamarz =

Village in South Khorasan province, Iran

Bahamarz Persian: بهامرز
- Village
- Location within Iran
- Coordinates: 32°19′35″N 60°05′25″E
- Country: Iran
- Province: South Khorasan
- County: Sarbisheh
- District: Central
- Rural District: Gheynab

Population (2016)
  - Total: 86
- Time zone: UTC+3:30 (IRST)

Bahamarz (Persian: بهامرز) (Note: Also romanized as Bahāmarz; also known as Bāmarz) is a village in Gheynab Rural District of the Central District in Sarbisheh County, South Khorasan province, Iran.

== Demographics ==
At the time of the 2006 National Census, the village's population was 121 in 34 households, when it was in Momenabad Rural District. The following census in 2011 counted 76 people in 17 households. The 2016 census measured the population of the village as 86 people in 28 households, by which time it had been separated from the rural district in the formation of Gheynab Rural District.
