= Mahirud =

Village in South Khorasan province, Iran

Mahirud Persian: ماهي رود
- Village
- Location within Iran
- Coordinates: 32°11′21″N 60°41′53″E
- Country: Iran
- Province: South Khorasan
- County: Sarbisheh
- District: Doreh
- Rural District: Doreh

Population (2016)
  - Total: 562
- Time zone: UTC+3:30 (IRST)

Mahirud (Persian: ماهي رود) (Note: Also romanized as Mahi Rood and Māhīrūd; also known as Mahrūd and Māhrūd) is a village in Doreh Rural District of Doreh District in Sarbisheh County, South Khorasan province, Iran.

== Demographics ==
=== Population ===
At the time of the 2006 National Census, the village's population was 331 in 108 households, when it was in the Central District. The following census in 2011 counted 356 people in 90 households. The 2016 census measured the population of the village as 562 people in 132 households, by which time the rural district had been separated from the district in the formation of Doreh District.
