= Marek =

Marek is the West Slavic (Czech, Polish and Slovak) masculine equivalent of Marcus, Marc or Mark. The name may refer to:

- Marek (given name)
- Marek (surname)
- Marek, the pseudonym of Bulgarian communist Stanke Dimitrov (1889–1944)
- The title character of Oberinspektor Marek, an Austrian television series

== See also ==
- Marek's disease
- VC Marek Union-Ivkoni, Bulgarian professional men's volleyball team, based in Dupnitsa
- Marek i Wacek (meaning Marek and Wacek), a musical duo of Polish pianists Marek Tomaszewski and Wacław "Wacek" Kisielewski
- Marik (disambiguation)
- Marrick
- Merrick (disambiguation)
- Mereg, also spelled Merek, a village in Iran
