= Nomadic center of 28 tents =

Nomadic center of 28 tents محل 28چادرهاي عشايري
- Village/nomadic center
- Country: Iran
- Province: South Khorasan
- County: Sarbisheh
- Bakhsh: Central
- Rural District: Momenabad

Population (2006)
  - Total: 69
- Time zone: UTC+3:30 (IRST)
  - Summer (DST): UTC+4:30 (IRDT)

Nomadic center of 28 tents (Persian: محل 28چادرهاي عشايري, also Romanized as Maḥal 28 Chāderhāī ʿAshāīrī) is a village and nomadic center in Momenabad Rural District, in the Central District of Sarbisheh County, South Khorasan Province, Iran. At the 2006 census, its population was 69, in 14 families.
