= Marufan =

Village in South Khorasan province, Iran

Marufan Persian: معروفان
- Village
- Location within Iran
- Coordinates: 32°18′27″N 60°04′34″E
- Country: Iran
- Province: South Khorasan
- County: Sarbisheh
- District: Central
- Rural District: Gheynab

Population (2016)
  - Total: 77
- Time zone: UTC+3:30 (IRST)

Marufan (Persian: معروفان) (Note: Also romanized as Ma‘roofan and Ma‘rūfān; also known as Marūfūn) is a village in Gheynab Rural District of the Central District in Sarbisheh County, South Khorasan province, Iran.

== Demographics ==
At the time of the 2006 National Census, the village's population was 90 in 36 households, when it was in Momenabad Rural District. The following census in 2011 counted 79 people in 20 households. The 2016 census measured the population of the village as 77 people in 22 households, by which time it had been separated from the rural district in the formation of Gheynab Rural District.
