= Taj Mir =

Village in South Khorasan province, Iran

Taj Mir Persian: تاج مير
- Village
- Location within Iran
- Coordinates: 32°31′30″N 60°08′35″E
- Country: Iran
- Province: South Khorasan
- County: Sarbisheh
- District: Central
- Rural District: Gheynab

Population (2016)
  - Total: 320
- Time zone: UTC+3:30 (IRST)

Taj Mir (Persian: تاج مير) (Note: Also romanized as Tāj Mīr) is a village in Gheynab Rural District of the Central District in Sarbisheh County, South Khorasan province, Iran.

== Demographics ==
At the time of the 2006 National Census, the village's population was 284 in 56 households, when it was in Momenabad Rural District. The following census in 2011 counted 281 people in 62 households. The 2016 census measured the population of the village as 320 people in 77 households, by which time it had been separated from the rural district in the formation of Gheynab Rural District.
