= Ebrahimabad, Gheynab =

Village in South Khorasan province, Iran

Ebrahimabad Persian: ابراهيم اباد
- Village
- Location within Iran
- Coordinates: 32°39′59″N 60°02′51″E
- Country: Iran
- Province: South Khorasan
- County: Sarbisheh
- District: Central
- Rural District: Gheynab

Population (2016)
  - Total: 61
- Time zone: UTC+3:30 (IRST)

Ebrahimabad (Persian: ابراهيم اباد) (Note: Also romanized as Ebrāhīmābād and Ibrāhīmābād) is a village in Gheynab Rural District of the Central District in Sarbisheh County, South Khorasan province, Iran.

== Demographics ==
At the time of the 2006 National Census, the village's population was 69 in 21 households, when it was in Darmian Rural District of the Central District in Darmian County. The following census in 2011 counted 82 people in 28 households, by which time the village had been transferred to Momenabad Rural District in the Central District of Sarbisheh County. The 2016 census measured the population of the village as 61 people in 19 households, when the village had been separated from the rural district in the formation of Gheynab Rural District.
