= Aliabad, Momenabad =

Village in South Khorasan province, Iran

Aliabad Persian: علي اباد
- Village
- Location within Iran
- Coordinates: 32°21′51″N 59°43′20″E
- Country: Iran
- Province: South Khorasan
- County: Sarbisheh
- District: Central
- Rural District: Momenabad

Population (2016)
  - Total: 449
- Time zone: UTC+3:30 (IRST)

Aliabad (Persian: علي اباد) (Note: Also romanized as ‘Alīābād; also known as Ali Abad Mo’men Abad) is a village in Momenabad Rural District of the Central District in Sarbisheh County, South Khorasan province, Iran.

== Demographics ==
=== Population ===
At the time of the 2006 National Census, the village's population was 400 in 102 households. The following census in 2011 counted 459 people in 134 households. The 2016 census measured the population of the village as 449 people in 134 households.
