= Zulesk =

Village in South Khorasan province, Iran

Zulesk Persian: زولسك
- Village
- Location within Iran
- Coordinates: 32°42′41″N 59°51′18″E
- Country: Iran
- Province: South Khorasan
- County: Sarbisheh
- District: Central
- Rural District: Momenabad

Population (2016)
  - Total: 254
- Time zone: UTC+3:30 (IRST)

Zulesk (Persian: زولسك) (Note: Also romanized as Z̄ūlesk; also known as Zahisk, Zolisk, and Zūleng) is a village in Momenabad Rural District of the Central District in Sarbisheh County, South Khorasan province, Iran.

== Demographics ==
=== Population ===
At the time of the 2006 National Census, the village's population was 236 in 63 households. The following census in 2011 counted 328 people in 91 households. The 2016 census measured the population of the village as 254 people in 77 households.
