= Qaleh Qonbar =

Qaleh Qonbar (Persian: قلعه قنبر) may refer to:

- Qaleh-ye Qanbar, in Lorestan Province
- Qaleh Qonbar, South Khorasan
