= Gurid-e Sar Bisheh =

Gurid-e Sar Bisheh گوريدسربيشه
- Village
- Location within Iran
- Coordinates: 32°32′32″N 59°41′06″E
- Country: Iran
- Province: South Khorasan
- County: Sarbisheh
- Bakhsh: Central
- Rural District: Momenabad

Population (2006)
  - Total: 93
- Time zone: UTC+3:30 (IRST)
  - Summer (DST): UTC+4:30 (IRDT)

Gurid-e Sar Bisheh (Persian: گوريدسربيشه, also Romanized as Gūrīd-e Sar Bīsheh and Gurīd-i-Sarbīsheh; also known as Goorid, Gūrīd, and Gūrīd Pā’īn) is a village in Momenabad Rural District, in the Central District of Sarbisheh County, South Khorasan Province, Iran. At the 2006 census, its population was 93, in 24 families.
