= Gurid =

Gurid or Goorid (Persian: گوريد) may refer to:

- Ghurid dynasty

== Places ==
- Gurid-e Bala
- Gurid-e Sar Bisheh
