= Kabad =

Village in South Khorasan province, Iran

Kabad Persian: كباد
- Village
- Location within Iran
- Coordinates: 32°13′50″N 60°29′17″E
- Country: Iran
- Province: South Khorasan
- County: Sarbisheh
- District: Doreh
- Rural District: Doreh

Population (2016)
  - Total: 44
- Time zone: UTC+3:30 (IRST)

Kabad (Persian: كباد) (Note: Also romanized as Kabād and Kobād; also known as Burj-ı-Qanāt, Gū Āt, Kabāt, and Kobāt) is a village in Doreh Rural District of Doreh District in Sarbisheh County, South Khorasan province, Iran.

== Demographics ==
=== Population ===
At the time of the 2006 National Census, the village's population was 37 in eight households, when it was in the Central District. The following census in 2011 counted 30 people in eight households. The 2016 census measured the population of the village as 44 people in 11 households, by which time the rural district had been separated from the district in the formation of Doreh District.
