= Hojjatabad, Sarbisheh =

Village in South Khorasan province, Iran

Hojjatabad Persian: حجت اباد
- Village
- Location within Iran
- Coordinates: 32°21′52″N 59°52′25″E
- Country: Iran
- Province: South Khorasan
- County: Sarbisheh
- District: Central
- Rural District: Momenabad

Population (2016)
  - Total: 217
- Time zone: UTC+3:30 (IRST)

Hojjatabad (Persian: حجت‌آباد) (Note: Also romanized as Ḩojjatābād; also known as Khānlarābād (خانلراباد) and Sartak) is a village in Momenabad Rural District of the Central District in Sarbisheh County, South Khorasan province, Iran.

== Demographics ==
=== Population ===
At the time of the 2006 National Census, the village's population was 245 in 58 households. The following census in 2011 counted 197 people in 55 households. The 2016 census measured the population of the village as 217 people in 64 households.
