= Fakhr ol Din =

Fakhr ol Din (Persian: فخرالدين) may refer to:

- Fakhr ol Din, North Khorasan
- Fakhr ol Din, South Khorasan
