= Cheshmeh Zangi, South Khorasan =

Village in South Khorasan province, Iran

Cheshmeh Zangi Persian: چشمه زنگي
- Village
- Location within Iran
- Coordinates: 32°27′05″N 59°59′09″E
- Country: Iran
- Province: South Khorasan
- County: Sarbisheh
- District: Central
- Rural District: Gheynab

Population (2016)
  - Total: 0
- Time zone: UTC+3:30 (IRST)

Cheshmeh Zangi (Persian: چشمه زنگي) (Note: Also romanized as Chashmeh Zangī, Chashmeh-i-Zangi, and Cheshmeh Zangī; also known as Chashmeh Rangī and Zangīābād) is a village in Gheynab Rural District of the Central District in Sarbisheh County, South Khorasan province, Iran.

== Demographics ==
At the time of the 2006 National Census, the village's population was 38 in 10 households, when it was in Momenabad Rural District. The following census in 2011 counted 36 people in nine households. The 2016 census measured the population of the village as zero, by which time it had been separated from the rural district in the formation of Gheynab Rural District.
