= Lanu Rural District =

Rural district in South Khorasan province, Iran

Lanu Rural District Persian: دهستان لانو
- Rural District
- Location within Iran
- Coordinates: 32°21′N 60°38′E
- Country: Iran
- Province: South Khorasan
- County: Sarbisheh
- District: Doreh
- Established: 2010
- Capital: Lanu

Population (2016)
  - Total: 4,192
- Time zone: UTC+3:30 (IRST)

Lanu Rural District (Persian: دهستان لانو) is in Doreh District of Sarbisheh County, South Khorasan province, Iran. Its capital is the village of Lanu.

== History ==
In 2010, Doreh Rural District was separated from the Central District in the formation of Doreh District, and Lanu Rural District was created in the new district.

== Demographics ==
=== Population ===
At the time of the 2016 National Census, the rural district's population was 4,192 in 1,237 households. The most populous of its 37 villages was Lanu, with 397 people.

=== Other villages in the rural district ===
- Abbasabad
- Ali Hedyeh-ye Olya
- Ali Hedyeh-ye Pain
- Bagh-e Khvajeh
- Bisheh
- Dahan-e Tangal
- Darakht-e Tut
- Darbelund
- Galu Bagh
- Gavi-ye Sofla
- Kalateh-ye Dahan Do Tagi
- Kalateh-ye Masib
- Kalateh-ye Shab
- Kalateh-ye Shir
- Kalateh-ye Shir-e Pain
- Khvoshab
- Markeh
- Mashuki
- Nowdeh-e Olya
- Ozbak
- Puzeh-ye Zard
- Rahimabad-e Lanu
- Shabu
- Shurkeh
- Tajeshk
- Tut
