= Kalateh-ye Bala =

Kalateh-ye Bala (Persian: كلاته بالا) may refer to:

- Kalateh-ye Bali, in North Khorasan Province
- Kalateh-ye Bala, Qaen, in South Khorasan Province
- Kalateh-ye Bala, Sarbisheh, in South Khorasan Province

== See also ==
- Kalat-e Bala (disambiguation)
