= Marka =

Marka may refer to:

== Places ==
- Marka (river), Lower Saxony, Germany
- Marka, Iran, a village in South Khorasan Province
- Marka, Malawi a town in Nsanje District
- Marka district, Jordan
- Marka refugee camp, a Palestinian refugee camp in Jordan
- Marka International Airport, an alternative name for Amman Civil Airport in Jordan
- Marka, Oslo, the area surrounding Oslo, Norway
- Marka (launch site), a missile launch site in Norway
- Merca (Somali: Marka), a port city in Somalia

== Currency ==
- Bosnia and Herzegovina convertible mark (konvertibilna marka), the currency of Bosnia and Herzegovina
- Polish mark (marka polska), the currency of the Kingdom of Poland and the Republic of Poland between 1917 and 1924

== People ==
- Marka people, a people of Mali in Western Africa
- Marka Gjoni (1861–1925), Albanian chieftain
- Marka (singer) (born 1961), Belgian singer, songwriter, composer and film-maker Serge Van Laeken
- Saskia Marka (born 1975), German artist and film title designer
- Sebastian Marka (born 1978), German film director and editor

== Other uses ==
- Marka language, the language of the Marka people
- Publishing and Trade Centre "Marka", a Russian postage stamp publisher and distributor
- Márka, a Hungarian soft drink
- Marka Turkish Trademark

== See also ==
- Finnish markka, the currency of Finland from 1860 until 28 February 2002
- Maraka (disambiguation)
- Markas, a male Lithuanian given name
- Marakkar, a Muslim caste in India
- Marak (disambiguation)
- Mark (disambiguation)
