= Gurid-e Bala =

Gurid-e Bala گوريدبالا
- Village
- Location within Iran
- Coordinates: 32°32′24″N 59°37′15″E
- Country: Iran
- Province: South Khorasan
- County: Sarbisheh
- Bakhsh: Central
- Rural District: Momenabad

Population (2006)
  - Total: 84
- Time zone: UTC+3:30 (IRST)
  - Summer (DST): UTC+4:30 (IRDT)

Gurid-e Bala (Persian: گوريدبالا, also Romanized as Gūrīd-e Bālā; also known as Goorid, Gūrīd, and Kūrīd) is a village in Momenabad Rural District, in the Central District of Sarbisheh County, South Khorasan Province, Iran. At the 2006 census, its population was 84, in 30 families.
