= Ali Hedyeh =

Ali Hedyeh (Persian: علي هديه) may refer to:

- Ali Hedyeh-ye Olya
- Ali Hedyeh-ye Pain
