= Cheshmeh Zangi =

Cheshmeh Zangi (Persian: چشمه زنگي) may refer to:

- Cheshmeh Zangi, Kermanshah
- Cheshmeh Zangi, South Khorasan
