= Gazdez =

Village in South Khorasan province, Iran

Gazdez Persian: گزدز
- Village
- Location within Iran
- Coordinates: 32°21′55″N 59°58′34″E
- Country: Iran
- Province: South Khorasan
- County: Sarbisheh
- District: Central
- Rural District: Momenabad

Population (2016)
  - Total: 274
- Time zone: UTC+3:30 (IRST)

Gazdez (Persian: گزدز) is a village in Momenabad Rural District of the Central District in Sarbisheh County, South Khorasan province, Iran.

== Demographics ==
=== Population ===
At the time of the 2006 National Census, the village's population was 379 in 91 households. The following census in 2011 counted 323 people in 89 households. The 2016 census measured the population of the village as 274 people in 81 households.
