= Qaleh Qonbar, South Khorasan =

Village in South Khorasan province, Iran

Qaleh Qonbar Persian: قلعه قنبر
- Village
- Country: Iran
- Province: South Khorasan
- County: Sarbisheh
- District: Central
- Rural District: Gheynab

Population (2016)
  - Total: 70
- Time zone: UTC+3:30 (IRST)

Qaleh Qonbar (Persian: قلعه قنبر) (Note: Also romanized as Qal‘eh Qonbar; also known as Qonbar (قنبر)) is a village in Gheynab Rural District of the Central District in Sarbisheh County, South Khorasan province, Iran.

== Demographics ==
At the time of the 2006 National Census, the village's population was 75 in 21 households, when it was in Momenabad Rural District. The following census in 2011 counted 73 people in 20 households. The 2016 census measured the population of the village as 70 people in 18 households, by which time it had been separated from the rural district in the formation of Gheynab Rural District.
