= Fakhr ol Din, South Khorasan =

Village in South Khorasan province, Iran

Fakhr ol Din Persian: فخرالدين
- Village
- Location within Iran
- Coordinates: 32°19′59″N 60°31′16″E
- Country: Iran
- Province: South Khorasan
- County: Sarbisheh
- District: Doreh
- Rural District: Doreh

Population (2016)
  - Total: 12
- Time zone: UTC+3:30 (IRST)

Fakhr ol Din (Persian: فخرالدين) (Note: Also romanized as Fakhr ol Dīn; also known as Fakhr od Dīn) is a village in Doreh Rural District of Doreh District in Sarbisheh County, South Khorasan province, Iran.

== Demographics ==
=== Population ===
At the time of the 2006 National Census, the village's population was 51 in 18 households, when it was in the Central District. The following census in 2011 counted 20 people in seven households. The 2016 census measured the population of the village as 12 people in six households, by which time the rural district had been separated from the district in the formation of Doreh District.
