= Mesgaran =

Mesgaran (Persian: مسگران) may refer to:

- Mesgaran, Tus, Mashhad County, Razavi Khorasan Province
- Mesgaran, South Khorasan
