= Marak =

Marak may refer to:

== Places ==
- Marak, Iran, a village in South Khorasan Province, Iran
- Marak, Texas
- Bukit Marak (Marak Hill), village in Bachok, Kelantan, Malaysia

== People ==
- Adolf Lu Hitler Marak (born c. 1958), Indian politician (Nationalist Congress Party)
- Julius Mařák (1832–1899), Czech landscape painter
- Otakar Mařák (1872–1939), Czech opera singer
- Paul Marak (born 1965), American baseball player
- S. C. Marak, Indian politician (Nationalist Congress Party)
- Elstone D Marak, Indian Nationalist Congress Party politician
- Phillipole Marak, Indian National People's Party politician
- Zbyněk Mařák (born 1971), Czech ice hockey player
- Queenbala Marak, Indian anthropologist, academic and author

== See also ==
- Maraq (disambiguation)
- Marka (disambiguation)
- Maraka (disambiguation)
- Mark (disambiguation)
