= Salmabad, Sarbisheh =

Village in South Khorasan province, Iran

Salmabad Persian: سلم اباد
- Village
- Location within Iran
- Coordinates: 32°33′01″N 59°49′07″E
- Country: Iran
- Province: South Khorasan
- County: Sarbisheh
- District: Central
- Rural District: Momenabad

Population (2016)
  - Total: 751
- Time zone: UTC+3:30 (IRST)

Salmabad (Persian: سلم اباد) (Note: Also romanized as Salmābād; also known as Salīmābād and Salm Abad Mo’men Abad) is a village in, and the capital of, Momenabad Rural District in the Central District of Sarbisheh County, South Khorasan province, Iran.

== Demographics ==
=== Population ===
At the time of the 2006 National Census, the village's population was 516 in 148 households. The following census in 2011 counted 656 people in 205 households. The 2016 census measured the population of the village as 751 people in 222 households, the most populous in its rural district.
