= Shirg-e Aqa =

Village in South Khorasan province, Iran

Shirg-e Aqa Persian: شيرگ آقا
- Village
- Location within Iran
- Coordinates: 32°46′32″N 59°46′13″E
- Country: Iran
- Province: South Khorasan
- County: Sarbisheh
- District: Central
- Rural District: Momenabad

Population (2016)
  - Total: 245
- Time zone: UTC+3:30 (IRST)

Shirg-e Aqa (Persian: شيرگ اقا) (Note: Also romanized as Shīrg-e Āqā) is a village in Momenabad Rural District of the Central District in Sarbisheh County, South Khorasan province, Iran.

== Demographics ==
=== Population ===
At the time of the 2006 National Census, the village's population was 383 in 116 households. The following census in 2011 counted 296 people in 103 households. The 2016 census measured the population of the village as 245 people in 93 households.
