= Mesgaran, South Khorasan =

Mesgaran مسگران
- Village
- Country: Iran
- Province: South Khorasan
- County: Sarbisheh
- Bakhsh: Central
- Rural District: Momenabad

Population (2006)
  - Total: 22
- Time zone: UTC+3:30 (IRST)
  - Summer (DST): UTC+4:30 (IRDT)

Mesgaran (Persian: مسگران, also Romanized as Mesgarān) is a village in Momenabad Rural District, Central District, Sarbisheh County, South Khorasan Province, Iran. At the 2006 census, its population was 22, in 5 families.
