= Marik =

Marik may refer to:

- Marik language, an Austronesian language spoken in Papua New Guinea
- Marik Ishtar, a character in the manga Yu-Gi-Oh!
- Marik Vos-Lundh (1923–1994), a Swedish costume designer and production designer
- Anton Marik (1940–2025), an Austrian conductor
- Irén Marik (1905–1986), a Hungarian classical pianist
- Michal Mařík, a Czech ice hockey goaltender
- Paul E. Marik, a professor of medicine and sepsis treatment researcher
- Marik, Iran, a village in Chaharmahal and Bakhtiari Province, Iran
- 28492 Marik, an asteroid
- Marik, another name for Nirig (Mars) in Mandaeism
- House Marik, the ruling family of the Free Worlds League in the BattleTech tabletop game franchise

== See also ==
- Maric (disambiguation)
