= Kalat-e Bala =

Kalat-e Bala (Persian: كلات بالا) may refer to:

- Kalat-e Bala, Hormozgan
- Kalat-e Bala, South Khorasan

== See also ==
- Kalateh-ye Bala (disambiguation)
