= Kalateh-ye Bala, Sarbisheh =

Village in South Khorasan province, Iran

Kalateh-ye Bala Persian: كلاته بالا
- Village
- Location within Iran
- Coordinates: 32°20′36″N 60°30′35″E
- Country: Iran
- Province: South Khorasan
- County: Sarbisheh
- District: Doreh
- Rural District: Doreh

Population (2016)
  - Total: 215
- Time zone: UTC+3:30 (IRST)

Kalateh-ye Bala (Persian: كلاته بالا) (Note: Also romanized as Kalāteh-ye Bālā; also known as Kalāt-e Bālā (كلات بالا) and Kalateh Bala Tabas Masina) is a village in Doreh Rural District of Doreh District in Sarbisheh County, South Khorasan province, Iran.

== Demographics ==
=== Population ===
At the time of the 2006 National Census, the village's population was 228 in 63 households, when it was in the Central District. The following census in 2011 counted 279 people in 84 households. The 2016 census measured the population of the village as 215 people in 66 households, by which time the rural district had been separated from the district in the formation of Doreh District.
