= Marker =

The term Marker may refer to:

== Common uses ==
- Marker (linguistics), a morpheme that indicates some grammatical function
- Marker (telecommunications), a special-purpose computer
- Boundary marker, an object that identifies a land boundary
- Marker or Clapperboard, equipment used during filming
- Marker, a set of sewing patterns placed over cloth to be cut
- Historical marker, a plaque erected at historically significant locations
- Marker pen, a felt-tipped pen
- Paintball marker, or paintball gun, an air gun
- Survey marker, an object placed to mark a point

== Places ==
- 4253 Märker, a main belt asteroid
- Marker, Norway, a municipality in Østfold county, Norway

== People ==
- Chris Marker (1921–2012), French film maker and director of La jetée
- Cliff Marker (1903–1972), American football player
- Friedrich Märker (1893–1985), German writer, essayist, theatre critic and publicist
- Gary Marker, American bass guitarist and recording engineer
- Gus Marker (1905–1997), Canadian ice hockey player
- Harry Marker (1899 – 1990), American filmmaker
- James Marker (c. 1920–2012), American-born Canadian businessman who invented Cheezies
- Jamsheed Marker (born 1922), Pakistani diplomat
- Nicky Marker (born 1965), English footballer and coach
- Peter Marker, Australian Australian rules footballer and media personality
- Russell Earl Marker (1902–1995), American chemist
- Steve Marker (born 1959), American musician and record producer, guitarist for Garbage
- Vic Marker (fl. 1937–1939), American boxer
- Voris (designer), née Voris Marker (1908-1973), American fashion designer and sculptor

== Arts, entertainment, and media ==
- Marker (band), a band formed in 2017 by Ken Vandermark
- Marker (novel), a 2005 novel by Robin Cook
- Marker (TV series), a 1995 American drama series
- The Marker (film), a 2017 British crime film
- TheMarker, an Israeli Hebrew-language daily business newspaper
- Pistol Whipped (working title: Marker), a 2008 film starring Steven Seagal
- Marker, a character from the fourth season of Battle for Dream Island, an animated web series
- Marker, a business website published by Medium

== Companies ==
- Marker (ski bindings), a company specializing in ski bindings

== Science ==
- Biological marker, or biomarker, a substance used as an indicator of a biological state
- Genetic marker, a DNA sequence with a known location associated with a particular gene or trait

== See also ==
- Mark (disambiguation)
- Markup (disambiguation)
- Marker, Russian combat UGV
