= Balarishta =

Death of a child in Hindu astrology

Balarishta in Hindu astrology is one of the Arishtas. These Arishtas are indicated by certain specific planetary situations or combinations or associations present at the time of one's birth or at the time of query or at a particular muhurta or happening as are revealed by the Natal Chart or the Query Chart or the Muhurta Chart. It is a Dosha.

== Arishtas ==
The three kinds of Arishta that can strike a person at a very young age are – a) Balarishta or death before eight years, b) Madhyarishta or death before the age of twenty years and c) Yogarishta or death before thirty-two years.

Balarishta is the Sanskrit word that means infant mortality, but astrologically it actually indicates a Dosha, a misfortune more in terms of ill-health during infancy and childhood than of any other kind of adversity that can strike a person at that age. Therefore, it is an affliction in the Natal Chart or Query Chart, an ava-yoga (evil yoga), which need not necessarily indicate early death, for death occurs only if the planetary infliction is severe and there are no other yogas indicating a longer term of life counter – acting Balarishta Dosha. In Astrology the most difficult task is the determination of one's age i.e. span of life, time of death and Balarishta.

The ancient astrologers devoted a considerable thought on Balarishta because if the new-born is not destined to live long, astrological prognostications are of no avail. Since Balarishta is the result of one’s past karmas only when there are no evil influences causing Balarishta, the pandits advise, should the determination of probable life-span be taken up in right earnest. There are six types of Yogayus indicating death within one year, death within 12 years (Balarishta), death within 32 years (Alpayu), death within 70 years, death (Madhyayu), death within 100 years (Deerghayu) and death after 100 years (Amithayu).

== Early death ==
Early death occurs mainly when at the time of birth the Moon is weak, ill-placed and afflicted by malefic planets. Whereas the Moon situated in the 6th house from the Lagna (Ascendant) causes Balarishta, an affliction by either Mars or Saturn gives curious and incurable diseases and revengeful foes. However, when the Sun and the Moon are strong and free from affliction one enjoys good health even if the Lagna at the time of birth is unfavourably influenced through adverse planetary aspects and conjunctions. Mars in the 7th, Rahu in the 9th, Saturnin the Lagna, Jupiter in the 3rd and Venus in the 6th house are also taken as indicators of infant mortality; malefic planets situated in the 2nd, the 6th, the 8th or in the 12th house from the Lagna increase the chance of Balarishta. Parashara in his Brihat Parashara Hora Sastra Chapter IX has described six adverse situations indicating early death of the infant, Varahamihira in his Brihat Jataka Chapter VI has listed twelve and Janardan Harji in his Mansagari Chapter IV has listed eighty-four; all standard texts on Hindu predictive astrology have described various ava-yogas indicating early death. But, Balarishta ava-yogas if not resulting in early death indicate immense hardship during infancy or period of childhood. Even Lord Krishna suffered Balarishta till the age of 11 years in which age He had to face many a crisis mainly due to His maternal uncle, Kamsa.

According to Mansagari Rahu in the 7th from the Natal Moon proves adverse for father and mother, also the Moon if in conjunction with Ketu in the 4th house or in the 9th or the 10th spoils these bhavas, and according to Phaladeepika if the Sun is situated in the 9th house then one becomes deprived of happiness while still very young. A person born in Scorpio lagna with Saturn in the 2nd house, Rahu in the 3rd, Mars in the 6th, Venus in the 8th and The Moon, Mercury, Jupiter, and Ketu conjoining with the Sun in the 9th in Cancer sign, lost his father, who died of a motor-car accident, when he was a small child barely able to walk; this too is a kind of Balarishta.

== Balarishtabhanga ==
When there are seen ava-yogas indicating Balarishta there can also simultaneously occur auspicious yogas cancelling the adverse impact of the indicated Balarishta. Any one of the natural benefics – Mercury, Venus or Jupiter, strong and unafflicted or the strong lord of the Lagna situated in a kendra from the lagna cancels Balarishta. Parashara also states that if the 4th house is occupied by an evil planet and Jupiter is favourably placed or if Jupiter and Mars conjoin or Jupiter aspects Mars or if evil planets in the kendras are hemmed between benefic planets Balarishta yogas get cancelled. These are some of the favourable "Arishtabhanga yogas". A strong Moon and a strong Lagna-lord are potent protective factors but even a strong Moon cannot escape from the influences exerted by other planets upon the signs and bhava not occupied by the Moon. N.Chidambaram Aiyar, for instance, has given sixteen planetary situations centering on the role of the three strong natural benefics and the strong lord of the lagna, and the Moon, which situations if also simultaneously existing counteract the ill-effect of several Balarishta yogas given in the texts, there will be no early death etc.;. The texts have also described special yogas cancelling Balarishta. For example, if Saturn is in Leo, Jupiter in the 12th (in Virgo) and the navamsa of Aries is devoid of a malefic, one born in Nirmalamsa does not incur Chandra Dosha (blemished Moon to cause Balarishta) Sloka 859 of Chandra Kala Nadi Mahadeva in his Jataka Tattva states that the Moon, weak and lustreless, situated in a sign owned by Venus, causes Balarishta, and the child dies at the age of seven years. But rarely does the Full Moon in the 7th act as a powerful maraka unless there is a strong malefic also situated in the 8th house, early death cannot result if the planet in 8th is aspected by a benefic planet.

== Impact of Balarishta in Muhurta Charts ==
Muhurta Charts revealing Balarishta ava-yogas indicate that either the period when the benefits accruing from the work commenced will be very brief or the task begun will not meet successful culmination; their role is similar to that of the Marakas, planets endowed with death-afflicting power. Morarji Desai’s government collapsed because Saturn and Rahu afflicted the 10th house; Mars, in mutual aspect with Saturn afflicting Leo Lagna, transited the 10th house in the swearing-in chart, and the Moon occupied Uttarabhadrapada nakshatra ruled by the afflicted maraka-lord Saturn. In the case of Charan Singh who was sworn in as India's Prime Minister on 28 July 1979 the Moon in Poorvaphalguni nakshatra was severely afflicted by Saturn, Rahu and Mars thus causing a strong Balarishta yoga; he had to resign within one month.
