= Lanu =

Lanu may refer to:

== People ==
- Juha Lanu (born 1961), Finnish musician
- Olavi Lanu (1925–2015), Finnish sculptor

== Places ==
- Lanu, South Khorasan, Iran
- Lañu, Spain
