= Kobad =

Kobad may refer to:

- Kavadh I
- Kobad, Iran
- Kai Kobad
