= Darakht-e Tut =

Darakht-e Tut or Derakht-e Tut or Derakht Tut (Persian: درخت توت) may refer to:

- Derakht-e Tut, Razavi Khorasan
- Darakht-e Tut, South Khorasan
