= Doreh =

City in South Khorasan province, Iran

Doreh Persian: درح
- City
- Location within Iran
- Coordinates: 32°17′16″N 60°29′29″E
- Country: Iran
- Province: South Khorasan
- County: Sarbisheh
- District: Doreh
- Rural District: Doreh
- Established as a city: 2017

Population (2016)
  - Total: 2,431
- Time zone: UTC+3:30 (IRST)

Doreh (Persian: درح) (Note: Also romanized as Doroh and Doroḩ; also known as Dorūh and Durūh) is a city in, and the capital of, Doreh District in Sarbisheh County, South Khorasan province, Iran. It also serves as the administrative center for Doreh Rural District.

== Demographics ==
=== Population ===
At the time of the 2006 National Census, Doreh's population was 1,562 in 420 households, when it was a village in Doreh Rural District of the Central District. The following census in 2011 counted 2,117 people in 560 households. The 2016 census measured the population of the village as 2,431 people in 655 households, by which time the rural district had been separated from the district in the formation of Doreh District. Doreh was the most populous village in its rural district.

Doreh was converted to a city in 2017.
