= Gheynab Rural District =

Rural district in South Khorasan province, Iran

Gheynab Rural District Persian: دهستان غيناب
- Rural District
- Location within Iran
- Coordinates: 32°27′N 60°06′E
- Country: Iran
- Province: South Khorasan
- County: Sarbisheh
- District: Central
- Established: 2010
- Capital: Naz Dasht

Population (2016)
  - Total: 3,706
- Time zone: UTC+3:30 (IRST)

Gheynab Rural District (Persian: دهستان غيناب) is in the Central District of Sarbisheh County, South Khorasan province, Iran. Its capital is the village of Naz Dasht.

== History ==
Gheynab Rural District was created in the Central District in 2010.

== Demographics ==
=== Population ===
At the time of the 2016 National Census, the rural district's population was 3,706 in 985 households. The most populous of its 51 villages was Naz Dasht, with 990 people.

=== Other villages in the rural district ===
- Abbasabad
- Bahamarz
- Chah Khoshkan
- Chah Khu
- Chah Shahid Ashrafi Isfahani
- Cheshmeh Zangi
- Chestak-e Sofla
- Dehik
- Dugh-e Sar Bisheh
- Ebrahimabad
- Eskivang
- Golab-e Bala
- Golab-e Pain
- Golestan
- Gondakan
- Hasan Kolangi
- Hoseynabad-e Gheynab
- Jannatabad
- Kal-e Sorkh
- Kasrab
- Khar Miri
- Kun Rud Siahu
- Marufan
- Mohammadabad-e Kharkash
- Nargesk
- Pureng
- Qaleh Qonbar
- Qaleh Sorkh
- Taj Mir
