= Marked (disambiguation) =

Markedness is the state of being marked.

Marked may also refer to:

- Marked (TV series), a 2009 American television documentary series on tattoos
- Marked (novel), a 2007 fantasy novel in P.C. and Kristin Cast's House of Night series
- "Marked", a 2011 song by Erika M. Anderson
- Marked, a 2009–2010 romance novel series by Sylvia Day
- Zaznamovani (English: The Marked), a 1940 collection of short stories by Bogomir Magajna

== See also ==
- Marked bill
- Marked Men (disambiguation)
