= The Mark =

The Mark may refer to:

== Buildings ==
- The Mark (Bucharest), future class-A office building in Bucharest, Romania
- The Mark Hotel, in Manhattan, New York
- The Mark (San Diego), a building in San Diego, California
- The Mark (Sydney), a residential tower in Sydney, New South Wales, Australia
- Mark Hopkins Hotel, a hotel in San Francisco
- F5 Tower (formerly The Mark), an office-hotel skyscraper under construction in Seattle, Washington

== Popular culture ==
- Number of the beast (often referred to as the mark), a mysterious concept in the Book of Revelation
- The Mark (novel), a 2000 novel in the Left Behind series by Tim LaHaye
- The Mark (1961 film), a 1961 film directed by Guy Green
- The Mark (2012 film), a 2012 film directed by James Chankin
- "The Mark", a song by Black Light Burns
- Rohan (Middle-earth) (also referred to as the Mark), a fictional country in J.R.R. Tolkien's Middle-earth legendarium
- "The Mark", a campaign and web site by Grolsch

== See also ==
- Mark (disambiguation)
