= Mark =

Mark may refer to:

== Symbols ==
- Glyph, a purposeful mark in typography
- Mark (sign), written or imprinted symbol used to indicate some trait of an item, such as its ownership or maker
- Watermark, an identifying image in paper that is visible when viewed in transmitted light; or an identifier in digital contexts
- A mark used in lieu of a signature when the signatory is incapable of signing their name

== Christianity ==
- Gospel of Mark, one of the four canonical gospels and one of the three synoptic gospels
- Mark the Evangelist (5–68), traditionally ascribed author of the Gospel of Mark
- John Mark (died 1st century), assistant accompanying Paul and Barnabas in the Acts of the Apostles

== Currencies ==
- Mark (currency), a currency or unit of account in many nations
- Bosnia and Herzegovina convertible mark, the currency of Bosnia and Herzegovina
- East German mark, the currency of the German Democratic Republic
- Estonian mark, the currency of Estonia between 1918 and 1928
- Finnish markka (Swedish: finsk mark), the currency of Finland from 1860 until 28 February 2002
- Polish marka (Polish: marka polska), the currency of the Kingdom of Poland and of the Republic of Poland between 1917 and 1924

=== German ===
- Deutsche Mark, the official currency of West Germany from 1948 until 1990 and later the unified Germany from 1990 until 2002
- German gold mark, the currency used in the German Empire from 1873 to 1914
- Papiermark, the German currency from 4 August 1914
- Rentenmark, a currency issued on 15 November 1923 to stop the hyperinflation of 1922 and 1923 in Weimar Germany
- Łódź Ghetto mark, a special currency for Łódź Ghetto, 1940–1944
- Reichsmark, the currency in Germany from 1924 until 1945, then until 20 June 1948 in West Germany

== People ==
- Mark (given name), a male given name, includes a list of notable people with the name
- Mark (surname), includes a list of notable people with the name
- Mark of Cornwall (fl. early 6th century), king of Kernow
- Pope Mark (died 336), Pope of the Catholic Church from 18 January to 7 October 336
- Mark Lee (singer), Canadian rapper

== Places ==
=== Europe ===
- Amt Dahme/Mark a collective municipality in the district of Teltow-Fläming in Brandenburg, Germany
- Amt Lindow (Mark), a collective municipality in the district of Ostprignitz-Ruppin in Brandenburg, Germany
- Baruth/Mark, a town in the Teltow-Fläming district of Brandenburg, Germany
- County of Mark, a county and state of the Holy Roman Empire in the Lower Rhenish–Westphalian Circle
- Friesack/Mark, a town in the Havelland district in Brandenburg, Germany
- Mark (Dender), a river in Belgium
- Mark (Dintel), a river in Belgium and the Netherlands
- Mark Hundred, a Västergötland hundred in Sweden
- Mark Municipality, a municipality in Västra Götaland County in southwest Sweden
- Mark, Somerset, an English village and civil parish
- Mark Lane, a road in the City of London

=== Elsewhere ===
- Mereg (also Mark), a village in Sarkal Rural District, in the Central District of Marivan County, Kurdistan Province, Iran
- Mark, Illinois, a village in Putnam County, Illinois
- Mark, Missouri, an extinct town in Marion County, in the U.S. state of Missouri

== Sports ==
- Mark, a term used in professional wrestling with multiple meanings
- Mark (Australian rules football), where a player cleanly catches a kicked ball that has travelled more than 15 metres without anyone else touching it
- Mark (rugby), a play in which a player may catch the ball and take a free-kick at the position of the mark

== Other ==
- <mark>...</mark>, an HTML element used for highlighting relevant text in a quotation
- March (territory) (also mark), a medieval European term for any kind of borderland
- Mark (designation), a method of designating a version of a product (often abbreviated "Mk" or "M")
- Mark (dinghy), a single-hander class of small sailing dinghy
- Mark (unit), a medieval European weight or mass unit that supplanted the pound weight as a precious metals and coinage weight from the 11th century
- USS Mark (AG-143), a vessel of the US Army and the US and Taiwanese navies
- Mark and space, terms used in telecommunications to describe two different signal states of a signal
- High water mark, a line that represents the maximum rise of a body of water over land
- Mark (2009 film), a Canadian documentary film
- Mark (2025 film), an Indian Kannada-language action drama film
- Mark, the victim of a confidence trick
- Milwaukee Area–Racine–Kenosha (MARK) Rail, a proposed passenger rail service

== See also ==
- Marked (disambiguation)
- Marc (disambiguation)
- The Mark (disambiguation)
- Marker (disambiguation)
- Marking (disambiguation)
- Marks (disambiguation)
- Marque (disambiguation)
- St. Mark's (disambiguation)
- Marka (disambiguation)
- Marak (disambiguation)
- Maraka (disambiguation)
