= Marq =

Marq or MARQ may refer to:

== People ==
=== Given name ===
- Marq Cerqua (born 1977), American former National Football League player
- Marq Mellor (born 1968), American field hockey player
- Marq Porciuncula (born 1987), German singer and songwriter
- Marq Quen (born 1994), half of Private Party, a professional wrestling tag team
- G. Marq Roswell, American tech entrepreneur, music supervisor and film producer
- Marq Torien (born 1962), American singer, lead singer of the band BulletBoys
- Marq de Villiers (born 1940), South African-born Canadian writer

=== Nickname ===
- Marquette Hawkins, former member of the hip-hop group World Class Wreckin' Cru and first African-American mayor of California City, California

== Other uses ==
- Marq Dyeth, a character in the 1984 novel Stars in My Pocket Like Grains of Sand by Samuel R. Delany
- Marq (company), a cloud-based software developer
- Archaeological Museum of Alicante, Spain (Spanish: Museu Arqueològic Provincial d'Alacant, abbreviated MARQ)
- The Marq, an apartment complex/residence hall owned by Marquette University and located on its campus

== See also ==
- Mark (disambiguation)
- Marque (disambiguation)
