= Sarbisheh =

City in South Khorasan province, Iran

Sarbisheh Persian: سربيشه
- City
- Location within Iran
- Coordinates: 32°34′39″N 59°47′46″E
- Country: Iran
- Province: South Khorasan
- County: Sarbisheh
- District: Central

Population (2016)
  - Total: 8,715
- Time zone: UTC+3:30 (IRST)

Sarbisheh (Persian: سربيشه) (Note: Also romanized as Sarbīsheh; also known as Sar-bice) is a city in the Central District of Sarbisheh County, South Khorasan province, Iran, serving as capital of both the county and the district.

== Demographics ==
=== Population ===
At the time of the 2006 National Census, the city's population was 6,141 in 1,553 households. The following census in 2011 counted 8,203 people in 2,053 households. The 2016 census measured the population of the city as 8,715 people in 2,362 households.
