= Marc =

Marc or MARC may refer to:

== People ==
- Marc (given name), people with the first name
- Marc (surname), people with the family name

== Acronyms ==
- MARC standards, a data format used for library cataloging
- MARC Train, a regional commuter rail system serving Maryland, Washington, D.C., and eastern West Virginia
- MARC (archive), a computer-related mailing list archive
- M/A/R/C Research, a marketing research and consulting firm
- Massachusetts Animal Rights Coalition, a non-profit, volunteer organization
- Matador Automatic Radar Control, a guidance system for the Martin MGM-1 Matador cruise missile
- Mid-America Regional Council, the Council of Governments and the Metropolitan Planning Organization for the bistate Kansas City region
- Midwest Association for Race Cars, a former American stock car racing organization
- Revolutionary Agrarian Movement of the Bolivian Peasantry (Movimiento Agrario Revolucionario del Campesinado Boliviano), a defunct right-wing political movement
- Mid-Atlantic Rowing Conference, a college rowing conference.

== Other uses ==
- Marc is the French word for pomace, fruit solids as used for making pomace brandy
- Marz, Austria, aka Márc, a town
- Marc (cycling team), a Belgian road-racing team 1978–1980
- Marc (TV series), a pop music television show presented by Marc Bolan
- MSC Marc, a finite element analysis software
- MARC Cars Australia, an Australian motor racing team and manufacturer
- Various related obsolete units of weight - see Apothecaries' system

== See also ==
- Marc's, a drugstore chain in Ohio, United States
- Marc Marc, Saint Lucia, a city
- Mark (disambiguation)
- Marcus (disambiguation)
- Month of March
