= Michal Mařík =

Czech ice hockey player

- Born: May 18, 1975 (age 51) Tábor, Czechoslovakia
- Height: 6 ft 2 in (188 cm)
- Weight: 201 lb (91 kg; 14 st 5 lb)
- Position: Goaltender
- Caught: Left
- Played for: HC Plzeň; HC Karlovy Vary; Motor České Budějovice; HC Zlín; HC Oceláři Třinec; HC Havířov Panthers; HC Litvínov; HC Vítkovice; Stjernen Hockey
- Playing career: 1993–2011

Michal Mařík (born May 18, 1975) is a Czech former professional ice hockey goaltender.

Mařík played a total of 312 games in the Czech Extraliga over 12 seasons from 1993 to 2005. He played for HC Plzeň, HC Karlovy Vary, Motor České Budějovice, HC Zlín, HC Oceláři Třinec, HC Havířov Panthers, HC Litvínov and HC Vítkovice. He also played in the GET-ligaen for Stjernen Hockey.

Mařík played in the 1995 World Junior Ice Hockey Championships for the Czech Republic.
