= M/A/R/C Research =

American marketing research and consulting firm

- Formerly: Marketing and Research Counselors
- Industry: Marketing research
- Founded: 1965; 61 years ago
- Founder: Cecil "Bud" Phillips
- Headquarters: Irving, Texas, USA
- Number of locations: 6
- Owner: Merrill Dubrow (since 2018)
- Number of employees: 70

M/A/R/C Research is an American marketing research and consulting firm. M/A/R/C designs and conducts custom qualitative and quantitative, traditional and online surveys. Mainly, the firm is known for measuring attitudes and behaviors to accurately explain and predict market share, revenue and bottom-line impact of a client's actions.

== History ==
M/A/R/C was founded in 1965 by Cecil "Bud" Phillips who had previously led the research team at TracyLocke in Dallas. Originally called Marketing and Research Counselors, the company name was later shortened to M/A/R/C Research.

In November 1999, M/A/R/C was acquired by Omnicom Group Inc., a marketing and corporate communications company. In 2018, CEO Merrill Dubrow finalized the purchase of M/A/R/C Research from Omnicom.

== Quick Facts ==
- Founded—1965
- Employees—70
- Headquarters—Irving, Texas
- Additional offices -- Greensboro, St. Louis, Chicago, Philadelphia, New York
- CEO—Merrill Dubrow
- Industry—Market Research
