= Maraq, Azerbaijan =

Maraq
- Location within Azerbaijan
- Coordinates: 40°38′52″N 46°07′46″E
- Country: Azerbaijan
- Rayon: Goygol
- Time zone: UTC+4 (AZT)
  - Summer (DST): UTC+5 (AZT)

Maraq (also, Mairik and Marak) is a village in the Goygol Rayon of Azerbaijan.
