= Qaleh-ye Qanbar =

Qaleh-ye Qanbar قلعه قنبر
- Village
- Location within Iran
- Coordinates: 33°36′20″N 48°40′15″E
- Country: Iran
- Province: Lorestan
- County: Khorramabad
- Bakhsh: Bayravand
- Rural District: Beyranvand-e Jonubi

Population (2006)
  - Total: 26
- Time zone: UTC+3:30 (IRST)
  - Summer (DST): UTC+4:30 (IRDT)

Qaleh-ye Qanbar (Persian: قلعه قنبر, also Romanized as Qal‘eh-ye Qanbar and Qal‘eh Qanbar) is a village in Beyranvand-e Jonubi Rural District, Bayravand District, Khorramabad County, Lorestan Province, Iran. At the 2006 census, its population was 26, in 6 families.
