= Marked Men =

Marked Men can refer to:

- Marked Men (1919 film), an American Western film directed by John Ford
- Marked Men (1940 film), an American crime film
- Marked Men: Rule + Shaw (2025 film), an American romantic drama film
- The Marked Men, an American band
  - The Marked Men (album), an album by the above band

== See also ==
- A Marked Man, a 1917 American silent film
