= Cheshmeh Zangi, Kermanshah =

Cheshmeh Zangi چشمه زنگي کانی زه نگی
- Village
- Location within Iran
- Coordinates: 34°51′44″N 47°07′42″E
- Country: Iran
- Province: Kermanshah
- County: Sonqor
- Bakhsh: Kolyai
- Rural District: Kivanat

Population (2006)
  - Total: 124
- Time zone: UTC+3:30 (IRST)
  - Summer (DST): UTC+4:30 (IRDT)

Cheshmeh Zangi (Persian: چشمه زنگي, also Romanized as Cheshmeh Zangī or Kani Zanği) is a village in Kivanat Rural District, Kolyai District, Sonqor County, Kermanshah Province, Iran. At the 2006 census, its population was 124, in 28 families.
