= Mahrik =

Maryak Maryak
- Village
- Location within Iran
- Coordinates: 31°57′28″N 50°41′25″E
- Country: Iran
- Province: Chaharmahal and Bakhtiari
- County: Kiar
- Bakhsh: Naghan
- Rural District: Naghan

Population (2006)
  - Total: 23
- Time zone: UTC+3:30 (IRST)
  - Summer (DST): UTC+4:30 (IRDT)

Maryak (Persian: Maryak, also Romanized as Mahrīk) is a village in Naghan Rural District, Naghan District, Kiar County, Chaharmahal and Bakhtiari Province, Iran. At the 2006 census, its population was 23, in 5 families. The village is populated by Lurs.
