= Maraq, Markazi =

Maraq مرق
- Village
- Location within Iran
- Coordinates: 34°57′15″N 49°57′27″E
- Country: Iran
- Province: Markazi
- County: Saveh
- Bakhsh: Central
- Rural District: Nur Ali Beyk

Population (2006)
  - Total: 237
- Time zone: UTC+3:30 (IRST)
  - Summer (DST): UTC+4:30 (IRDT)

Maraq (Persian: مرق, also Romanized as Marq and Marraq; also known as Margh and Marrah) is a village of the Nur Ali Beyk Rural District; Central District of Saveh County, Markazi Province, Iran. According to the 2006 census, its population was 237 inhabitants, living in 80 families.
