= George M. Marakas =

American scholar and research scientist

- Born: March 23, 1953 (age 72); Harvey, IL
- Education: B.A., Liberal Arts, Governors State University, Masters in Business Administration, Colorado State University, PhD in Information Systems, Florida International University
- Occupation(s): Author, research scientist, professor, educator, consultant, entrepreneur, Chairman at K and G Cycles, LLC, and CEO at Little Angel

George M. Marakas is an American author, scholar, research scientist, professor, consultant, entrepreneur, and an authority in specific areas within the field of information systems. He has been named a Distinguished Member - Cum Laude by the Association for Information Systems. His academic career, includes faculty appointments at the Robert H. Smith School of Business at University of Maryland where he was a Center for Teaching Excellence Eli Lilly Fellow, the Kelley School of Business at Indiana University where he held the British-American Tobacco Fellowship for Global Information Systems Strategy., the University of Kansas School of Business, and the Florida International University College of Business where he holds the rank of Full professor and is the Associate Dean for Research and Doctoral Studies for the FIU College of Business.

Dr. Marakas received his Ph.D. in Information Systems from Florida International University in 1995, his MBA from Colorado State University, and his bachelor's degree from Governor's State University. Before his position at FIU, he was a faculty member at University of Maryland and a tenured senior faculty member at the University of Kansas and the Kelley School of Business at Indiana University. He also served as an adjunct faculty member at the Helsinki School of Economics.

Preceding his academic career, he enjoyed a highly successful banking and real estate career. His corporate experience includes senior management positions with Continental Illinois National Bank and the Federal Deposit Insurance Corporation. In addition, George served as the first President and CEO for CMC Group, Inc., a major real estate development firm in Miami, FL, for three years.

Marakas has co-authored and published more than 50 scholarly papers and five textbooks within the field of information systems. He writes, speaks and researches in the area of computer and technological self-efficacy from both a theoretical and applied perspective. He is also considered an expert on doctoral education and doctoral program management. Marakas has served as a Senior Editor for THE Database for Information Systems Research and an Associate Editor for Information Systems Research.

Marakas holds senior executive positions in several entrepreneurial ventures in the motorcycle and olive oil industries. His writing has appeared in several motorcycle publications in both print and digital form and he is a regular contributor to blogs in both industries.

== Selected publications ==
- Aguirre-Urreta, M., Ronkko, M., and Marakas, G. (2023) “Reconsidering the Implications of Formative vs. Reflective Measurement Model Misspecification,” Information Systems Journal, in press.
- Lopez, A.M. and Marakas, G.M. (2023) “Public-Private Partnership (P3) Success: Critical Success Factors for Local Government Services and Infrastructure Delivery”, Engaged Management Review, 6:1.
- Marakas, G.M., Aguirre-Urreta, M., Shoja, A., Kim, E, and Wang, S. (2023) “The Computer Self-Efficacy Construct: A History of Application in Information Systems Research,” Foundations and Trends® in Information Systems: Vol. 6, No. 2, pp 94–170. DOI: 10.1561/2900000023.
- Lee, KJ, Choi, J., Marakas, G.M., Singh, S. (2018) "Two Distinct Routes for Inducing Emotions in HCI Design: Achieving Delight versus Avoiding Hatred. International Journal of Human-Computer Studies, 124, 67-80.
- Cousins, K., Zadeh, P.E., Marakas, G.M., Klein, R. (2018) “Frictionless Commerce,” Cutter Business Technology Journal, 31:5.
- Ellis, M., Aguirre-Urreta, M., Lee, K., Sun, W. Liu, Y., Mao, J, & Marakas, G.M. (2016) “Categorization of technologies: insights from the technology acceptance literature,” Journal of Applied Business and Economics, 18:4.
- Aguirre-Urreta, M., Marakas, G., and Ronkko, M. “Omission of Causal Indicators: Consequences and Implications for Measurement,”

Measurement: Interdisciplinary Research and Perspectives, 14:3, 75–97.

- Aguirre-Urreta, M., Marakas, G., and Ronkko, M. “Omission of Causal Indicators: Consequences and Implications for Measurement – A Rejoinder,” Measurement: Interdisciplinary Research and Perspectives, 14:4, 170–175.
- Sun, W, Aguirre-Urreta, M. and Marakas, G., (2016). “Effectiveness of Pair Programming: Perceptions of Software Professionals,”

IEEE Software, 33, 72–79.

- Aguirre-Urreta, M. and Marakas, G., (2014). "Research Commentary: A Rejoinder to Rigdon, et al. (2014),” Information Systems Research, 25:4, 785–788.
- Aguirre-Urreta, M. and Marakas, G., (2014). “PLS and Models with Formatively-Specified Endogenous Constructs: A Cautionary Note,” Information Systems Research, 25:4, 761–778.
- Aguirre-Urreta, M., Marakas, G.M., and Ellis, M. (2013). “Measurement of Composite Reliability in Research: Using Partial Least Squares Research: Some Issues and an Alternative Approach,” The DATA BASE for Advances in Information Systems, 44:4, pp. 11–43.
- Aguirre-Urreta, M. and Marakas, G., (2012). “Revisiting Bias Due To Construct Misspecification: Different Results From Considering Coefficients In Standardized Form,” MIS Quarterly, 36:1, 123–138.
- Aguirre-Urreta, M. and Marakas, G.M., (2012). “Exploring Choice as an Antecedent to Behavior: Incorporating Alternatives into the Technology Acceptance Process,” Journal of Organizational and End User Computing, 24:1, 82–107.
- Aguirre-Urreta, M. and Marakas, G., (2010). “Is it Really Gender?: An Empirical Investigation into the Moderating Gender Variable in Technology Adoption,” Human Technology: An Interdisciplinary Journal on Humans in ICT Environments, 6:2, 155–190.
- Lowry, P.B., Dean, D.L., Roberts, T. & Marakas, G.M., (2009). “Toward building self-sustaining groups in PCR-based tasks through implicit coordination: The case of heuristic evaluation,” Journal of the Association for Information Systems, 10:3, 170–195.
- Marakas, G.M., Johnson, R.D., & Clay, P., (2009). “Formative versus Reflective Measurement: A Reply to Hardin, Chang, and Fuller,” Journal of the Association for Information Systems, 9:9.
- Aguirre-Urreta, M. & Marakas, G.M. (2008). “Comparing Conceptual Modeling Techniques: A Critical Review of the EER vs. OO Empirical Literature,” The Database for Advances in Information Systems, 39 (2), 9–32.
- Marakas, G.M., Johnson, R.D., & Clay, P., (2007). “The Evolving Nature Of the Computer Self-Efficacy Construct: An Empirical Investigation of Measurement, Construction, Reliability, and Stability Over Time,” Journal of the Association for Information Systems, 8:1.
- Wu. J.T. and Marakas, G.M., (2006). "The Impact of Non-leader User Participation to Perceived System Success in Stages of the System Development Life Cycle," Journal of Computer Information Systems, 46:5, 127–140.
- Johnson, R.D., Marakas, G.M., & Palmer, J. “Beliefs about the social roles and capabilities of computing technology: Development of the computing technology continuum of perspective.” Behaviour and Information Technology, in press, 2007.
- Johnson, R.D., Marakas, G.M., & Palmer, J. (2006) “Differential Social Attributions Toward Computing Technology: An Empirical Investigation” International Journal of Human Computer Studies, 64:5, 446–460.
- Sabherwal, R., Sein, M.K. and Marakas, G.M. (2003) “Escalating commitment to information systems projects: Findings from two simulated experiments,” Information and Management, 40, 781–798.
- Alavi, M., Marakas, G.M., & Yoo, Y. (2002) "A comparative study of technology-supported distributed learning environments on cognitive and perceived learning outcomes," Information Systems Research, Dec. 404–415.
- Wheeler, B.C., Marakas, G.M., & Brickley, P. (2002) “Taking IT From the backoffice to the boardroom: Educating the line to lead at British-American Tobacco.” MISQ Executive, 1:1, 47–62.
- Johnson, R.D., and Marakas, G.M. (2000)"The role of behavioral modeling in computer skills acquisition: Toward refinement of the model," Information Systems Research, Dec., 402–417.
- Marakas, G.M., Johnson, R.D., & Palmer, J. (2000) "A theoretical model of differential social attributions toward computing technology: When the metaphor becomes the model," International Journal of Human-Computer Studies, 52:4, 719–750.
- Wheeler, B.C. and Marakas, G.M. (1999) “Facts, faith, or fear: Making the business case for IT investments,” Two teaching cases and a teaching note. IS World Case Repository
- Marakas, G.M., Yi, M.Y., and Johnson, R.,(1998) “The multilevel and multifaceted character of computer self-efficacy: Toward a clarification of the construct and an integrative framework for research, Information Systems Research, June 1998.
- Marakas, G.M. and Elam, J.J., (1998) “The impact of semantic structuring on the representation of facts: With implications for improving analysts’ interview behavior,” Information Systems Research, March 1998.
- Marakas, G.M. and Elam, J.J., (1997) “Creativity enhancement in problem-solving: Through software or process?” Management Science, August.
- Marakas, G.M. and Hornik, S.,(1996) “Passive resistance misuse: Overt support and covert resistance in IS implementation,” European Journal of Information Systems, May.
- Batra, D. and Marakas, G.M., (1995) “Conceptual data modeling in theory and practice,” European Journal of Information Systems, August.
