= Markas =

Markas is a male Lithuanian given name that is derived from Marcus.

Its derivations are Markauskas and Markevičius (family name).

== People ==
- Markas Beneta (born 1993), footballer
- Markas Luckis (1905–1973), Argentine chess player of Lithuanian descent
- Markas Šilkūnas (born 2009), Lithuanian racing driver
- Bronius Markauskas (born 1960), politician, member of Seimas
- Raimundas Markauskas (born 1966), liberal politician, engineer, member of Seimas
- Rimantas Markauskas (born 1954), politician, member of Seimas
- Gvidonas Markevičius (born 1969), basketball player and coach
- Vytautas Markevičius (born 1962), lawyer, politician, and former Interior Minister of Lithuania (2001–2004)
- Rory Markas (1955–2010), American sportscaster
