= Mark (dinghy) =

Sailing dinghy made in Belfast in the 1960s

Development
- Year: 1960s
- Name: Mark

Boat
- Crew: 1

Hull
- Hull weight: 130 lb (59 kg)
- LOA: 12 ft (3.7 m)

Rig
- Mast height: 19 ft (5.8 m)

The Mark is a single-hander small sailing dinghy. The design in plywood came from the pen of Billy Morton from Morton's Yacht Supplies, Priory Road, Hollywood, Belfast Northern Ireland. It first appeared in the 1964, in competition with the OK dinghy but before the Laser. At least 100 boats were built by Morton. Her performance is slower than an OK upwind due to her lighter weight (130lbs.) and shorter length. The Mark is 12 feet (3.7 m) in length, with forward and side buoyancy compartments. A 19 feet (5.8 m) free-standing rotating mast stepped far forward in the front buoyancy compartment supports a mainsail which features a MK symbol to identify the boat. In 1966 the fibreglass Mark was introduced with no.100 called 'Fymark.'

No class racing is active.

Strong efforts were made to expand sales to the Republic of Ireland by making her available to potential buyers at Broadmeadow Estuary in Malahide. This did not succeed.

The Mark did not succeed for a number of reasons:

- Poor upwind performance
- She was not available for home building
- She never reached sustainable numbers in any location
- She was not a pretty boat
- The only builder was in Northern Ireland
