= Elstone D Marak =

Indian politician

Elstone D Marak is an Indian politician from Meghalaya. He is a member of the Nationalist Congress Party.

In 2003, he was elected from East Garo Hills district's Kharkutta Assembly constituency, of Meghalaya.
