= Kalateh-ye Bala, Qaen =

Kalatah Bala كلاته بالا
- village
- Location within Iran
- Coordinates: 33°29′00″N 59°17′56″E
- Country: Iran
- Province: South Khorasan
- County: Qaen
- Bakhsh: Central
- Rural District: Qaen

Population (2006)
  - Total: 921
- Time zone: UTC+3:30 (IRST)
  - Summer (DST): UTC+4:30 (IRDT)

Kalatah Bala (Persian: كلاته بالا, also Romanized as Kalātah Bālā, Kalātah Bala, and Kalātah-Bāla) is a village in Qaen Rural District, in the Central District of Qaen County, South Khorasan Province, Iran. At the 2006 census, its population was 921, in 269 families.
