= Zbyněk Mařák =

Czech ice hockey player

- Born: August 12, 1971 (age 54) Zlín, Czechoslovakia
- Height: 5 ft 10 in (178 cm)
- Weight: 176 lb (80 kg; 12 st 8 lb)
- Position: Right wing
- Shot: Left
- Played for: HC Zlín; HC Vsetín; HC Slezan Opava; HC Znojenmští Orli; HK 36 Skalica; HC Dinamo Minsk
- National team: Czech Republic
- Playing career: 1989–2014

Zbyněk Mařák (born August 12, 1971) is a Czech former professional ice hockey right winger.

Mařák played in the Czech Extraliga for HC Vsetín, HC Slezan Opava, HC Zlín and HC Znojenmští Orli. He also played in the Slovak Extraliga for HK 36 Skalica and the Belarusian Extraleague for HC Dinamo Minsk.

Mařák is presently working as head coach of PSG Berani Zlín's U20 academy,
