= Mesgaran, Tus =

Mesgaran مسگران
- Village
- Location within Iran
- Coordinates: 36°27′27″N 59°32′51″E
- Country: Iran
- Province: Razavi Khorasan
- County: Mashhad
- Bakhsh: Central
- Rural District: Tus

Population (2006)
  - Total: 26
- Time zone: UTC+3:30 (IRST)
  - Summer (DST): UTC+4:30 (IRDT)

Mesgaran (Persian: مسگران, also Romanized as Mesgarān) is a village in Tus Rural District, in the Central District of Mashhad County, Razavi Khorasan Province, Iran. At the 2006 census, its population was 26, in 6 families.
