= Markup =

Markup or mark-up can refer to:

- Markup language, a systematic way of annotating a document with processing information
- Markup (business), difference between selling price and marginal cost
- Markup (legislation), a process for changing laws in the U.S.
- The Markup, American nonprofit news publication
