= Fakhr ol Din, North Khorasan =

Fakhr ol Din فخرالدين
- Village
- Location within Iran
- Coordinates: 37°36′31″N 57°08′51″E
- Country: Iran
- Province: North Khorasan
- County: Bojnord
- Bakhsh: Central
- Rural District: Badranlu

Population (2006)
  - Total: 822
- Time zone: UTC+3:30 (IRST)
  - Summer (DST): UTC+4:30 (IRDT)

Fakhr ol Din (Persian: فخرالدين, also Romanized as Fakhr ol Dīn and Fakhr od Dīn; also known as Fakhred Dīn) is a village in Badranlu Rural District, in the Central District of Bojnord County, North Khorasan Province, Iran. At the 2006 census, its population was 822, in 175 families.
