= Maraka (Hindu astrology) =

Misfortune-causing planets in Hindu astrology

Maraka (Sanskrit: मारक) in Hindu astrology refers to the planet or planets that cause death at the end of a particular life-span; if the assessed life-span is not over they cause accident, ill-health, poverty and misery during the course of their dasha or antra-dasha or in the period of the planet associating/influenced by them.
