= Doreh Rural District =

Rural district in South Khorasan province, Iran

Doreh Rural District Persian: دهستان درح
- Rural District
- Location within Iran
- Coordinates: 32°20′N 60°27′E
- Country: Iran
- Province: South Khorasan
- County: Sarbisheh
- District: Doreh
- Established: 1987
- Capital: Doreh

Population (2016)
  - Total: 6,975
- Time zone: UTC+3:30 (IRST)

Doreh Rural District (Persian: دهستان درح) is in Doreh District of Sarbisheh County, South Khorasan province, Iran. It is administered from the city of Doreh.

== Demographics ==
=== Population ===
At the time of the 2006 National Census, the rural district's population (as a part of the Central District) was 9,650 in 2,457 households. There were 10,007 inhabitants in 2,634 households at the following census of 2011. The 2016 census measured the population of the rural district as 6,975 in 1,790 households, by which time it had been separated from the district in the formation of Doreh District. The most populous of its 56 villages was Doreh (now a city), with 2,431 people.

=== Other villages in the rural district ===
- Bagh-e Sangi
- Chah Pensar
- Damdameh
- Fakhr ol Din
- Kabad
- Kafaz
- Kalateh-ye Bala
- Kalateh-ye Baluch
- Kanif
- Khakak
- Kharestan
- Lojunk-e Sofla
- Mahirud
- Makhunik
- Mish-e Now
- Saffal Band
- Sulabast
- Tighanab-e Bala
- Tutak
