= Momenabad Rural District (Sarbisheh County) =

Rural district in South Khorasan province, Iran

Momenabad Rural District Persian: دهستان مؤمن‌آباد
- Rural District
- Location within Iran
- Coordinates: 32°32′N 59°48′E
- Country: Iran
- Province: South Khorasan
- County: Sarbisheh
- District: Central
- Established: 1987
- Capital: Salmabad

Population (2016)
  - Total: 5,334
- Time zone: UTC+3:30 (IRST)

Momenabad Rural District (Persian: دهستان مؤمن‌آباد) is in the Central District of Sarbisheh County, South Khorasan province, Iran. Its capital is the village of Salmabad.

== Demographics ==
=== Population ===
At the time of the 2006 National Census, the rural district's population was 9,997 in 2,592 households. There were 9,197 inhabitants in 2,652 households at the following census of 2011. The 2016 census measured the population of the rural district as 5,334 in 1,692 households. The most populous of its 87 villages was Salmabad, with 751 people.

=== Other villages in the rural district ===
- Aliabad
- Aminabad Agriculture Complex
- Gazdez
- Hojjatabad
- Shirg-e Aqa
- Zulesk
