= Doreh District =

District in South Khorasan province, Iran

Doreh District Persian: بخش درح
- District
- Location within Iran
- Coordinates: 32°21′N 60°34′E
- Country: Iran
- Province: South Khorasan
- County: Sarbisheh
- Established: 2010
- Capital: Doreh

Population (2016)
  - Total: 11,167
- Time zone: UTC+3:30 (IRST)

Doreh District (Persian: بخش درح) is in Sarbisheh County, South Khorasan province, Iran. Its capital is the city of Doreh.

== History ==
In 2010, Doreh Rural District was separated from the Central District in the formation of Doreh District. The village of Doreh was converted to a city in 2017.

== Demographics ==
=== Population ===
At the time of the 2016 National Census, the district's population was 11,167 inhabitants in 3,027 households.

=== Administrative divisions ===
Doreh District Population
Administrative Divisions	2016
Doreh RD	6,975
Lanu RD	4,192
Doreh (city) (Note: Became a city after the 2016 census)	
Total	11,167
RD = Rural District
