= Sarbisheh County =

County in South Khorasan province, Iran

Sarbisheh County Persian: شهرستان سربیشه
- County
- Location of Sarbisheh County in South Khorasan province (right, purple)

- Location of South Khorasan province in Iran
- Coordinates: 32°29′N 60°03′E
- Country: Iran
- Province: South Khorasan
- Established: 2003
- Capital: Sarbisheh
- Districts: Central, Doreh, Mud

Population (2016)
  - Total: 40,959
- Time zone: UTC+3:30 (IRST)

Sarbisheh County (Persian: شهرستان سربیشه) is in South Khorasan province, Iran. Its capital is the city of Sarbisheh.

== History ==
In 2010, Gheynab Rural District was created in the Central District, and Doreh Rural District was separated from it in the formation of Doreh District, including the new Lanu Rural District. The village of Doreh was converted to a city in 2017.

== Demographics ==
=== Population ===
At the time of the 2006 census, the county's population was 37,591 in 10,119 households. The following census in 2011 counted 39,487 people in 11,164 households. The 2016 census measured the population of the county as 40,959 in 12,011 households.

=== Administrative divisions ===
Sarbisheh County's population history and administrative structure over three consecutive censuses are shown in the following table.

Sarbisheh County Population
Administrative Divisions	2006	2011	2016
Central District	25,788	27,407	17,755
Doreh RD	9,650	10,007	
Gheynab RD			3,706
Momenabad RD	9,997	9,197	5,334
Sarbisheh (city)	6,141	8,203	8,715
Doreh District			11,167
Doreh RD			6,975
Lanu RD			4,192
Doreh (city) (Note: Became a city after the 2016 census)			
Mud District	11,803	12,080	12,037
Mud RD	4,403	4,238	4,180
Naharjan RD	4,949	4,775	4,380
Mud (city)	2,451	3,067	3,477
Total	37,591	39,487	40,959
RD = Rural District

== Geography ==
Sarbisheh is Persian for "forest gate," and contains the last remaining dry forests of southern Khorasan in its surrounding mountains.

== See also ==
Media related to Sarbisheh County at Wikimedia Commons
