= Central District (Sarbisheh County) =

District in South Khorasan province, Iran

Central District (Sarbisheh County) Persian: بخش مرکزی شهرستان سربیشه
- District
- Location within Iran
- Coordinates: 32°30′N 59°55′E
- Country: Iran
- Province: South Khorasan
- County: Sarbisheh
- Established: 2003
- Capital: Sarbisheh

Population (2016)
  - Total: 17,755
- Time zone: UTC+3:30 (IRST)

The Central District of Sarbisheh County (Persian: بخش مرکزی شهرستان سربیشه) is in South Khorasan province, Iran. Its capital is the city of Sarbisheh.

== History ==
In 2010, Gheynab Rural District was created in the district, and Doreh Rural District was separated from it in the formation of Doreh District.

== Demographics ==
=== Population ===
At the time of the 2006 National Census, the district's population was 25,788 in 6,602 households. The following census in 2011 counted 27,407 people in 7,339 households. The 2016 census measured the population of the district as 17,755 inhabitants in 5,039 households.

=== Administrative divisions ===
Central District (Sarbisheh County) Population
Administrative Divisions	2006	2011	2016
Doreh RD (Note: Transferred to Doreh District)	9,650	10,007	
Gheynab RD			3,706
Momenabad RD	9,997	9,197	5,334
Sarbisheh (city)	6,141	8,203	8,715
Total	25,788	27,407	17,755
RD = Rural District
