= Marco =

Marco may refer to:

== People ==
=== Given name ===
- Marco (actor) (born 1977), South Korean model and actor

=== Surname ===
- Georg Marco (1863–1923), Romanian chess player of German origin
- Jindřich Marco (1921–2000), Czechoslovak photographer and numismatist
- Joseph Marco (born 1988), Filipino actor
- Kenny Marco (1947–2025), Canadian guitarist.
- María del Pilar Sinués y Navarro de Marco (1835–1893), Spanish writer
- Tomás Marco (born 1942), Spanish composer and writer on music

== Places ==
- Marco, Ceará, Brazil, a municipality
- Marco, New Zealand, a locality in the Taranaki Region
- Marco, Indiana, United States, an unincorporated town
- Marco, Missouri, United States, an unincorporated community
- Marco Island, Florida, United States, a city and an island

== Science and technology ==
- Mars Cube One (MarCO), a pair of small satellites which fly by Mars in 2018
- MARCO, a macrophage receptor protein that in humans is encoded by the MARCO gene
- Mid-Atlantic Regional Council on the Ocean (MARCO)
- Marco, the official window manager of MATE
- Maia and Marco, one of an artificial intelligence sportscaster pair

== Arts and entertainment ==
- Marco (1973 film), an American adventure film directed by Seymour Robbie
- Marco (2024 film), an Indian Malayalam language film directed by Haneef Adeni
- Marco: 3000 Leagues in Search of Mother, a 1999 Japanese anime film
- Marco, the Invented Truth, a 2024 Spanish biographical drama film
- Marco (comics), a fictional character in the DC Comics universe
- Marco Pagot, the main protagonist in Porco Rosso
- Marco (Animorphs), one of the six main characters in the book series Animorphs
- Marco, a character in the animated family comedy film Chibi Maruko-chan: A Boy from Italy
- "Marco" (Better Call Saul), an episode of Better Call Saul
- Marco (Marco Borsato album), 1994
- Marco (Marco Antonio Solís album), 1997
- Museo de Arte Contemporáneo de Monterrey (MARCO), the Museum of Contemporary Art in Monterrey, Mexico

== Other uses ==
- F.C. Marco, a former football club from Marco de Canaveses, Portugal
- List of storms named Marco

== See also ==
- Marc'O (1927–2025), French writer, researcher, director, playwright and filmmaker
- Marko (disambiguation)
- Marcos
- Macro (disambiguation)
- Narco (disambiguation)
