= Tanak (disambiguation) =

The Tanakh or Tanak is the Hebrew Bible.

Tanak or Tenak or Tanakh (Persian: طناك) may refer to the following places in Iran:

- Tanakh, Sistan and Baluchestan
- Tanak-e Olya, South Khorasan Province
- Tanak-e Sofla, South Khorasan Province

Tanak or Tanakh may also refer to:

- Tanakh (band), a musical collective from Richmond, Virginia
- Ott Tänak (born 1987), Estonian rally driver
- Tanak Valt, Nova Prime and husband of Suzerain Adora of Xandar in Marvel comics

== See also ==
- Pentateuch (disambiguation)
- Torah (disambiguation), the Pentateuch
- Chumash (disambiguation)
- Mikra (disambiguation)
- Ta'anakh region (Hebrew: חבל תַּעְנַךְ)
