= Ghias ol Din =

Ghias ol Din غياث الدين
- Village
- Location within Iran
- Coordinates: 32°40′08″N 59°28′27″E
- Country: Iran
- Province: South Khorasan
- County: Sarbisheh
- Bakhsh: Mud
- Rural District: Mud

Population (2006)
  - Total: 33
- Time zone: UTC+3:30 (IRST)
  - Summer (DST): UTC+4:30 (IRDT)

Ghias ol Din (Persian: غياث الدين, also Romanized as Ghīās̄ ol Dīn, Ghīās̄ od Dīn, and Ghīās̄ ed Dīn) is a village in Mud Rural District, Mud District, Sarbisheh County, South Khorasan Province, Iran. At the 2006 census, its population was 33, in 9 families.
