= Bazqush =

Bazqush may refer to:

- Boshgaz
- Kalateh-ye Boshgazi
