= Pedaran =

Pedaran (Persian: پدران) may refer to:

- Pedaran-e Olya
- Pedaran-e Sofla
