= Golnam-e Olya =

Golnam-e Olya گلنام عليا
- Village
- Location within Iran
- Coordinates: 32°18′00″N 59°31′47″E
- Country: Iran
- Province: South Khorasan
- County: Sarbisheh
- Bakhsh: Mud
- Rural District: Naharjan

Population (2006)
  - Total: 129
- Time zone: UTC+3:30 (IRST)
  - Summer (DST): UTC+4:30 (IRDT)

Golnam-e Olya (Persian: گلنام عليا, also Romanized as Golnām-e ‘Olyā; also known as Golnām and Gul Nūm) is a village in Naharjan Rural District, Mud District, Sarbisheh County, South Khorasan Province, Iran. At the 2006 census, its population was 129, in 40 families.
