= Mirca (disambiguation) =

Mirca is a village in Croatia.

Mirca may also refer to:

- Mirca Župnek Sancin (1901-1970), Slovene composer and piano teacher
- Alexandra Mîrca (born 1993), Moldovan archer
- Mirca, Canary Islands, a village near Santa Cruz de La Palma
- Mirca Viola, Italian model, a winner of Miss Italia

== See also ==
- Micra (disambiguation)
- Mirka (disambiguation)
