= Shaftalustan =

Shaftalustan شفتالوستان
- Village
- Location within Iran
- Coordinates: 32°28′02″N 59°35′28″E
- Country: Iran
- Province: South Khorasan
- County: Sarbisheh
- Bakhsh: Mud
- Rural District: Naharjan

Population (2006)
  - Total: 13
- Time zone: UTC+3:30 (IRST)
  - Summer (DST): UTC+4:30 (IRDT)

Shaftalustan (Persian: شفتالوستان, also Romanized as Shaftālūstān and Shaftālestān; also known as Qal‘eh-ye Shaftālestān) is a village in Naharjan Rural District, Mud District, Sarbisheh County, South Khorasan Province, Iran. At the 2006 census, its population was 13, in 5 families.
