= Tanak-e Olya =

Tanak-e Olya طناك عليا
- Village
- Location within Iran
- Coordinates: 32°51′55″N 59°36′52″E
- Country: Iran
- Province: South Khorasan
- County: Sarbisheh
- Bakhsh: Mud
- Rural District: Mud

Population (2006)
  - Total: 107
- Time zone: UTC+3:30 (IRST)
  - Summer (DST): UTC+4:30 (IRDT)

Tanak-e Olya (Persian: طناك عليا, also Romanized as Ţanāk-e ‘Olyā; also known as Tanāk-e Bālā, Ţanak Bālā, Ţanāk-e Bālā, and Tenak Bālā) is a village in Mud Rural District, Mud District, Sarbisheh County, South Khorasan Province, Iran. At the 2006 census, it had a population of 107 and was home to 31 families.
