= Mokhtaran =

Village in South Khorasan province, Iran

Mokhtaran Persian: مختاران
- Village
- Location within Iran
- Coordinates: 32°28′07″N 59°22′55″E
- Country: Iran
- Province: South Khorasan
- County: Sarbisheh
- District: Mud
- Rural District: Naharjan

Population (2016)
  - Total: 664
- Time zone: UTC+3:30 (IRST)

Mokhtaran (Persian: مختاران) (Note: Also romanized as Mokhtārān and Moxtārān; also known as Mukhtārān) is a village in Naharjan Rural District of Mud District in Sarbisheh County, South Khorasan province, Iran.

== Demographics ==
=== Population ===
At the time of the 2006 National Census, the village's population was 804 in 212 households. The following census in 2011 counted 750 people in 236 households. The 2016 census measured the population of the village as 664 people in 206 households.
