= Razq, Sarbisheh =

Village in South Khorasan province, Iran

Razq Persian: رزق
- Village
- Location within Iran
- Coordinates: 32°34′50″N 59°28′33″E
- Country: Iran
- Province: South Khorasan
- County: Sarbisheh
- District: Mud
- Rural District: Naharjan

Population (2016)
  - Total: 143
- Time zone: UTC+3:30 (IRST)

Razq (Persian: رزق) (Note: Also known as Rāzak, Razg, Razk, and Rezq-e Soleymān) is a village in Naharjan Rural District of Mud District in Sarbisheh County, South Khorasan province, Iran.

== Demographics ==
=== Population ===
At the time of the 2006 National Census, the village's population was 191 in 71 households. The following census in 2011 counted 186 people in 71 households. The 2016 census measured the population of the village as 143 people in 64 households.
