= Bizhaem =

Village in South Khorasan province, Iran

Bizhaem Persian: بيژائم
- Village
- Location within Iran
- Coordinates: 32°48′49″N 59°42′12″E
- Country: Iran
- Province: South Khorasan
- County: Sarbisheh
- District: Mud
- Rural District: Mud

Population (2016)
  - Total: 207
- Time zone: UTC+3:30 (IRST)

Bizhaem (Persian: بيژائم) (Note: Also romanized as Bīzhā’em; also known as Baḩā’em, Bīḩan, Bījā’em, and Bījān) is a village in Mud Rural District of Mud District in Sarbisheh County, South Khorasan province, Iran.

== Demographics ==
=== Population ===
At the time of the 2006 National Census, the village's population was 196 in 70 households. The following census in 2011 counted 262 people in 89 households. The 2016 census measured the population of the village as 207 people in 67 households.
