= Kalateh-ye Boshgazi =

Kalateh-ye Boshgazi كلاته بشگزي
- Village
- Location within Iran
- Coordinates: 32°46′56″N 59°32′52″E
- Country: Iran
- Province: South Khorasan
- County: Sarbisheh
- Bakhsh: Mud
- Rural District: Mud

Population (2006)
  - Total: 105
- Time zone: UTC+3:30 (IRST)
  - Summer (DST): UTC+4:30 (IRDT)

Kalateh-ye Boshgazi (Persian: كلاته بشگزي, also Romanized as Kalāteh-ye Boshgazī; also known as Bazqūsh, Buzqush, Kalāteh-ye Losgazī, and Kalāteh-ye Shogazī) is a village in Mud Rural District, Mud District, Sarbisheh County, South Khorasan Province, Iran. At the 2006 census, its population was 105, in 26 families.
