= Esfezar =

Village in South Khorasan province, Iran

Esfezar Persian: اسفزار
- Village
- Location within Iran
- Coordinates: 32°51′57″N 59°37′48″E
- Country: Iran
- Province: South Khorasan
- County: Sarbisheh
- District: Mud
- Rural District: Mud

Population (2016)
  - Total: 394
- Time zone: UTC+3:30 (IRST)

Esfezar (Persian: اسفزار) (Note: Also romanized as Asafzar, Esfazār, and Esfezār; also known as Asfarār, Asferār, Esferār, and Isfizār) is a village in Mud Rural District of Mud District in Sarbisheh County, South Khorasan province, Iran.

== Demographics ==
=== Population ===
At the time of the 2006 National Census, the village's population was 460 in 131 households. The following census in 2011 counted 388 people in 114 households. The 2016 census measured the population of the village as 394 people in 132 households, the most populous in its rural district.
