= Asfij, South Khorasan =

Village in South Khorasan province, Iran

Asfij Persian: اسفيج
- Village
- Location within Iran
- Coordinates: 32°33′40″N 59°32′36″E
- Country: Iran
- Province: South Khorasan
- County: Sarbisheh
- District: Mud
- Rural District: Naharjan

Population (2016)
  - Total: 119
- Time zone: UTC+3:30 (IRST)

Asfij (Persian: اسفيج) (Note: Also romanized as Āsfīj and Esfīj; also known as Arpīsh, Āsfīch, Az Pīsh, and Esfīch) is a village in Naharjan Rural District of Mud District in Sarbisheh County, South Khorasan province, Iran.

== Demographics ==
=== Population ===
At the time of the 2006 National Census, the village's population was 117 in 43 households. The following census in 2011 counted 107 people in 46 households. The 2016 census measured the population of the village as 119 people in 44 households.
