= Kalateh-ye Soleyman =

Village in South Khorasan province, Iran

Kalateh-ye Soleyman Persian: كلاته سليمان
- Village
- Location within Iran
- Coordinates: 32°32′05″N 59°28′45″E
- Country: Iran
- Province: South Khorasan
- County: Sarbisheh
- District: Mud
- Rural District: Naharjan

Population (2016)
  - Total: 194
- Time zone: UTC+3:30 (IRST)

Kalateh-ye Soleyman (Persian: كلاته سليمان) (Note: Also romanized as Kalateh Soleiman and Kalāteh-ye Soleymān; also known as Kalāt-e Soleymān (كلات سليمان), Kalâte-Soleymân, Kalāteh Sulaimān, Kalat-i-Sulaimān, and Soleymān) is a village in, and the capital of, Naharjan Rural District in Mud District of Sarbisheh County, South Khorasan province, Iran.

== Demographics ==
=== Population ===
At the time of the 2006 National Census, the village's population was 201 in 57 households. The following census in 2011 counted 165 people in 52 households. The 2016 census measured the population of the village as 194 people in 63 households.
