= Fal, South Khorasan =

Village in South Khorasan province, Iran

Fal Persian: فال
- Village
- Location within Iran
- Coordinates: 32°32′01″N 59°31′45″E
- Country: Iran
- Province: South Khorasan
- County: Sarbisheh
- District: Mud
- Rural District: Naharjan

Population (2016)
  - Total: 105
- Time zone: UTC+3:30 (IRST)

Fal (Persian: فال) (Note: Also romanized as Fāl) is a village in Naharjan Rural District of Mud District in Sarbisheh County, South Khorasan province, Iran.

== Demographics ==
=== Population ===
At the time of the 2006 National Census, the village's population was 104 in 32 households. The following census in 2011 counted 82 people in 28 households. The 2016 census measured the population of the village as 105 people in 40 households.
