= Zeydar, South Khorasan =

Village in South Khorasan province, Iran

Zeydar Persian: زيدر
- Village
- Location within Iran
- Coordinates: 32°18′50″N 59°28′18″E
- Country: Iran
- Province: South Khorasan
- County: Sarbisheh
- District: Mud
- Rural District: Naharjan

Population (2016)
  - Total: 208
- Time zone: UTC+3:30 (IRST)

Zeydar (Persian: زيدر) (Note: Also known as Zaidar, Zainalābād and Zeynalābād) is a village in Naharjan Rural District of Mud District in Sarbisheh County, South Khorasan province, Iran.

== Demographics ==
=== Population ===
At the time of the 2006 National Census, the village's population was 373 in 90 households. The following census in 2011 counted 281 people in 81 households. The 2016 census measured the population of the village as 208 people in 59 households.
