= Rine =

Rine may refer to:

- Rhyne, a type of drainage ditch
- Rinə, a village in Azerbaijan
