= Chenesht =

Village in South Khorasan province, Iran

Chenesht Persian: چنشت
- Village
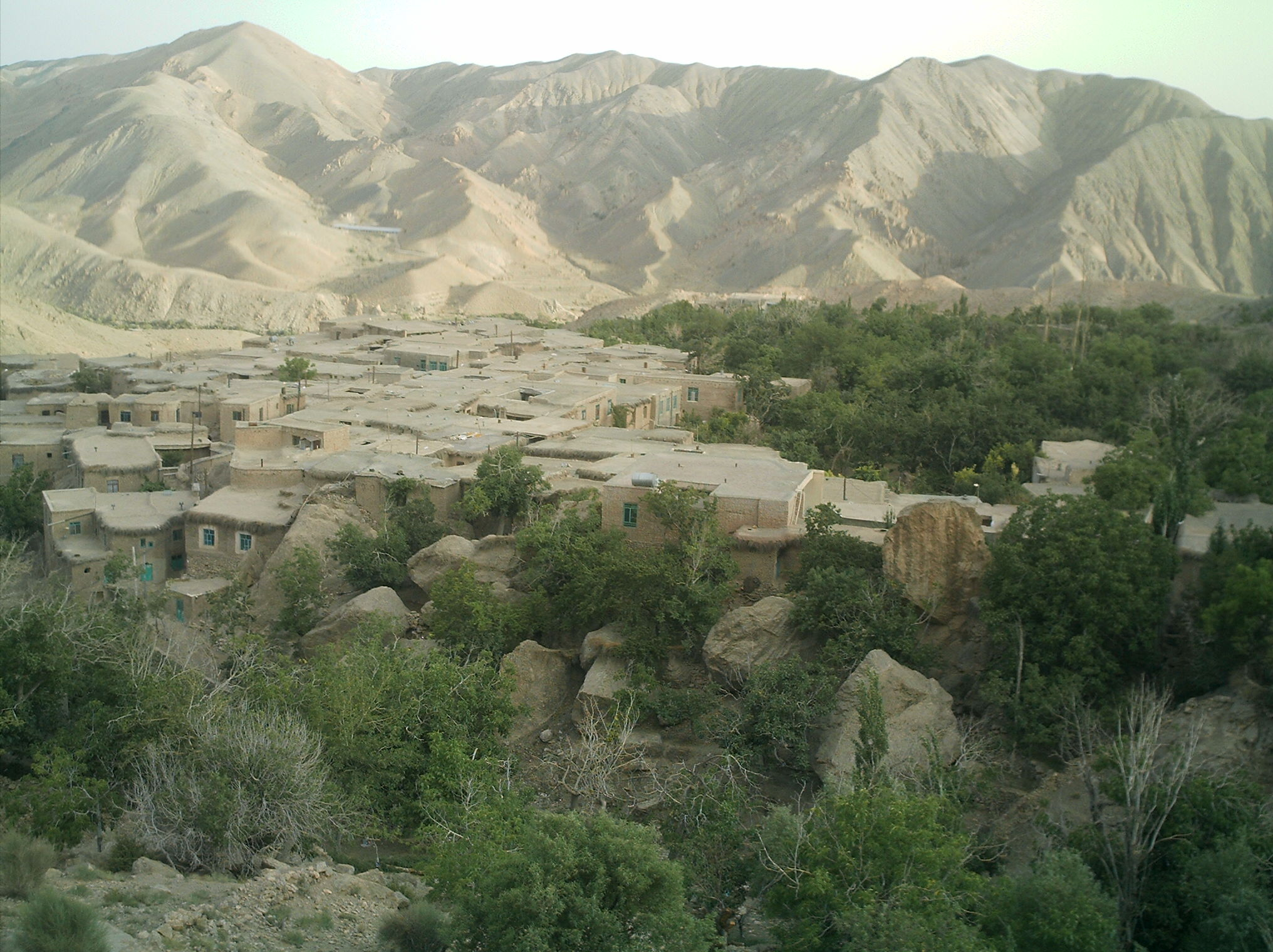
- The village of Chenesht

- Location within Iran
- Coordinates: 32°37′55″N 59°24′09″E
- Country: Iran
- Province: South Khorasan
- County: Sarbisheh
- District: Mud
- Rural District: Naharjan

Population (2016)
  - Total: 1,157
- Time zone: UTC+3:30 (IRST)

Chenesht (Persian: چنشت) (Note: Also known as Çenect, Chenīsht, and Chinisht) is a village in Naharjan Rural District of Mud District in Sarbisheh County, South Khorasan province, Iran.

== Demographics ==
=== Population ===
At the time of the 2006 National Census, the village's population was 1,009 in 286 households. The following census in 2011 counted 1,200 people in 355 households. The 2016 census measured the population of the village as 1,157 people in 342 households, the most populous in its rural district.
