= Shavakand =

Village in South Khorasan province, Iran

Shavakand Persian: شواكند
- Village
- Location within Iran
- Coordinates: 32°38′41″N 59°30′48″E
- Country: Iran
- Province: South Khorasan
- County: Sarbisheh
- District: Mud
- Rural District: Mud

Population (2016)
  - Total: 268
- Time zone: UTC+3:30 (IRST)

Shavakand (Persian: شواكند) (Note: Also romanized as Shavākand and Shewakand) is a village in Mud Rural District of Mud District in Sarbisheh County, South Khorasan province, Iran.

== Demographics ==
=== Population ===
At the time of the 2006 National Census, the village's population was 143 in 51 households. The following census in 2011 counted 205 people in 73 households. The 2016 census measured the population of the village as 268 people in 97 households.
