= Kalateh-ye Mian Rud =

Kalateh-ye Mian Rud may refer to:

- Kalateh-ye Now, Arabkhaneh
- Mian Rud, South Khorasan
