= Chuvash =

Chuvash may refer to:

- Chuvash people
- Chuvash language
- Chuvashia (Chuvash Republic), within Russia
  - Chuvash Autonomous Oblast (1920–1925), within the Soviet Union
  - Chuvash Autonomous Soviet Socialist Republic (1925–1992), within the Soviet Union
- Çuvaş, an Azerbaijani village

== See also ==
- Chumash (disambiguation)
