= Morrinhos =

Morrinhos may refer to one of the following places in Brazil:

- Morrinhos, Ceará, a city in the state of Ceará
- Morrinhos, Goiás, a city in the state of Goiás
  - Morrinhos Futebol Clube, a football club in Morrinhos, Goiás
- Morrinhos do Sul, a municipality in the state of Rio Grande do Sul
  - Morrinhos, Rio Grande do Sul, a city in the municipality
