= Gaz, Sarbisheh =

Village in South Khorasan province, Iran

Gaz Persian: گز
- Village
- Location within Iran
- Coordinates: 32°35′43″N 59°21′00″E
- Country: Iran
- Province: South Khorasan
- County: Sarbisheh
- District: Mud
- Rural District: Naharjan

Population (2016)
  - Total: 140
- Time zone: UTC+3:30 (IRST)

Gaz (Persian: گز) is a village in Naharjan Rural District of Mud District in Sarbisheh County, South Khorasan province, Iran.

== Demographics ==
=== Population ===
At the time of the 2006 National Census, the village's population was 222 in 75 households. The following census in 2011 counted 214 people in 76 households. The 2016 census measured the population of the village as 140 people in 54 households.
