= Fanud =

Village in South Khorasan province, Iran

Fanud Persian: فنود
- Village
- Location within Iran
- Coordinates: 32°39′10″N 59°29′28″E
- Country: Iran
- Province: South Khorasan
- County: Sarbisheh
- District: Mud
- Rural District: Mud

Population (2016)
  - Total: 188
- Time zone: UTC+3:30 (IRST)

Fanud (Persian: فنود) (Note: Also romanized as Fanood and Fanūd) is a village in Mud Rural District of Mud District in Sarbisheh County, South Khorasan province, Iran.

== Demographics ==
=== Population ===
At the time of the 2006 National Census, the village's population was 327 in 108 households. The following census in 2011 counted 275 people in 81 households. The 2016 census measured the population of the village as 188 people in 84 households.
