= Pedaran-e Olya =

Pedaran-e Olya پدران عليا
- Village
- Location within Iran
- Coordinates: 32°41′05″N 59°35′32″E
- Country: Iran
- Province: South Khorasan
- County: Sarbisheh
- Bakhsh: Mud
- Rural District: Mud

Population (2006)
  - Total: 59
- Time zone: UTC+3:30 (IRST)
  - Summer (DST): UTC+4:30 (IRDT)

Pedaran-e Olya (Persian: پدران عليا, also Romanized as Pedarān-e ‘Olyā; also known as Kalāteh-ye Peydarān-e Bālā and Kalāteh-ye Pedarān-e Bālā) is a village in Mud Rural District, Mud District, Sarbisheh County, South Khorasan Province, Iran. At the 2006 census, its population was 59, in 15 families.
