= Karimabad, Sarbisheh =

Village in South Khorasan province, Iran

Karimabad Persian: كريم اباد
- Village
- Location within Iran
- Coordinates: 32°49′48″N 59°33′58″E
- Country: Iran
- Province: South Khorasan
- County: Sarbisheh
- District: Mud
- Rural District: Mud

Population (2016)
  - Total: 137
- Time zone: UTC+3:30 (IRST)

Karimabad (Persian: كريم اباد) (Note: Also romanized as Karīmābād; also known as Karim Abad Mo’men Abad) is a village in Mud Rural District of Mud District in Sarbisheh County, South Khorasan province, Iran.

== Demographics ==
=== Population ===
At the time of the 2006 National Census, the village's population was 85 in 26 households. The following census in 2011 counted 141 people in 38 households. The 2016 census measured the population of the village as 137 people in 45 households.
