= Mahdi Balali-Mood =

Iranian toxicologist and professor (born 1942)

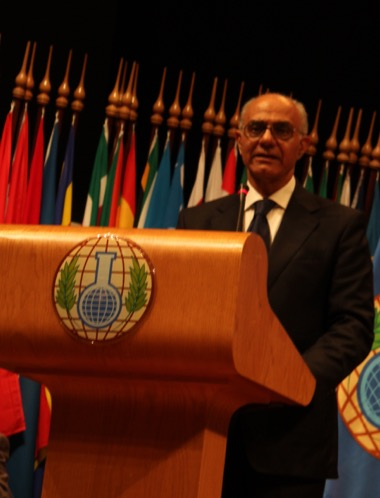
- Balali-Mood at the World Forum, OPCW The Hague Award Acceptance Speech, 2015
- Born: September 6, 1942 (age 83); Mud, Iran
- Education: University of Tehran (MD); University of Edinburgh (PhD)
- Scientific career
- Fields: Toxicology; Clinical pharmacology Chemical warfare

Mahdi Balali-Mood (Persian: مهدی بلالی مود) (born September 6, 1942, in Moud, Iran) is an Iranian medical toxicologist, and professor of medicine, clinical pharmacology and toxicology. He was awarded OPCW-The Hague Award in recognition of his pioneering work in clinical management of victims of chemicals weapons and dedicating his career to caring and advocating for the victims of chemical weapons. He is credited as the father of Toxicology of Iran.

== Career ==
Balali-Mood's prominent contribution to clinical research dates back to 1970's at University of Edinburgh Medical School and his research on Mefenamic acid (MA) that lead to the first original paper published in The Lancet demonstrating the toxic effect of MA as seizure-inducing agent, leading to grand mal convulsion.

Following his PhD, Balali-Mood was appointed as Lecturer at Edinburgh University, a position he left shortly after the use of chemical warfare in the Iran-Iraq war became apparent. He returned to Iran during the war, at a time when there were no other Clinical Toxicologists in the country. Balali-Mood played a pivotal role in orchestrating efforts in treatment of victims of the chemical war and provided guidelines nationally and internationally.

Balali-Mood has served as an advisor to the International Programme on Chemical Safety (IPCS), the World Health Organization (WHO) and has made key contributions to the preparation of the guidelines for initial clinical management of patients exposed to chemical weapons. and public health response to biological and chemical weapons WHO guidance. He served as a member of Scientific Advisory Board of the Organisation for the Prohibition of Chemical Weapons (OPCW)

Balali-Mood has done extensive medical research on the delayed effects of Sulfur Mustard and remains an advocate for the victim of the chemical war.

Balali-Mood is an emeritus professor of Medicine and Clinical Toxicology of Mashhad University of Medical Sciences

== Awards ==
- Iran's National Elites Foundation Allameh Tabatabaei Award, 2019
- OPCW–The Hague Award, awarded by the Organisation for the Prohibition of Chemical Weapons, 2015
- Laureate of Highest International Prof. Alireza Yalda Foundation Award for Distinguished Teaching, Research, Ethical and Social Responsibility in Medical Sciences, 2011.
- Order of Research Expertise Award Badge of Honor, 2011.

== Memberships ==
- Permanent Fellow, The World Academy of Sciences, (since 1997)
- Founding Member, Vice President (1992–2000), President (1996–2004) and Honorary Fellow of the Asia Pacific Association of Medical Toxicology (APAMT)
- Founding Member of the Iranian Society of Toxicology, first President and elected President 1992-1998 and 2001–2003.
- Member, Iranian Academy of Medical Sciences

== Books (editor and contributor) ==
- Practical Guide for Medical Management of Chemical Warfare Casualties. OPCW publication, 2016.
- Basic and Clinical Toxicology of Mustard Compounds. Springer, 2015.
- Biological Toxins and Bioterrorism. Springer 2015.
- Basic and Clinical Toxicology of Organophosphorous Compounds. Springer, 2014.
