= Pedaran-e Sofla =

Pedaran-e Sofla پدران سفلي
- Village
- Location within Iran
- Coordinates: 32°41′37″N 59°35′20″E
- Country: Iran
- Province: South Khorasan
- County: Sarbisheh
- Bakhsh: Mud
- Rural District: Mud

Population (2006)
  - Total: 29
- Time zone: UTC+3:30 (IRST)
  - Summer (DST): UTC+4:30 (IRDT)

Pedaran-e Sofla (Persian: پدران سفلي, also Romanized as Pedarān-e Soflá; also known as Kalāteh-ye Peydarān-e Pā’īn, Kalateh-i-Pidarān, Kalāteh-ye Pedarān-e Pā’īn, and Pedarān) is a village in Mud Rural District, Mud District, Sarbisheh County, South Khorasan Province, Iran. At the 2006 census, its population was 29, in 7 families.
