= Tanak-e Sofla =

Tanak-e Sofla طناک سفلی
- Village
- Location within Iran
- Coordinates: 32°51′24″N 59°36′27″E
- Country: Iran
- Province: South Khorasan
- County: Sarbisheh
- Bakhsh: Mud
- Rural District: Mud

Population (2006)
  - Total: 199
- Time zone: UTC+3:30 (IRST)
  - Summer (DST): UTC+4:30 (IRDT)

Tanak-e Sofla (Persian: طناک سفلی, also Romanized as Ţanāk-e Soflá; also known as Tanāk-e Pā’īn and Ţanāk-e Pā’īn) is a village in Mud Rural District, Mud District, Sarbisheh County, South Khorasan Province, Iran. At the 2006 census, its population was 199, in 54 families.
