= Marco, Ceará =

Municipality in Ceará, Brazil

Coordinates: 3°07′26″S 40°08′49″W

Marco
- Municipality
- Municipality of Marco
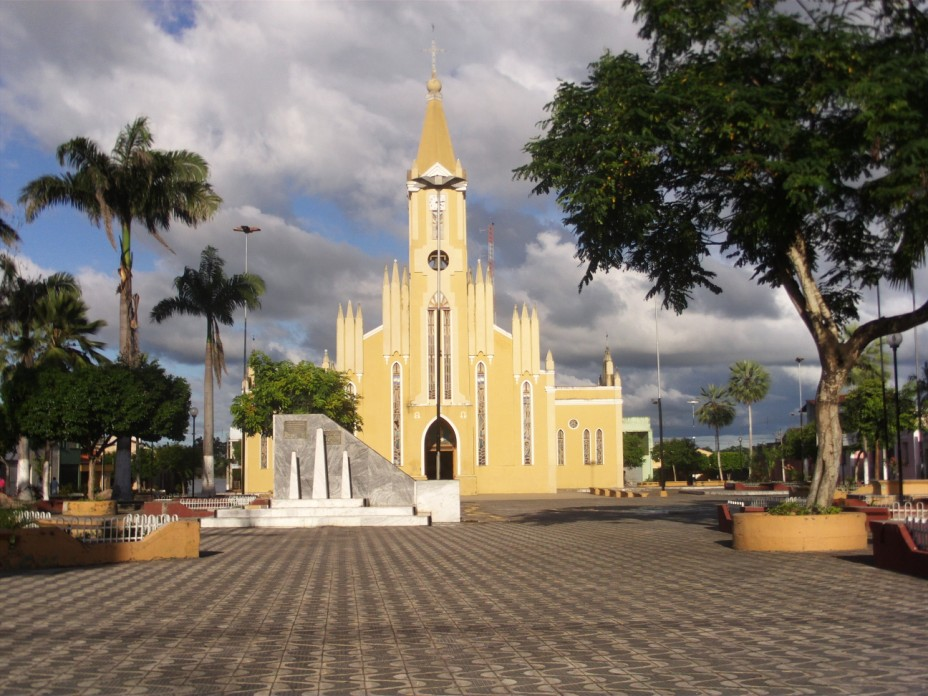

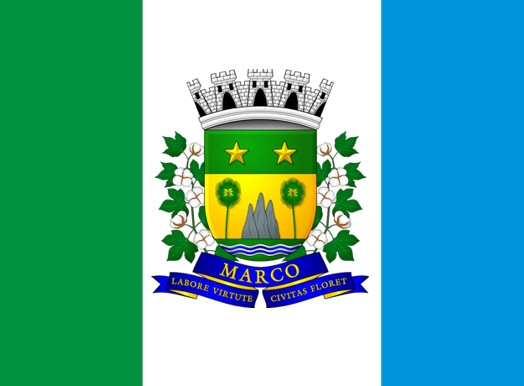
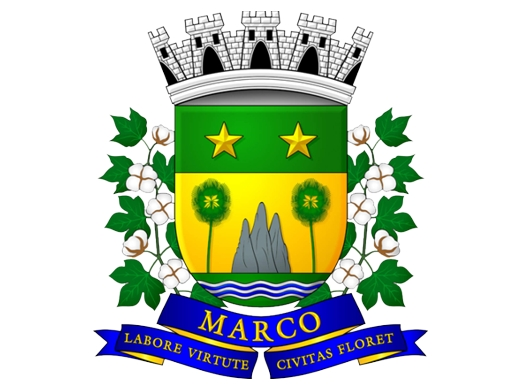
- Flag Coat of arms

- Location in Ceará
- Country: Brazil
- Region: Northeast
- State: Ceará
- Immediate: Acaraú

Area
  - Total: 221.47 sq mi (573.61 km^{2})

Population (2022)
  - Total: 25,799
- Time zone: UTC−3 (BRT)
- Website: www.marco.ce.gov.br

Marco is a municipality in the state of Ceará in the Northeast Region of Brazil. With an area of 573.61 square kilometers (221.47 sq mi), of which 4.4206 square kilometres (1.7068 sq mi) is urban, it is located 191 km from Fortaleza, the state capital, and 1,645 km from Brasília, the federal capital. Its population in the 2022 demographic census was 25,799 inhabitants, according to the Brazilian Institute of Geography and Statistics (IBGE), ranking as the 72nd most populous municipality in the state of Ceará.

== Geography ==
The territory of Marco covers 573.61 square kilometers (221.47 sq mi), of which 4.4206 square kilometres (1.7068 sq mi) constitutes the urban area. It sits at an average altitude of 29 meters above sea level. Marco borders these municipalities: to the north, Bela Cruz; to the south, Senador Sá and Morrinhos; to the east, Acaraú, Bela Cruz again, and Morrinhos; and to the west, Granja and Senador Sá again. The city is located 191 km from the state capital Fortaleza, and 1,645 km from the federal capital Brasília.

Under the territorial division established in 2017 by the Brazilian Institute of Geography and Statistics (IBGE), the municipality belongs to the immediate geographical region of Acaraú, within the intermediate region of Sobral. Previously, under the microregion and mesoregion divisions, it was part of the microregion of Litoral de Camocim in the mesoregion of Noroeste Cearense.

== Demographics ==
Between the censuses of 2010 and 2022, the population of Marco registered a growth of just over 4.4%, with an annual geometric growth rate of 0.36%. With 25,799 inhabitants in the 2022 census (62.48% living in the urban area), the municipality ranked only 72nd in the state that year, with 50,47% male and 49,53% female, resulting in a sex ratio of 101.9 (1,019 men for every 1,000 women), compared to 24,703 inhabitants in the 2010 census, when it held the 76th state position. Regarding age group in the 2022 census, 70.65% of the inhabitants were between 15 and 64 years old, 22.28% were under fifteen, and 7.07% were 65 or older. The population density in 2022 was 44.98 inhabitants per square kilometer, with an average of 2.93 inhabitants per household.

The municipality's Human Development Index (HDI-M) was considered medium, according to data from the United Nations Development Programme (UNDP). According to the 2010 report published in 2013, its value was 0.615, ranking 87th in the state (out of 184 municipalities) and 3,796th nationally (out of 5,565 municipalities), and the Gini coefficient rose from 0.43 in 2003 to 0.54 in 2010. Considering only the longevity index, its value is 0.734, the income index is 0.564, and the education index is 0.553.

== See also ==
- List of municipalities in Ceará

== Bibliography ==
- Silva, José Alfredo (2002). Breve História do Município de Marco (PDF). Fortaleza: Institute for Research and Studies on the Development of Ceará.
