= Kumpula Campus =

Coordinates: 60°12′16″N 24°57′46″E

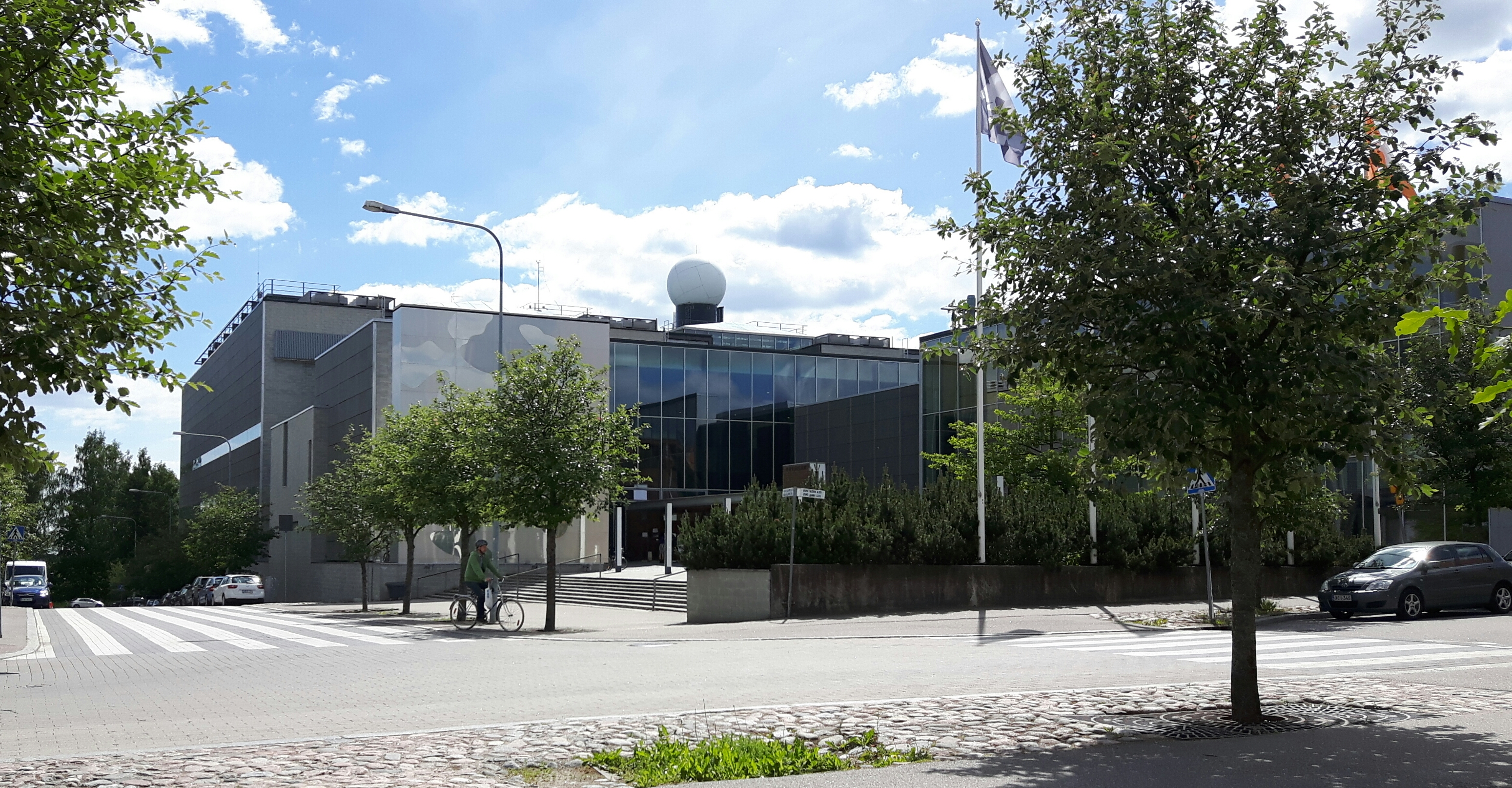
The Physicum building.

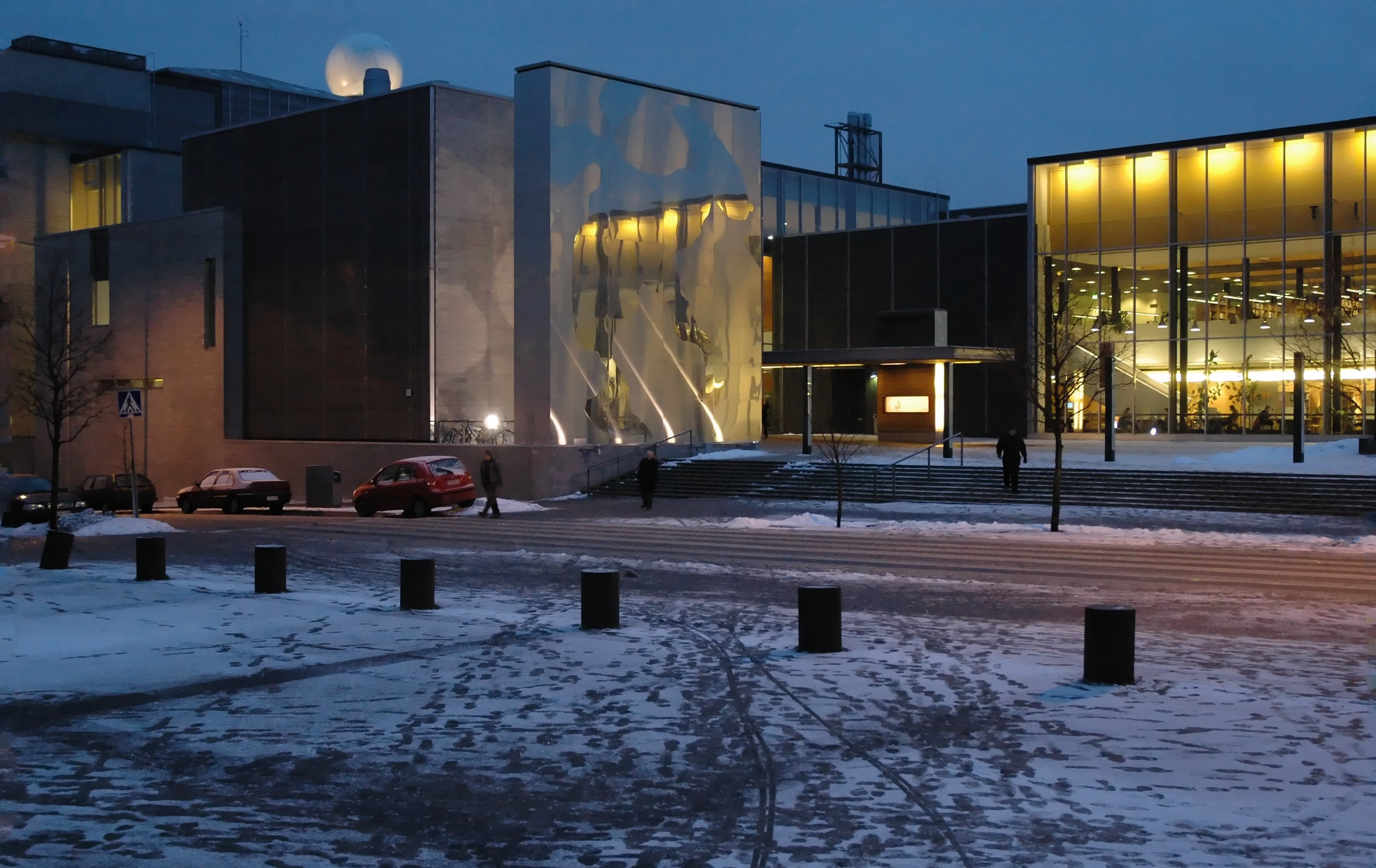
The entrance to the Physicum building in winter. The artwork on the wall depicts density of galaxies in the nearby universe. One can also see the weather radar dome on the roof.

The Kumpula Campus (Finnish: Kumpulan kampus, Swedish: Campus Gumtäkt) is a science campus of the University of Helsinki. The campus is located some four kilometres from the centre of Helsinki, in the Kumpula district. Completed in 2005, it currently provides study and research facilities for about 6,000 students and 1,000 teachers/researchers.

== Departments of the Faculty of Science ==
The University of Helsinki departments housed on the campus are:

- Department of Chemistry
- Department of Computer Science
- Department of Geosciences and Geography
- Department of Mathematics and Statistics
- Department of Physics

== Other institutions ==
A number of related or independent institutions are housed on the campus, e.g.:

- The Finnish Institute for Verification of the Chemical Weapons Convention (VERIFIN)
- The Finnish Museum of Natural History Dating Laboratory
- The Helsinki Institute of Physics (HIP)
- The Helsinki Institute for Information Technology (HIIT)
- The Institute of Seismology
- The Luma Centre
- The Finnish Meteorological Institute (FMI)
- Integrated Carbon Observation System (ICOS)

The Kumpula Science Library provides scientific library services for the campus.

== Buildings ==
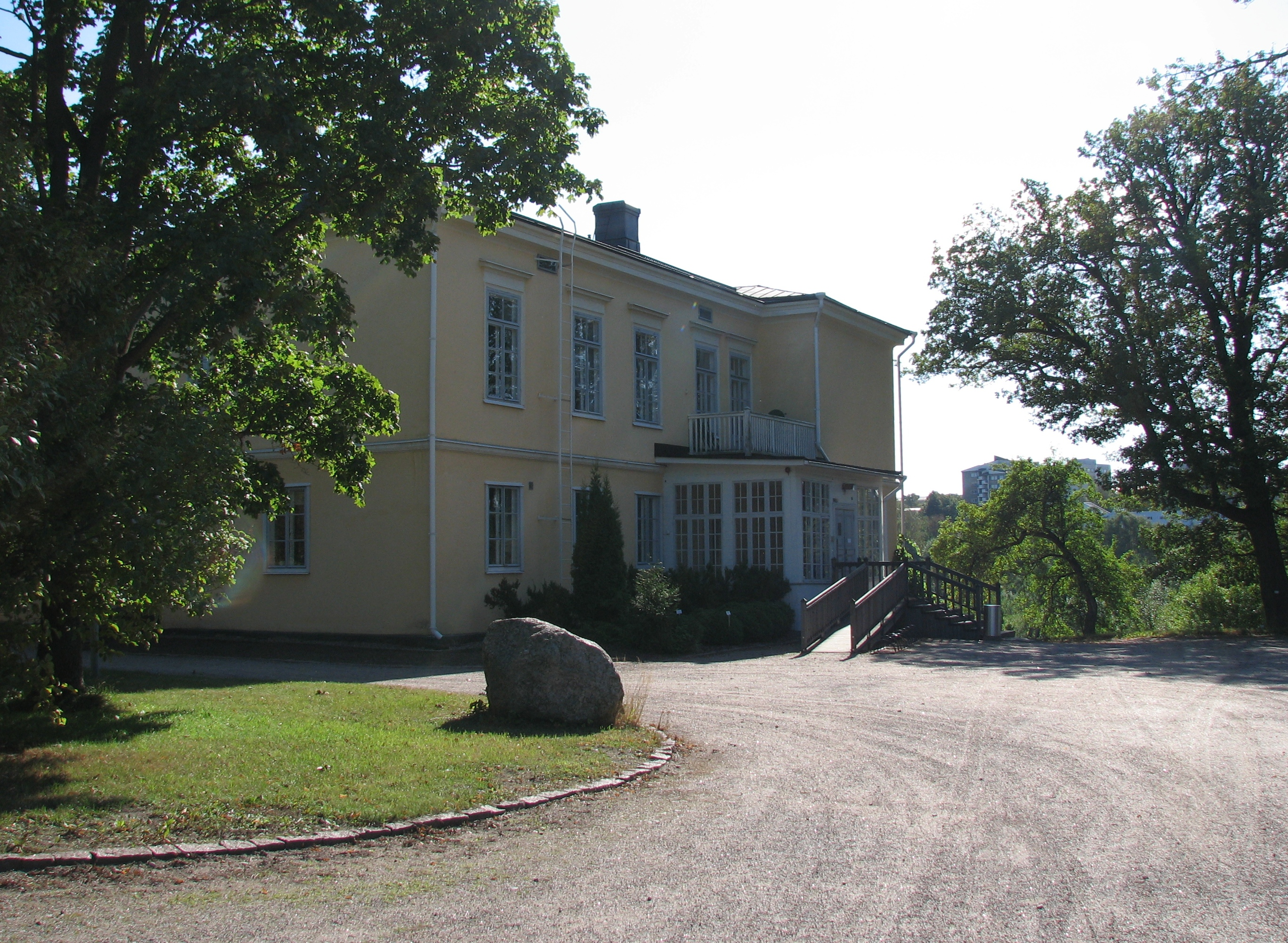
The former administrative office of the Faculty of Science.

The campus consists of the following buildings:

- Chemicum (Dept. of Chemistry; VERIFIN)
- Physicum (Depts. of Physics, Geography, and Geology; Science Library; Dating Lab.; HIP)
- Exactum (Depts. of Computer Science and Math & Statistics; I. of Seismology; HIIT)
- Dynamicum (FIMR, FMI, ICOS)
- Accelerator Laboratory
- Kumpula manor
- Sport Center

The Kumpula Botanical Garden is located adjacent to the campus.
