= Narc =

Narc, nark or NARC may refer to:

== Places ==
- Nark, Iran, a village in Razavi Khorasan Province

== People ==
- An informant, sometimes known as a nark or narc
- A narcotics officer, a specialized law enforcement professional dedicated to combating drug-related criminal activity
- Nark of Champasak, a king in Laos
- Vaughn Nark, jazz trumpeter

== Art, entertainment, and media ==
=== Fictional characters ===
- Narc, an orc-like character in the parody Bored of the Rings
- Narc, a minor character in the animated TV series Samurai Jack

=== Other arts, entertainment, and media ===
- Narc (film), a 2002 film
- Narc (video game), a 1988 arcade game and a 2005 video game
- "Narc", a song by Interpol from Antics

== Organizations ==
- National Advertising Review Council, an American advertising industry body
- National Agricultural Research Centre in Pakistan
- National Rainbow Coalition, a political party in Kenya
- National Rainbow Coalition – Kenya (NARC–Kenya), a political party in Kenya
- North American Rayon Corporation
- National Association for Retarded Children, the former name of Arc of the United States, a disability organization

== Science ==
- Neutrino Array Radio Calibration in Antarctica

== See also ==
- Narco (disambiguation)
