= Vıləşə =

- Village
- Location within Azerbaijan
- Coordinates: 38°35′25″N 48°46′44″E
- Country: Azerbaijan
- Rayon: Astara
- Municipality: Rinə
- Time zone: UTC+4 (AZT)

Vıləşə is a village in the municipality of Rinə in the Astara Rayon of Azerbaijan.
