= Pentateuch (disambiguation) =

The Pentateuch is the first part of the Bible, consisting of Genesis, Exodus, Leviticus, Numbers, and Deuteronomy. It is also known as the Torah.

Pentateuch may also refer to:

- Ashburnham Pentateuch, late 6th- or early 7th-century Latin illuminated manuscript of the Pentateuch
- Chumash, printed Torah, as opposed to a Torah scroll
- Samaritan Pentateuch, a version of the Hebrew Pentateuch, written in the Samaritan alphabet and used by the Samaritans, for whom it is the entire biblical canon
- Targum Yerushalmi, a western targum (translation) of the Torah (Pentateuch) from the land of Israel (as opposed to the eastern Babylonian Targum Onkelos)

== See also ==
- Torah (disambiguation)
- Chumash (disambiguation)
- Tanak (disambiguation)
- Hexateuch
- Octateuch
