= Torah (disambiguation) =

Torah refers to the first five books of the Hebrew Bible (the Pentateuch), and the law derived from them.

Torah may also refer to:

== Religion ==
- 613 commandments in Rabbinic Judaism
- Chumash (Judaism), printed bound book form of the first five books of the Hebrew Bible
- Law of Moses, the Torah or the first five books of the Hebrew Bible
- Oral Torah
- Samaritan Torah
- Sefer Torah, handwritten copy of the Torah

== People ==
- Torah Bright, Australian snowboarder

== Arts and entertainment ==
- Torah, 1937 poem by Yonatan Ratosh

=== Music ===
- Torah, album by Mordechai Ben David
- Torah, album by Tommy Smith (saxophonist)
- "Torah Dance", song by Eartha Kitt

== Locations ==
- Al-Tawrat, another name for Qanbar Ali, an old Jewish neighborhood in Baghdad

== See also ==
- Tanak (disambiguation), the Hebrew Bible
- Pentateuch (disambiguation)
- Chumash (disambiguation)
