= Mian Rud, South Khorasan =

Village in South Khorasan province, Iran

Mian Rud Persian: ميان رود
- Village
- Location within Iran
- Coordinates: 32°28′15″N 59°31′24″E
- Country: Iran
- Province: South Khorasan
- County: Sarbisheh
- District: Mud
- Rural District: Naharjan

Population (2016)
  - Total: 137
- Time zone: UTC+3:30 (IRST)

Mian Rud (Persian: ميان رود) (Note: Also romanized as Meyan Rūd, Mīān Rūd, and Miyan Rood; also known as Kalāteh Miyānrūd and Kalāteh-ye Mīān Rūd) is a village in Naharjan Rural District of Mud District in Sarbisheh County, South Khorasan province, Iran.

== Demographics ==
=== Population ===
At the time of the 2006 National Census, the village's population was 193 in 63 households. The following census in 2011 counted 168 people in 58 households. The 2016 census measured the population of the village as 137 people in 45 households.
