= Alastair Hay =

Alastair Hay OBE
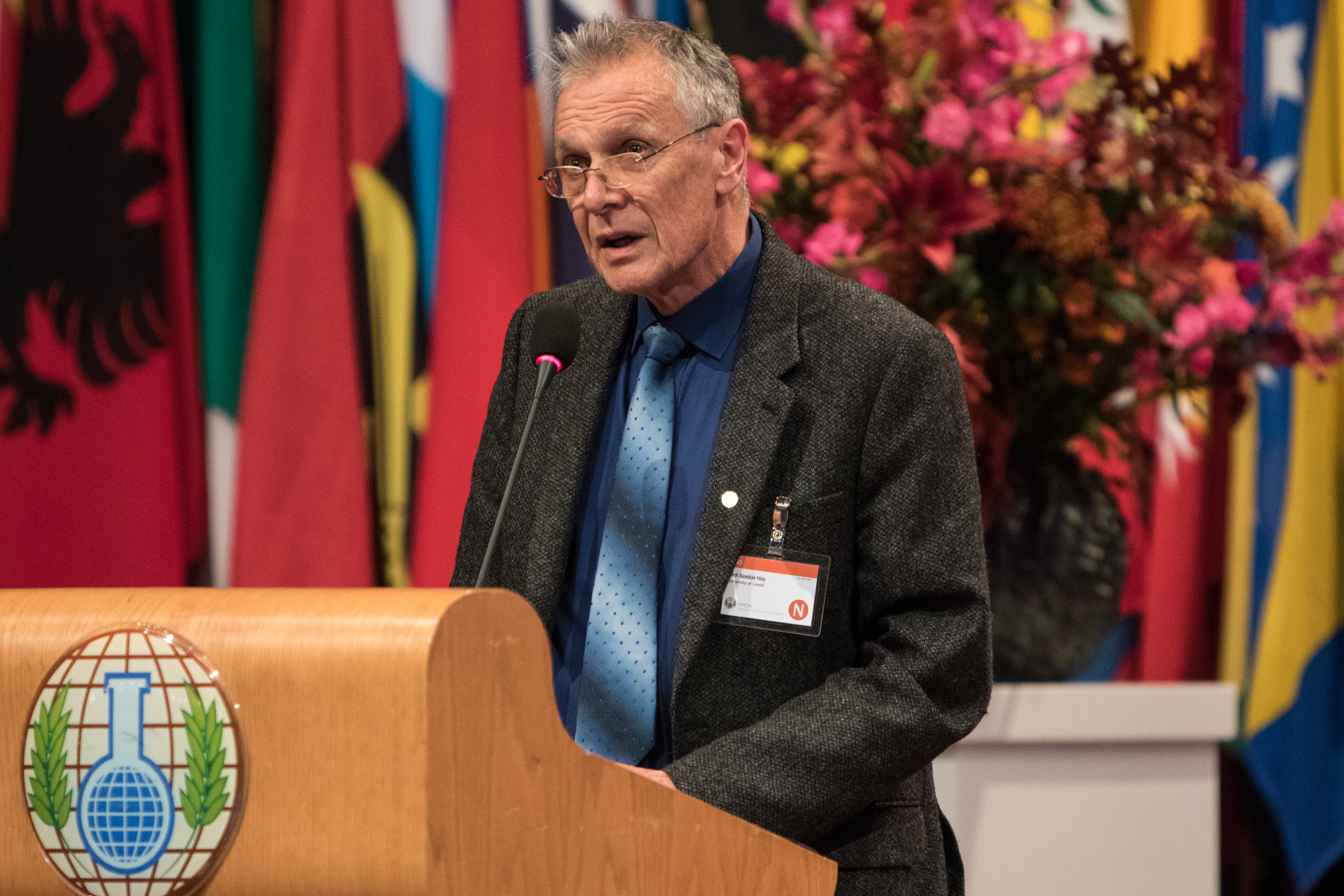
- Born: Alastair Watt Macintyre Hay; 1947 (age 78–79)
- Education: Royal Holloway, University of London (PhD)
- Awards: OPCW–The Hague Award (2015)
- Scientific career
- Fields: Chemical warfare Biological warfare
- Workplaces: University of Leeds
- Thesis: Fructose metabolism in the liver (1973)
- Website: medhealth.leeds.ac.uk/profile/522/905/alastair_w_m__hay

Alastair Watt Macintyre Hay OBE (born April 1947) is a British toxicologist, and a Professor of Environmental Toxicology; he works primarily in the fields of chemical warfare and biological warfare (CBW).

== Education ==
Hay gained a Bachelor of Science degree in Chemistry in 1969, in London, though had started with Maths and Chemistry, and a PhD in Biochemistry in 1973 for research on the metabolism of fructose (fructolysis) in the liver.

== Career and research ==
Hay started his career at the chemical pathology department at the University of Leeds. He became Professor of Environmental Toxicology.

He provided assistance to the forming of the Chemical Weapons Convention in 1993, becoming international law in 1997. He works in the Leeds Institute of Cardiovascular and Metabolic Medicine. In 1995 he worked with Physicians for Human Rights (PHR). In 2004 he helped prepare the World Health Organization's (WHO) manual: Public health response to biological and chemical weapons.

Hay is an active advocate for promoting ethics to new generations of scientists, and he has headed a group of the International Union of Pure and Applied Chemistry (IUPAC) for educational materials on chemical warfare, which led to the creation of an online resource on "Multiple Uses of Chemicals". He has also represented the IUPAC for preparation of the Biological Weapons Convention (also known as the Biological and Toxin Weapons Convention).

=== Publications ===
- No fire, no thunder: the threat of chemical and biological weapons, Pluto Press, 1984, ISBN 0861047389
- A Magic Sword or a Big Itch: An Historical Look at the United States Biological Weapons Programme, Medicine, Conflict and Survival, 1999
- Simulants, Stimulants and Diseases: The Evolution of the United States Biological Warfare Programme, 1945–60, Medicine, Conflict and Survival, July 1999

=== Awards and honours ===
He was awarded the 2015 OPCW-The Hague Award by the Organisation for the Prohibition of Chemical Weapons. Hay was appointed Order of the British Empire (OBE) in the 2003 Birthday Honours for services to occupational health.
