= Macro =

Macro (or MACRO) may refer to:

== Science and technology ==
- Macroscopic, subjects visible to the eye
- Macro photography, a type of close-up photography
- Image macro, a picture with text superimposed
- Monopole, Astrophysics and Cosmic Ray Observatory (MACRO), a particle physics experiment
- Macronutrients, classes of chemical compounds humans consume in the largest quantities (i.e., proteins, fats, and carbohydrates)

=== Sociology ===
- Macrosociology, sociology at the national level
- Macroeconomics, economics at a higher level, above individual markets
- Macromanagement in business, the idea of "managing from afar"

=== Computing ===
- Macro (computer science), a set of instructions that is represented in an abbreviated format
- Macro instruction, a statement, typically for an assembler, that invokes a macro definition to generate a sequence of instructions or other outputs
- Macro key, a key found on some keyboards, particularly older keyboards.

== Media and entertainment ==
- Macromanagement (gameplay), high-level decision making in games
- Macro Recordings, a German electronic music label
- Macro analysis of chords and chord progressions
- Macro (album), a 2019 album by Jinjer

== Other uses ==
- Macrobiotics, a diet and lifestyle based on eating natural, organic food
- Museum of Contemporary Art of Rome (MACRO), Italy
- Cox Macro (1686–1767), English Anglican priest and antiquarian
- Naevius Sutorius Macro (21 BC – 38 AD), praetorian prefect in the Roman Empire

== See also ==
- Marco (disambiguation)
- Makro, a retail brand
- Micro (disambiguation)
- Mikro (disambiguation)
- Large (disambiguation) (macro: a Greek prefix meaning long or large)
- List of commonly used taxonomic affixes
