= Mud, Iran =

City in South Khorasan province, Iran

Mud Persian: مود
- City
- Location within Iran
- Coordinates: 32°42′26″N 59°31′26″E
- Country: Iran
- Province: South Khorasan
- County: Sarbisheh
- District: Mud

Population (2016)
  - Total: 3,477
- Time zone: UTC+3:30 (IRST)

Mud (Persian: مود) (Note: Also romanized as Mood, Moud, and Mūd; also known as Mood Nahar Khan and Mūd-e Dahanāb) is the capital city of Mud District in Sarbisheh County, South Khorasan province, Iran. It also serves as the administrative center for Mud Rural District.

== History ==
Archaeologists excavating in the southern historical town of Moud in South Khorasan province have unearthed ancient earthenware dating back to the Parthian dynastic era (248 BCE – 224 CE). Excavations were conducted on an ancient mound located near the city of Birjand. Numerous historical artifacts, dating back from the pre-historic eras up to the Safavid dynasty were found at the site.

The last prince of Birjand was Shah Seyyed Ali Kazemi who came from Moud (where most people were related with him), a relative of the emperor Shah Reza Pahlavi and the Prime minister Asadollah Alam.

Prior to the separation of the province from the former Khorasan province, Mud was a borough of the current provincial capital, Birjand.

== Demographics ==
=== Population ===
At the time of the 2006 National Census, the city's population was 2,451 in 695 households. The following census in 2011 counted 3,067 people in 910 households. The 2016 census measured the population of the city as 3,477 people in 1,061 households.

== Weaving ==
The area is known for Mud blankets and carpets that have normally a curvilinear design with a sunflower-shaped picture in the center. The production of such carpets is usually of high quality. These carpets are made of wool or cotton. They attained their valuation by the decree of the Persian Safavid emperor Shah Abbas I, who not only arranged the building of the fortresses in this region, but also retained the original Persian design styles and knot techniques.

== Notable people ==
- Shah Seyyed Ali Kazemi (born in Mud, †1984 in Birjand), last tribal leader of Muod and Birjand at the beginning of the Pahlavi dynasty
- Kazem Motamadnedjad (born in Mud), communication scientist
- Mahdi Balali-Mood (born in Mud), Medical Toxicologist
- Marcel Kasemi, crown prince
