= Taxtakəran =

- Village
- Location within Azerbaijan
- Coordinates: 38°35′N 48°46′E
- Country: Azerbaijan
- Rayon: Astara
- Municipality: Rinə
- Time zone: UTC+4 (AZT)

Taxtakəran is a village in the municipality of Rinə in the Astara Rayon of Azerbaijan.
