= Narco =

Narco or Narcos may refer to:

== Culture ==
- Narcoculture in Mexico, people involved in organized crime

== Entertainment and media ==
- Narco (film), 2004 French film
- Narcos (2015), a Netflix Original drama series
- Narcos: Mexico, a Netflix Original drama series
- Narco pelicula, sub-genre of Mexican action film

== Books ==
- El Narco: Inside Mexico's Criminal Insurgency (2011), a non-fiction book about the Mexican Drug War

== Music ==
- "Narco" (song), by Blasterjaxx and Timmy Trumpet, 2017
- "Narcos" (Anuel AA song), 2020
- "Narcos" (Migos song), 2018

== Medical ==
- Hydrocodone/paracetamol, sold in some countries under the brand name Narco
- Narcolepsy, human sleep disorder

== See also ==
- Nark or Narc (disambiguation)
- Narko, Queensland
- Marco (disambiguation)
- Marko (disambiguation)
