= Finnish Institute for Verification of the Chemical Weapons Convention =

National disarmament authority for Finland

The Finnish Institute for Verification of the Chemical Weapons Convention (VERIFIN) is a Finnish institute carrying out several roles in support of chemical weapons disarmament.

Established in 1994 as a continuation of a research project started in 1973, it is located within the Chemistry Department of the Kumpula Campus of the University of Helsinki.

Funded by the Finnish Ministry for Foreign Affairs, its main task is to develop improved methods of verification of chemical weapons disarmament. The particular approach adopted is to refine analytical chemical techniques for identifying traces of chemical weapons, their precursors and their degradation products.

The institute is the National Authority for Finland under the Chemical Weapons Convention, carrying out many of the tasks required by the treaty such as preparing the Finnish Government declarations to the OPCW of inventories of controlled substances and escorting OPCW inspections of Finnish chemical production facilities. It is also one of the 18 OPCW designated laboratories worldwide for performing chemical weapons verification tests, a role it has performed since 1998.

The institute also runs several courses on chemical weapons verification for chemists from developing countries.

In 2014 VERIFIN was awarded The OPCW-The Hague Award in recognition of its outstanding leadership in the development of advanced verification methods for use in the detection and identification of chemical weapons and their components.
