= Mikro =

Mikro may refer to:

- Mikro (author), pseudonym of South African author Christoffel Hermanus Kühn (1903–1968)
- Mikro (Greek band), a Greek electronic music group formed in 1998
- Mikro (gastropod), a genus of sea snails

== See also ==
- Micro (disambiguation)
- Macro (disambiguation)
- Mikra (disambiguation)
