= Hurricane Marco (1996) =

Category 1 Atlantic hurricane in 1996

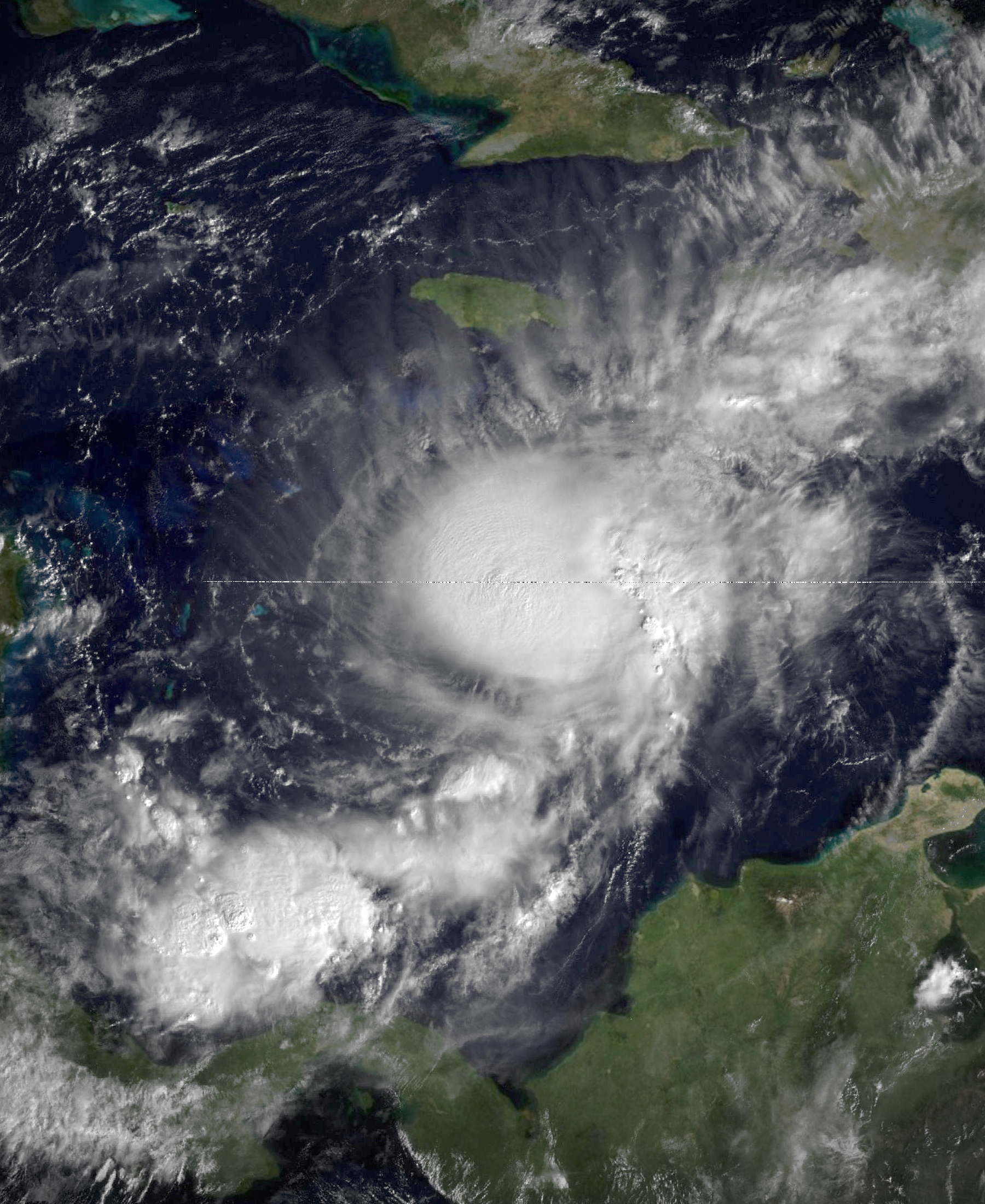
- Hurricane Marco near peak intensity south of Jamaica on November 20

Meteorological history
- Formed: November 16, 1996
- Dissipated: November 26, 1996

Category 1 hurricane
- 1-minute sustained (SSHWS/NWS)
- Highest winds: 75 mph (120 km/h)
- Lowest pressure: 983 mbar (hPa); 29.03 inHg

Overall effects
- Fatalities: 15 direct
- Damage: $8.2 million (1996 USD)
- Areas affected: Cuba, Hispaniola, Central America, Jamaica, and Florida
- IBTrACS
- Part of the 1996 Atlantic hurricane season

Hurricane Marco caused significant flooding in the Greater Antilles and Central America, despite remaining well offshore. The thirteenth tropical cyclone, thirteenth named storm, and ninth hurricane of the 1996 Atlantic hurricane season, Marco developed in the western Caribbean Sea on November 16 after the interaction of a cold front and several tropical waves. Initially a tropical depression, it remained weak as it tracked southwestward and eventually southward. By November 19, the depression strengthened into Tropical Storm Marco, shortly before slowly curving in a general eastward direction. Marco briefly became a hurricane on November 20, though upper-level winds caused it to weaken back to a tropical storm later that day. The storm then tracked northeastward toward Hispaniola, but later become nearly stationary and curve eastward, then doubled-back to the west.

After weakening to a tropical depression on November 23, Marco re-strengthened to a tropical storm on the following day. Marco tracked northwestward while fluctuating in intensity before finally weakening and dissipating on November 26. Despite not making landfall, Marco produced heavy rainfall in Cuba, Hispaniola, Central America, and Jamaica, which caused significant flooding in some areas. In Honduras, 4,000 homes were destroyed, 40 bridges washed away, nearly 50,000 acres of banana and fruit plantations flooded, and nine deaths were reported. Flooding also effected other Central American countries, albeit effects were less severe. Heavy rainfall was reported in Cuba, although flood damage is unknown. Marco contributed to an ongoing flood in Jamaica and caused three additional fatalities in the Dominican Republic. Overall, Marco caused 15 fatalities and approximately $8.2 million (1996 USD) in damage.

== Meteorological history ==
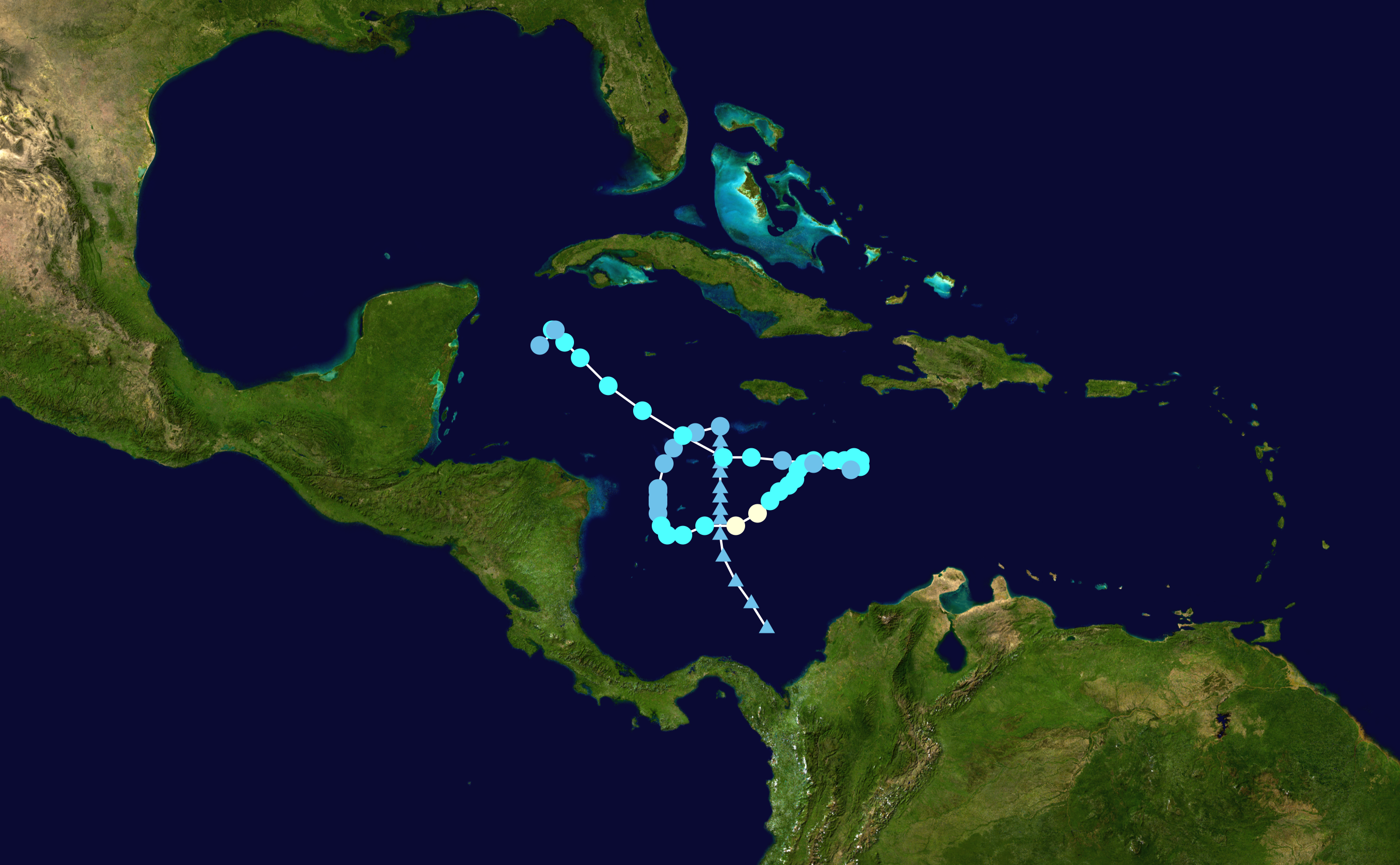
Map plotting the storm's track and intensity, according to the Saffir–Simpson scale Map key Saffir–Simpson scale Tropical depression (≤38 mph, ≤62 km/h) Tropical storm (39–73 mph, 63–118 km/h) Category 1 (74–95 mph, 119–153 km/h) Category 2 (96–110 mph, 154–177 km/h) Category 3 (111–129 mph, 178–208 km/h) Category 4 (130–156 mph, 209–251 km/h) Category 5 (≥157 mph, ≥252 km/h) Unknown Storm type Tropical cyclone Subtropical cyclone Extratropical cyclone, remnant low, tropical disturbance, or monsoon depression

On November 9, a cold front moved into the northwest Caribbean Sea, shortly before an abnormally strong high-pressure system entered in the area. The front then became nearly stationary and interacted with several tropical waves over the next week. The Intertropical Convergence Zone became active, causing monsoonal southwesterly flow to enter the system from the eastern Pacific Ocean. On November 13, surface weather analysis indicated a weak low-pressure area had developed north of Colombia. Despite a well-defined low-level circulation, the system did not meet the criteria for a tropical cyclone because convective activity was not organized or concentrated within the vicinity of the center. Several small, weak centers of low pressure formed in the general area, and the entire system drifted northward for a couple days. In combination with a high-pressure area over the United States, the system produced gale-force winds on Florida, Cuba, the Bahamas and the Gulf of Mexico.

Convection gradually developed over the broad low-pressure area, and post-storm analysis indicated that Tropical Depression Thirteen developed at 1800 UTC on November 16, while centered about 160 miles (260 km) southwest of Kingston, Jamaica. Operationally, the National Hurricane Center did not issue advisories until 2100 UTC on November 18. The depression tracked generally southward, soon encountering a more favorable environment for tropical cyclone development. Although environmental conditions were favorable for intensification, the depression initially failed to strengthen further. However, the depression later developed significant amounts of deep convection and intensified into Tropical Storm Marco on November 19. After intensifying into a tropical storm, Marco then headed slowly east-northeastward and continued to strengthen. By early on November 20, Marco was upgraded to a hurricane. Simultaneously, Marco attained its peak intensity with maximum sustained winds of 75 mph (120 km/h) and a minimum barometric pressure of 983 mbar (29.0 inHg).

However, shortly thereafter, Marco began to move into a less favorable environment with strong upper-level westerly winds. As a result, it weakened back to a tropical storm later on November 20, after being a hurricane for only twelve hours. Despite the lesser favorable environment, Marco began to re-strengthen starting on the following day. By November 22, it nearly re-gained hurricane status, with winds remaining at 70 mph (110 km/h). However, Marco subsequently weakened to a tropical depression at 1800 UTC on November 23 while south of Jamaica. A mid-level ridge rebuilt over the Bahamas and Florida, which forced Marco westward, and then northwestward. The cyclone re-organized and thus re-intensified into a tropical storm on November 24. Tropical Storm Marco reached a third peak intensity with winds at 60 mph (100 km/h) on November 25 at 1200 UTC, before it weakened again. The storm maintained tropical storm status until 1200 UTC on November 26, when it weakened to a tropical depression once again. Marco then interacted with a cold front, causing it to degenerate into a remnant low-pressure system at 1800 UTC on November 26. Three hours later, the National Hurricane Center issued its final advisory on Marco, stating that the storm was merely a low-level swirl devoid of deep convection. After dissipating, the remnants of Marco drifted southward and produced heavy rainfall over Belize and Honduras.

== Preparations ==
At 1500 UTC on November 19, a tropical storm watch was issued for Jamaica and was upgraded to a hurricane warning 24 hours later. However, by 2100 UTC on November 20, the hurricane warning was downgraded to a tropical storm warning. It was further downgraded to a tropical storm watch and discontinued by November 22. Other than hurricane/tropical storm watches and warnings, a flash flood warning was also posted on November 20, and sailors were advised to remain at port. Disaster committees cautioned residents to stock up on supplies such as batteries and canned food. At 1500 UTC on November 20, a hurricane watch was issued for Haiti and areas east of Camagüey, Cuba, though it was downgraded to a tropical storm watch six hours later. On the following day, the tropical storm watch was dropped. In addition, a tropical storm warning was issued on November 25 for the Isle of Youth and Pinar del Río, Cuba, though it was discontinued about 24 hours later.

== Impact ==
Although Hurricane Marco never made landfall, it was a large storm with an unusual and erratic path and as a result, caused heavy rainfall throughout Central America and the western Caribbean nations. In the Dominican Republic, three people drowned north of Santo Domingo, while 200 families fled their homes during the flooding. Marco also contributed to an ongoing flood in Jamaica, which had already caused a total of $3 million in damage to roads and left 170 families without shelter. After significant damage from Hurricane Lili in the previous month, minimal effects occurred in Cuba. Large amounts of precipitation also fell across Cuba, especially on the Isle of Youth and in Pinar del Río Province. Heavy rains caused thousands to flee their homes. However, damage in the country, if any is unknown.

Torrential rainfall in Honduras caused flooding, which forced 60,000 people from their homes. In addition, 4,000 homes were destroyed and 40 wooden bridges were washed away. Roads were significantly affected, with six roads and the national highway damaged in Cortés Department. Damage to the highway infrastructure totaled to approximately $500,000. Television broadcast images from La Lima showed houses submerged to their roofs. Flood waters also inundated nearly 50,000 acres of banana and fruit plantations owned by Chiquita Brands International. Other crops that sustained damage were maize, beans, sorghum, and rice. Agricultural losses associated with the storm totaled to approximately $7.7 million. Along the Caribbean coastline of Honduras, about 1,000 shanty houses were destroyed. Overall, Marco caused nine fatalities in the country. In the Pacific and northern regions of Nicaragua, numerous houses washed away in the floods. In addition, Nicaraguan civil defense authorities reported two fatalities. Further north in Guatemala, at least one death occurred, and flood waters damaged or destroyed hundreds of homes. Swollen rivers in Costa Rica flooded several towns and numerous banana plantations.

During its formative stage, a high-pressure area combined with the low pressure of Marco resulted in a tight pressure gradient which led to beach erosion and gale force winds on the Florida coast. In Broward, Miami-Dade, and Palm Beach counties, heavy surf generated by the combination of those systems caused 15 to 30 feet (4.6 to 9.1 m) of beach erosion. Additionally, 3 to 4 feet (0.91 to 1.22 m) of top sand were lost in that region. Further north, severe beach erosion caused the loss of as much as 10 feet (3.0 m) of the dune line in Brevard, Indian River, St. Lucie, and Martin counties. Other impact was minimal. Marco was one of few hurricanes to enter the Caribbean Sea and not make landfall. Also, Hurricane Hunter flights recorded volatile center structure with severe turbulence, extreme rainfall, and hail during a flight into the storm. Overall, Marco caused 14 fatalities and approximately $8.2 million in damage.

== Aftermath ==
While Marco was still spinning in the western Caribbean, the Government of Honduras allotted 70 million HNL ($5.6 million 1996 USD) in emergency assistance. Following the storm, several countries contributed cash toward the recovery of Honduras, including: Germany, Italy, the Netherlands, Norway, Spain, the United Kingdom, and the United States; cash donations collectively totaled slightly more than $438,000. In addition, the UN Department of Humanitarian Affairs contributed an emergency grant, worth $10,000. Japan donated 40 tents, 10 water purifiers, 480 soaps, and 3 emergency health kits in lieu of money. Norway donated almost $71,000 worth of food, medicines, and clothing. Spain also contributed medicine and transportation, costing $156,250. The United States donated plastic sheeting, water containers, and family food bags. The primary contributor of non-government aid was the Red Cross. After the storm, the Red Cross set up temporary shelters in San Pedro Sula, Puerto Cortés, and El Progreso. Additionally, they distributed 3,000 pounds of powdered milk, clothing, 500 sheets, chlorine boxes, 14,000 pounds of rice, 15,000 pounds of beans and 9,000 pounds of maize, sugar, and butter.

== See also ==
- Other storms of the same name
- List of notable tropical cyclones
- List of tropical cyclone names
