= Boshgaz =

Village in South Khorasan province, Iran

Boshgaz Persian: بشگز
- Village
- Location within Iran
- Coordinates: 32°50′41″N 59°41′43″E
- Country: Iran
- Province: South Khorasan
- County: Sarbisheh
- District: Mud
- Rural District: Mud

Population (2016)
  - Total: 362
- Time zone: UTC+3:30 (IRST)

Boshgaz (Persian: بشگز) (Note: Also romanized as Bāshgaz; also known as Bazqush and Bocgaz) is a village in Mud Rural District of Mud District in Sarbisheh County, South Khorasan province, Iran.

== Demographics ==
=== Population ===
At the time of the 2006 National Census, the village's population was 421 in 107 households. The following census in 2011 counted 415 people in 112 households. The 2016 census measured the population of the village as 362 people in 112 households.
