= Micro =

Micro may refer to:

== Measurement ==
- micro- (μ), a metric prefix denoting a factor of 10^{−6}

== Places ==
- Micro, North Carolina, town in U.S.

== People ==
- DJ Micro, (born Michael Marsicano) an American trance DJ and producer
- Chii Tomiya (都宮 ちい, born 1991), Japanese female professional wrestler, ring name Micro
- Micro, Nishimiya Yūki (born 1980), Japanese musician, member of the pop band Def Tech

== Arts, entertainment, and media ==
- Micro (comics), often known as Micro, a character in Marvel Comics
- Micro (novel), techno-thriller by Michael Crichton, published posthumously in 2011
- Micro (Thai band), a Thai rock band formed in 1983
- IEEE Micro, a peer-reviewed scientific journal
- International Symposium on Microarchitecture, an academic conference focus on microarchitecture
- Microdrama, short form web or television series
- Micromanagement (gameplay), the handling of detailed gameplay elements, such as individual units in realtime strategy games

== Brands and enterprises ==
- Micro Cars, Sri Lankan automobile company, established 1995
- Micro Center, an American computer department store, established 1979
- Micro ISV (mISV or μISV), a term for a small independent software vendor
- Micro Mobility Systems, Swiss company producing kickscooters

== Computing ==
- Micro, a mostly-obsolete term for a microcomputer, e.g.:
  - BBC Micro
- BBC Micro Bit, or micro:bit, an ARM-based embedded system for computer education
- MICRO Relational Database Management System, an early set-theoretic database management system
- Micro T-Kernel, μT-Kernel, a real-time operating system

== Other uses ==
- MICRO (organization), a non-profit organization
- Micro, type of bus transport in Lima, Peru
- AAA battery, known as a micro cell
- Micro kart, a one-passenger mini go-kart
- Game Boy Micro, a 2005 Nintendo handheld and the final model in the Game Boy line
- Microbrew, a beer from a small brewery

== See also ==
- Macro (disambiguation)
- Micromachinery
- Microstate
- Micros Systems
- Mikro (disambiguation)
- Mikra (disambiguation)
