= Mikra =

Mikra may refer to:

- Mikra, Thessaloniki, a town in the Thermi municipality, Greece
- Mikra, or Tanakh, the canonical collection of Jewish texts

== See also ==
- Micra (disambiguation)
- Mikro (disambiguation)
- Micro (disambiguation)
- Tanak (disambiguation)
- Anatolia, also known as Asia Minor (Μικρά Ἀσία, Mikrá Asía, 'small Asia')
