= Hurricane Marco (2020) =

Category 1 Atlantic hurricane

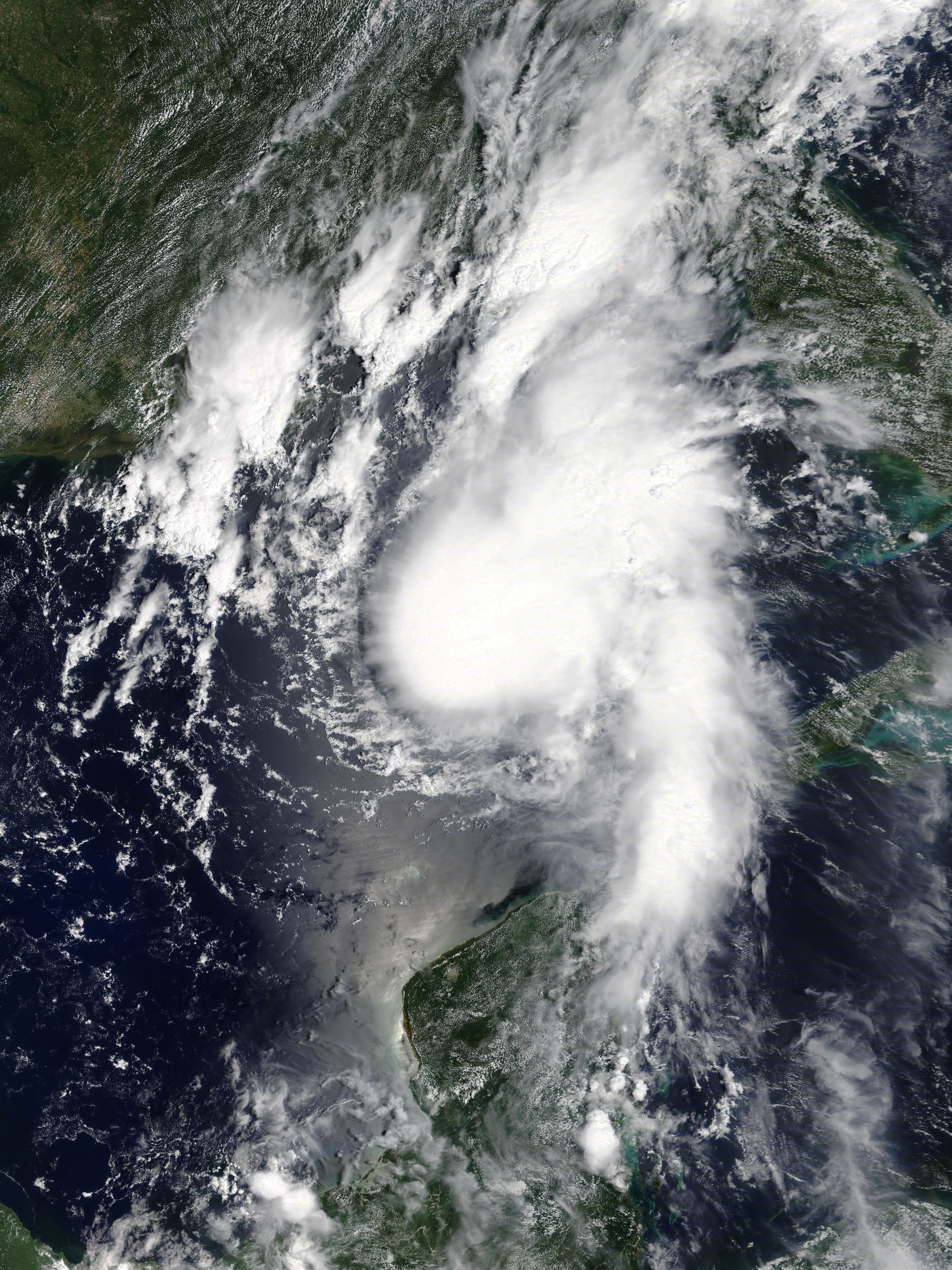
- Hurricane Marco approaching Louisiana at peak intensity on August 23

Meteorological history
- Formed: August 20, 2020
- Remnant low: August 25, 2020
- Dissipated: August 26, 2020

Category 1 hurricane
- 1-minute sustained (SSHWS/NWS)
- Highest winds: 75 mph (120 km/h)
- Lowest pressure: 991 mbar (hPa); 29.26 inHg

Overall effects
- Fatalities: None
- Damage: >$35 million (2020 USD)
- Areas affected: Central America, western Caribbean, Yucatán Peninsula, Gulf Coast of the United States
- IBTrACS /
- Part of the 2020 Atlantic hurricane season

Hurricane Marco was the first of two tropical cyclones to threaten the Gulf Coast of the United States within a three-day period. The thirteenth named storm and third hurricane of the record-breaking 2020 Atlantic hurricane season, Marco developed from a fast-moving tropical wave west of the Windward Islands and south of Jamaica on August 20. The fast motion of the wave inhibited intensification initially, but as the wave slowed down and entered a more favorable environment, the system developed into a tropical depression, which in turn rapidly intensified into a strong tropical storm. Due to strong wind shear, Marco's intensification temporarily halted. However, after entering the warm waters of the Gulf of Mexico on August 23, Marco briefly intensified into a hurricane, only to quickly weaken later that evening due to another rapid increase in wind shear. Marco subsequently weakened to a tropical depression before degenerating into a remnant low early the next morning. Marco's remnants subsequently dissipated on August 26.

Heavy rains across the Yucatán Peninsula caused river rises and flooding throughout the region. One person was indirectly killed in Tapachula, Mexico, due to the storm, although this was not included in the official death toll. Impacts in the United States were generally minor, as the storm was considerably weakened by the time it impacted the Gulf Coast. Marco did not make landfall, turning parallel to the U.S. coastline, unlike subsequent Hurricane Laura.

== Meteorological history ==
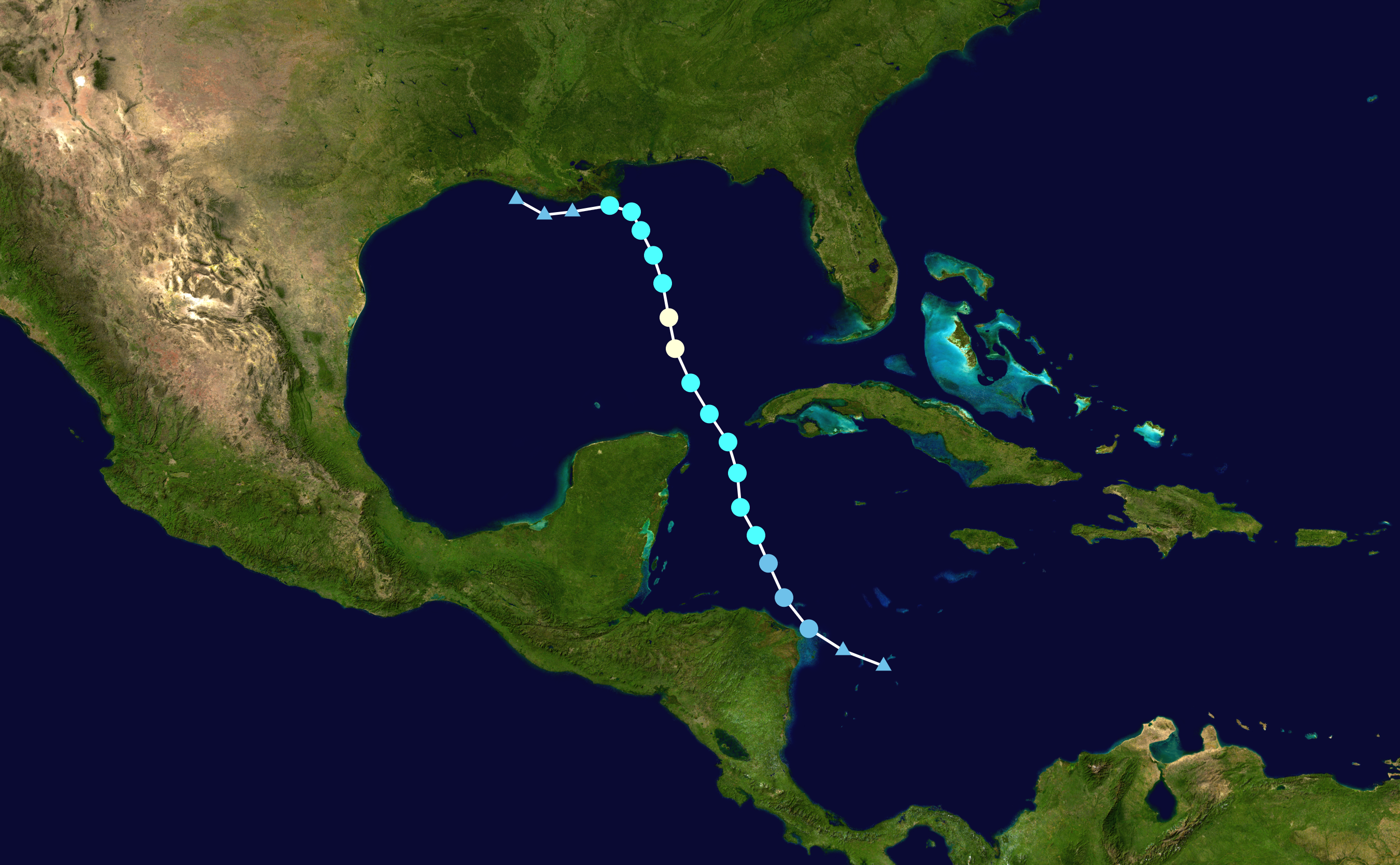
Map plotting the storm's track and intensity, according to the Saffir–Simpson scale Map key Saffir–Simpson scale Tropical depression (≤38 mph, ≤62 km/h) Tropical storm (39–73 mph, 63–118 km/h) Category 1 (74–95 mph, 119–153 km/h) Category 2 (96–110 mph, 154–177 km/h) Category 3 (111–129 mph, 178–208 km/h) Category 4 (130–156 mph, 209–251 km/h) Category 5 (≥157 mph, ≥252 km/h) Unknown Storm type Tropical cyclone Subtropical cyclone Extratropical cyclone, remnant low, tropical disturbance, or monsoon depression

At 00:00 UTC on August 16, the National Hurricane Center (NHC) began monitoring a westward-moving tropical wave over the Central Atlantic that had the potential for development. The disturbance quickly moved westward at a speed over 20 mph (32 km/h), which initially limited its development as it passed through the Windward Islands and into the Caribbean Sea. The system slowed down and gradually organized south of the Greater Antilles on August 19. By 15:00 UTC on August 20, satellite imagery revealed that the wave had developed a well-defined low-level center, prompting the NHC to designate it Tropical Depression Fourteen, forming after Tropical Depression Thirteen which would become Hurricane Laura. Post-storm analysis found that the system formed nine hours earlier at 06:00 UTC. At the time the system was located 235 miles (378 km) east of the Nicaragua–Honduras border. The storm continued westward toward Honduras, before making a sharp turn northward. Despite favorable conditions, the storm initially failed to intensify, with pulsing convection around a poorly defined center. Eventually, the storm's center became better defined and a small but persistent cluster of convection formed over it. This allowed the depression to intensify, and the NHC upgraded the system to Tropical Storm Marco in the northwest Caribbean at 00:00 UTC on August 22. This was the earliest 13th named storm ever recorded in the Atlantic basin, breaking the record set by Hurricane Maria of 2005 by 11 days.

Marco was able to strengthen quickly as a small system, reaching its initial peak intensity of 65 mph (100 km/h) and 992 mbar (29.29 inHg) just 18 hours after being named, with an almost closed eyewall being observed by Hurricane Hunters. Contrary to prior predictions, Marco's track was shifted eastward at the 21:00 UTC advisory on August 22, as the system moved north-northeastward instead of north-northwestward, introducing the possibility of successive landfalls around Louisiana from both Laura and Marco. An increase of southwesterly wind shear brought an abrupt end to the strengthening trend, as Marco moved through the Yucatán Channel, with the storm's minimum central pressure rising slightly and the eyewall mostly dissipating as the storm took on a sheared appearance. This weakening period proved to be short-lived, as the shear relaxed somewhat when Marco moved into the warm waters of the Gulf of Mexico on August 23. Slow but steady strengthening resumed and data from another Hurricane Hunter reconnaissance aircraft discovered sustained winds at hurricane strength in the northeastern eyewall. Marco strengthened into a Category 1 hurricane at 12:00 UTC on August 23, and simultaneously reached its peak intensity with 1-minute sustained winds of 75 mph (120 km/h) and a minimum central pressure of 991 mbar (29.26 inHg).

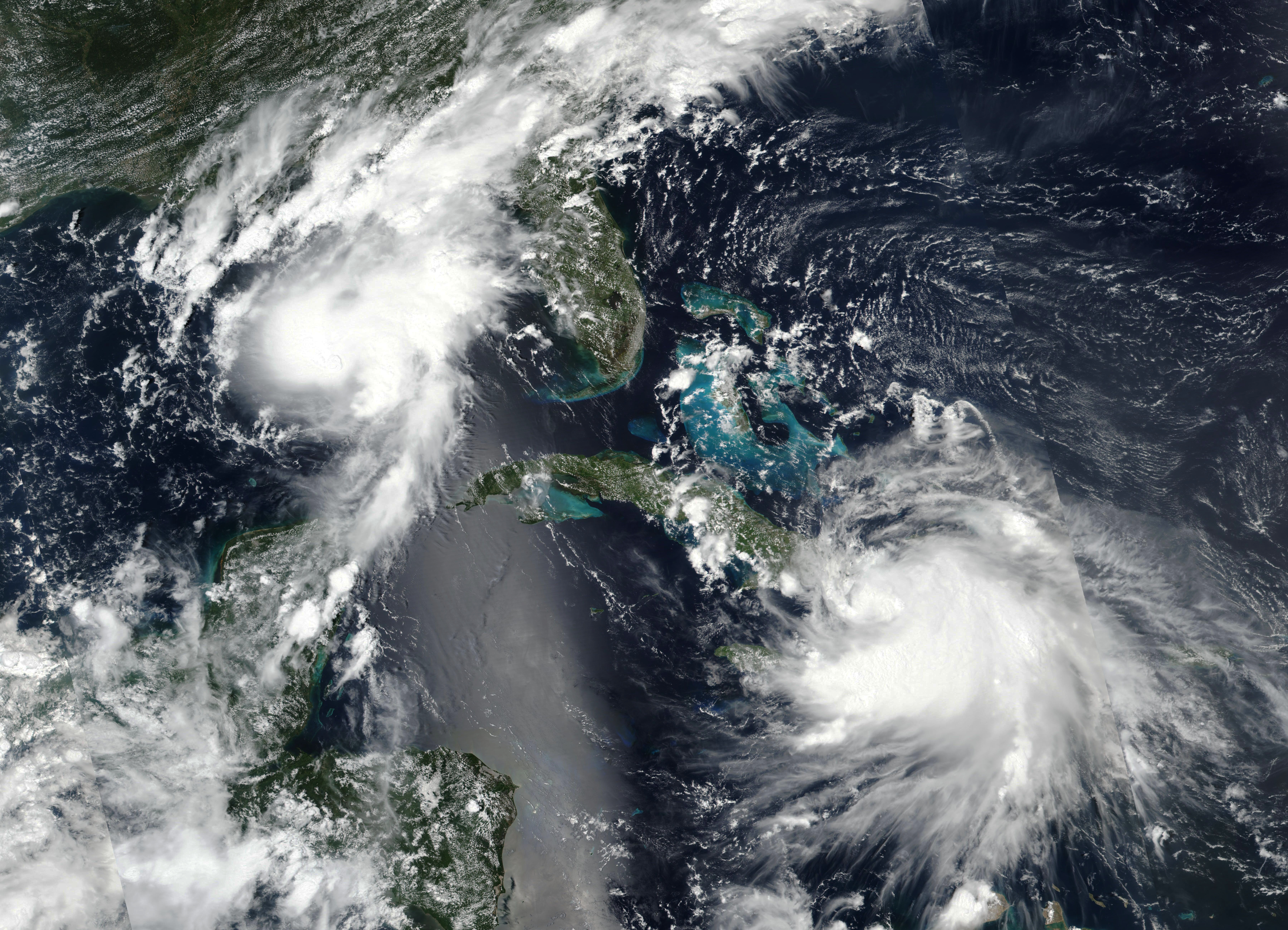
Hurricane Marco (left) and Tropical Storm Laura on August 23

This strengthening proved to be short-lived, however, as upper-level wind shear increased again over the storm. This caused Marco to weaken back to a tropical storm by 00:00 UTC on August 24, and the center of circulation became displaced from the storm's convection. Wind shear continued to plague the system as it turned westward near the Louisiana coastline, and Marco rapidly weakened to minimal tropical storm strength by 18:00 UTC. At 00:00 UTC on August 24, Marco passed just south of the mouth of the Mississippi River, with 1-minute sustained winds at 40 mph (65 km/h) and a central pressure of 1,006 mbar (29.71 inHg), although the strongest winds were displaced in convection that was over waters well northeast of the storm's center. Operationally, the NHC said that the storm made landfall here, but that was changed in post-storm analysis because of data from weather stations in Southwest Pass indicating that Marco stayed offshore. Afterward, Marco weakened further and fell to tropical depression intensity just offshore of Louisiana, near Grand Isle, at 03:00 UTC on August 25, before degenerating into a remnant low three hours later. The remnant low continued to spin down as it slowly moved westward along the Louisiana coastline, ahead of the approaching Hurricane Laura, before opening up into a trough at 00:00 UTC on the next day.

== Preparations ==
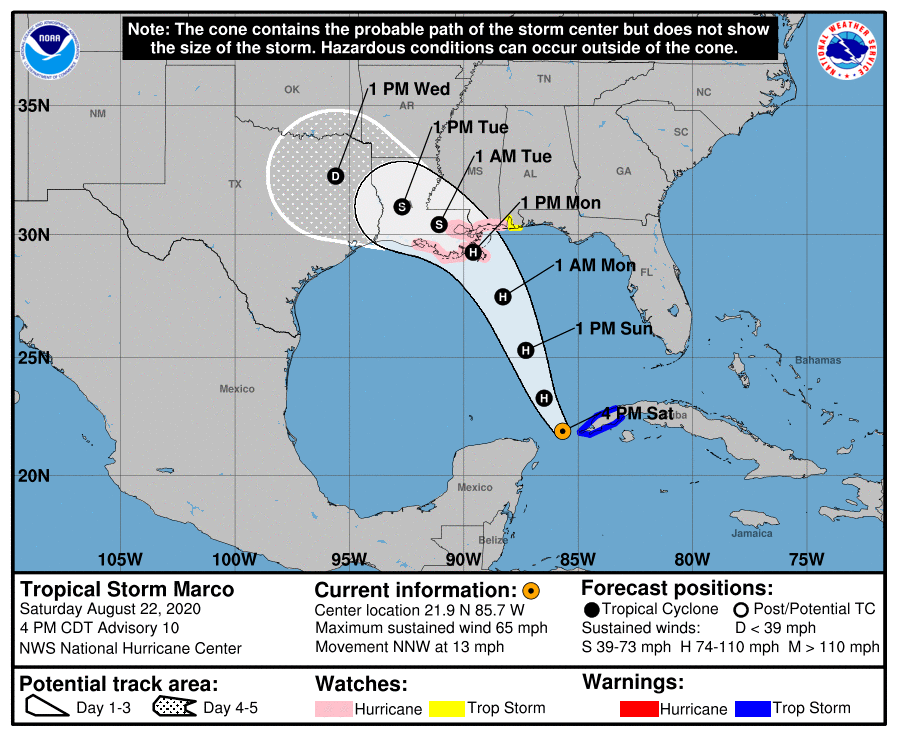
Hurricane Marco's predicted path released by the National Hurricane Center on August 22

Honduras issued tropical storm watches along its coastline when Tropical Depression Fourteen was designated, before quickly upgrading to warnings hours later. Tropical Storm Watches, and later Tropical Storm Warnings and Hurricane Watches, were also issued for the eastern side of the Yucatán Peninsula, as the storm was first predicted to move over the peninsula as a strong tropical storm. When Marco moved to the north instead of northwest, a Tropical Storm Warning was issued by the Government of Cuba for the Pinar del Río Province and the Isle of Youth.

Tropical Storm, Hurricane, and Storm Surge Watches were issued in Louisiana, Mississippi, and Alabama when Marco's forecast track shifted significantly eastward on August 22. Many of these watches were upgraded to warnings as the storm continued its approach. In the state of Texas, the Padre Island National Seashore closed on August 22 in preparation for the hurricane. In Mississippi, mandatory evacuation orders were in place on August 23 at the Gulfport and Biloxi marinas and the harbor in Long Beach. All boats were ordered to be moved by sundown that same day. In Gulfport, the fuel dock was closed. However, all the warnings were eventually downgraded and canceled when the storm rapidly weakened as it approached the coast. Six hundred additional resources from were requested from Alabama Power, Georgia Power, and other power crews to help restoration efforts. A tornado watch was issued for southeast Alabama, the Florida Panhandle, Southwest Georgia, and United States coastal waters at 20:40 UTC on August 24.

== Impacts ==
Radar image of Tropical Storm Marco passing south of the mouth of the Mississippi River on August 24

=== Central America, Mexico, and Cuba ===
The Instituto Meteorológico Nacional of Costa Rica reported that heavy rain from the indirect effects of Marco affected parts of the country for three days. In Santa Cruz, Guanacaste Province, accumulations reached 17.0 in (431 mm), more than twice the average August rainfall of 9.1 in (231 mm). Areas in and around Santa Cruz reported flooding.

In Mexico, an indirect death occurred in Tapachula, Chiapas. Despite this, the NHC did not attribute Marco to any deaths in their post-storm report. Rainfall totals were as high as 186.4 millimeters (18.64 cm), with the states Veracruz, Oaxaca, and Chiapas worst affected by heavy rains. In some municipalities of Chiapas, such as Tapachula, Escuintla and Acacoyagua, growth of rivers from nearby mountains led to flooding. Losses in Mexico and Costa Rica were estimated by Aon to be in the "tens of millions" (USD).

While traversing the Yucatán Channel, Marco brought heavy rain to parts of Pinar del Río Province in Cuba on August 23. The town of Isabel Rubio saw the greatest accumulations at 3.8 in (97 mm) of rainfall. Minor flooding occurred in Mantua and Sandino. A few trees were uprooted during the storm.

=== United States ===
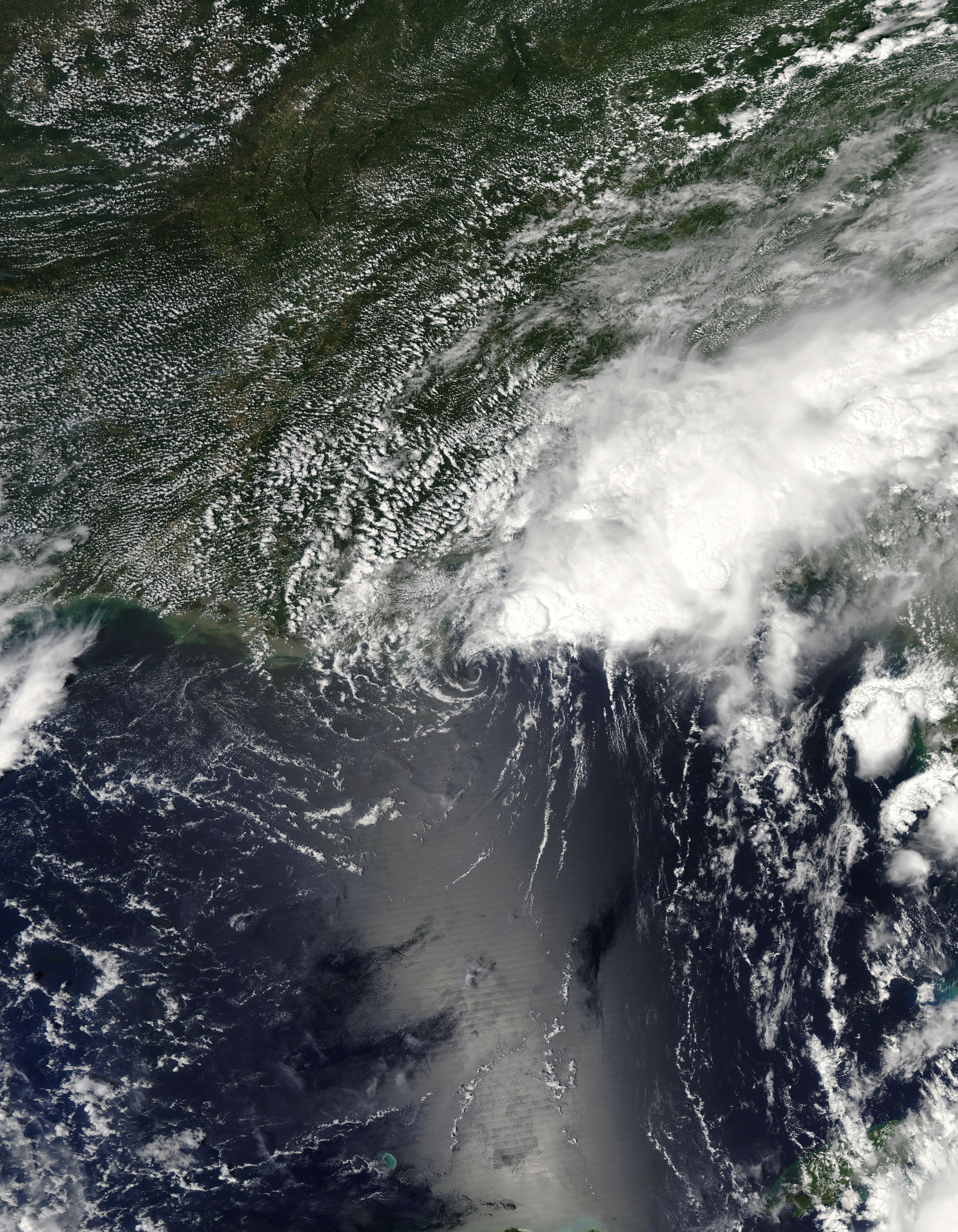
A weakening Tropical Storm Marco passing just south of the coast of Louisiana on August 24

Due to the sheared nature of the storm as it passed just offshore of the United States, rain bands extended as far northeast as Virginia. A tornado warning was issued for a storm just northeast of Panama City, Florida. Another tornado warning was issued for a storm near Charleston, South Carolina. Numerous special marine warnings were also issued due to possible waterspouts. However, no tornadoes nor waterspouts were confirmed. Rainfall totals were highest along the Florida Panhandle, peaking at 13.17 inches (335 mm) near Apalachicola on Monday morning. Several roadways and a hotel were flooded in Panama City Beach that evening as well. Heavy rainfall extended much further inland with flash flood warnings being issued as far northeast as the North Carolina—Virginia border. Due to Marco being much weaker than anticipated, no wind damage occurred and the peak wind gust from the storm was only 38 mph (61 km/h), which was recorded in Petit Bois Island, Mississippi. The remnants of the storm brought heavy rainfall and flash flooding to Southeastern Oklahoma on August 26 before dissipating. Overall, Marco caused at least $25 million USD in insured losses throughout the impacted areas, as estimated by Aon.

== See also ==
- Tropical cyclones in 2020
- Other storms of the same name
- List of Category 1 Atlantic hurricanes
- Tropical Storm Arlene (2005) – a similar storm that affected similar areas
- Hurricane Cindy (2005) – a storm that had a similar track
- Hurricane Nate (2017) – also caused flooding in Central America and Cuba
- Tropical Storm Alberto (2018) – a storm that affected similar areas
- Hurricane Rafael (2024) – stronger hurricane that took a similar track and also dissipated in the Gulf of Mexico without making landfall along its coastline
