= Chumash =

Chumash may refer to:

- Chumash (Judaism), a Hebrew word for the Pentateuch, used in Judaism
- Chumash people, a Native American people of southern California
- Chumashan languages, Indigenous languages of California

== See also ==
- Pentateuch (disambiguation)
- Torah (disambiguation)
- Tanak (disambiguation)
- Chumash traditional narratives
- Chumash Painted Cave State Historic Park in California
- Chumash Wilderness, a wilderness area California
- Chuvash (disambiguation)
