= Mirka =

Mirka may refer to:

- Mirka (film), a 2000 drama
- Mirka (name), a feminine given name
- Mirka-class frigate of the Soviet Navy
- Mirka, Jenin, a Palestinian village
