= Çuvaş =

- Village
- Location within Azerbaijan
- Coordinates: 38°36′N 48°45′E
- Country: Azerbaijan
- Rayon: Astara
- Municipality: Rinə
- Time zone: UTC+4 (AZT)
  - Summer (DST): UTC+5 (AZT)

Çuvaş (also, Çüvaş, Chuash, and Chuvash) is a village in the Astara Rayon of Azerbaijan. The village forms part of the municipality of Rinə. The etymology of the name Çuvaş is believed to be derived from the Chuvash people, an ethnic group inhabiting the Chuvash Republic of European Russia.
