= OPCW–The Hague Award =

Award for contributions to anti-chemical weapon efforts

The OPCW–The Hague Award is an annual award founded by the OPCW as a result of their being presented with the 2013 Nobel Peace Prize. The purpose of the Award is to honour and recognize individuals and institutions that have significantly contributed towards the goal of a world free of chemical weapons.

== Foundation ==
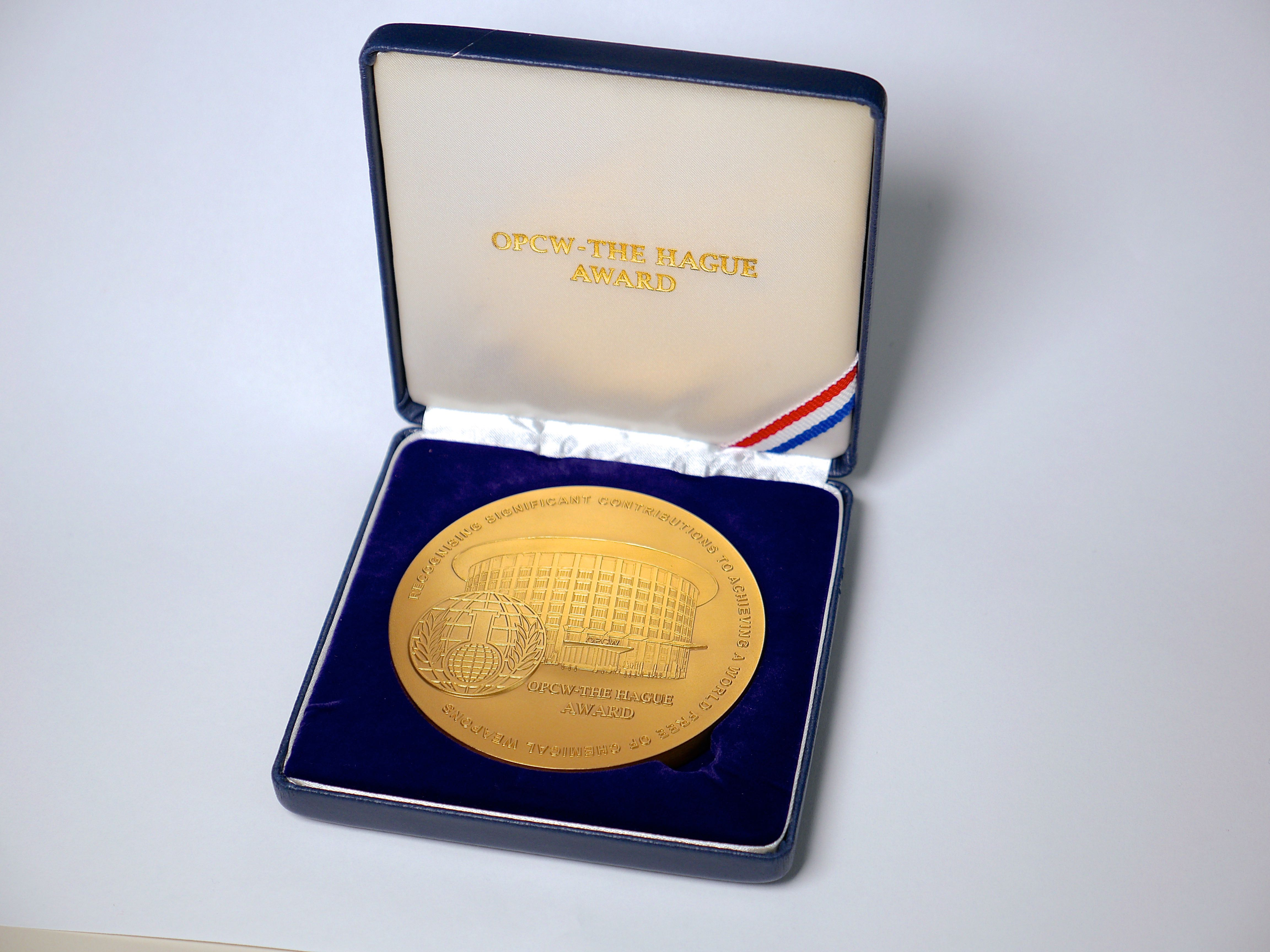
Commemorative Medal depicting the OPCW headquarters in The Hague.

In 2014, the Organisation for the Prohibition of Chemical Weapons (OPCW) established the OPCW–The Hague Award to honour select individuals and institutions by highlighting their exceptional contributions towards the goal of a world permanently free of chemical weapons. The award was created as a legacy of the OPCW winning the 2013 Nobel Peace Prize for their "extensive work to eliminate chemical weapons". The OPCW—The Hague Award Fund was created using the approximately €900,000 monetary prize which accompanied the Nobel Peace Prize, and is also supported financially by the City of The Hague, where the OPCW is based.

The winner of the Award is presented with a medal, certificate and a monetary prize of up to €90,000. As an essential partner in both establishing and maintaining the Award, the commemorative medal features an engraving of the OPCW headquarters building with the official coat of arms of the City of The Hague au verso. This reflects The Hague's stature as the international city of peace and justice, and its historic support of the OPCW mission statement; a ban on chemical weapons has been in effect in the Netherlands since the Hague Convention of 1899.

== Past winners ==
The roster of past winners includes experts in analytical chemistry techniques, medical toxicology, the ethical use of chemistry, and the legal frameworks governing the elimination of all chemical weapons.

=== 2014 winners ===
In its first edition, the Award was presented to Dr Robert Mathews of the Commonwealth of Australia, and also to the organisation VERIFIN of the Republic of Finland.

- Dr Robert Mathews

Dr Robert Mathews previously lead the Nuclear, Biological and Chemical Arms Control Unit in the Australian Defence Science and Technology Organisation (DSTO), which he founded in 1974. Through his work Dr Mathews has contributed greatly to the OPCW since its formation in 1997, and has provided invaluable expertise in both the disarmament of chemical weapons, and the advancement of innovative protective counter-measures against their use.

- VERIFIN

VERIFIN (the Finnish Institute for Verification of the Chemical Weapons Convention) operates as part of the Department of Science at the University of Helsinki, and was founded in 1994. VERIFIN has served as the National Authority of Finland since 1998, as defined under Article VII of the Chemical Weapons Convention. As such, VERIFIN works closely with the main body of the OPCW and has provided considerable assistance through the development of advanced verification methods for use in the detection and identification of chemical weapons and their components; most recently used during the investigation into the alleged use of chemical weapons in the Syrian Arab Republic.

=== 2015 winners ===
In 2015, the Award was presented to Dr Mahdi Balali-Mood of the Islamic Republic of Iran, and Dr Alastair Hay of the United Kingdom.

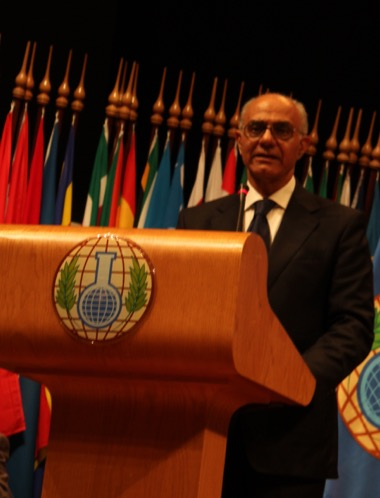
Balali-Mood

- Dr Mahdi Balali-Mood

Dr Mahdi Balali-Mood, a leading authority in medical toxicology, was presented with The OPCW–The Hague Award due to his outstanding work in treating the victims of chemical weapon use; most prominently during the 1980–1988 Iran-Iraq War. His wealth of experience in the field lead to the establishment of his own clinic in the aftermath of the war to provide care for victims affected by the long term consequences of surviving exposure to chemical weapons.

- Dr Alastair Hay

Dr Alastair Hay a preeminent expert in the field of occupational health and toxicology, and in this capacity he has participated in numerous missions to investigate alleged uses of chemical weapons. His training courses for doctors and OPCW inspectors working in Syria have aided them in better understanding the long-term health effects of exposure to chemical weapons, and establishing more effective protocols for the treatment of victims. Dr Hay is also a leading figure in international efforts to advocate the peaceful applications of chemistry and biology.

=== 2017 Winners ===
- African Centre for the Study and Research on Terrorism (ACSRT)
- International Master Courses in Protection Against CBRNe Events

=== 2019 Winners ===
- Robert Mikulak
- Cheng Tang
- International Union of Pure and Applied Chemistry

=== 2022 Winners ===
- Special Risks Brigade of the Federal Police of Argentina
- Chemical Weapons Convention Coalition
- Population Protection Institute, Fire Rescue Service of the Czech Republic

== See also ==
- List of chemistry awards
