= Micra (disambiguation) =

Micra is a car produced by Nissan.

Micra may also refer to:

- Medical Injury Compensation Reform Act, the California medical malpractice liability insurance act
- Micra (moth), a moth genus also known as Eublemma
- Micra (unit), the plural form of the old length unit "micron"
- M.I.C.R.A.: Mind Controlled Remote Automaton, unfinished comic series

== See also ==
- Mikra (disambiguation)
