= Rinə =

- Municipality
- Location within Azerbaijan
- Coordinates: 38°35′25″N 48°46′04″E
- Country: Azerbaijan
- Rayon: Astara

Population
  - Total: 925
- Time zone: UTC+4 (AZT)
  - Summer (DST): UTC+5 (AZT)

Rinə (also, Reyna) is a village and municipality in the Astara Rayon of Azerbaijan. It has a population of 925. The municipality consists of the villages of Rinə, Vıləşə, Taxtakəran, and Çuvaş.
