= List of storms named Marco =

The name Marco has been used for four tropical cyclones in the Atlantic Ocean:

- Tropical Storm Marco (1990) – hugged west coast of Florida, making landfall as a tropical depression, causing heavy rain and moderate damage
- Hurricane Marco (1996) – a Category 1 hurricane that formed in the Caribbean Sea and, while never making landfall, was large enough to drop heavy rain on Central America and Hispaniola, causing flooding and mudslides that killed eight
- Tropical Storm Marco (2008) – smallest tropical cyclone (radius of winds from center) on record that rapidly formed in the Bay of Campeche
- Hurricane Marco (2020) – a minimal Category 1 hurricane that formed in the central Caribbean and subsequently weakened to a tropical depression before degenerating into a remnant low in the northern Gulf of Mexico

== See also ==
- Cyclone Marcus (2018) – an Australian region tropical cyclone with a similar name
