= Mid-Atlantic Regional Council on the Ocean =

- Abbreviation: MARCO
- Formation: 2009
- Type: Intergovernmental organization
- Purpose: To maintain and improve the health of the Atlantic Ocean and coastal resources, and ensure that they continue to contribute to the high quality of life and economic vitality of the Mid-Atlantic region's communities well into the future.
- Headquarters: (none)
- Members: New York, New Jersey, Delaware, Maryland, Virginia
- Website: Mid-Atlantic Regional Council on the Ocean

Mid-Atlantic Regional Council on the Ocean is a regional initiative by states in the Mid-Atlantic States region "to maintain and improve the health of our ocean and coastal resources, and ensure that they continue to contribute to the high quality of life and economic vitality of our region's communities well into the future." Five states currently participate in the initiative.

== History ==
In 2009, Governors David Paterson, Martin O'Malley, Jon Corzine, Jack Markell, and Tim Kaine joined to form the Mid-Atlantic Regional Council on the Ocean. The initiative was announced on June 4, 2009, by Governors Corzine and Paterson at "a well attended NY City press conference" which they noted as an "'historic' 'Mid Atlantic Governor's Agreement on Ocean Conservation' among the 5 mid-Atlantic states: NY, NJ, Delaware, Maryland, and Virginia" Media coverage of the press conference noted that the governors "committed to encouraging wind energy developments in appropriate offshore areas, improving coordination for projects in each other's and federal jurisdictions, and pushing for federal investment in wastewater infrastructure to protect beaches and fisheries."

The Baltimore Sun quoted Maryland Governor Martin O'Malley as noting "Working together, we can and will ensure that the ocean resources for which we share responsibility remain healthy, resilient and productive for our children and theirs."

Sarah Chasis, Senior Attorney and Director, Ocean Initiative, New York of the Natural Resources Defense Council noted in a blog posting that with the initiative "the Mid-Atlantic jumps to being a regional player on the ocean protection scene, on par with ecosystem-wide efforts by bodies like the West Coast Governors' Agreement."
