= Morrinhos, Ceará =

Municipality in Ceará, Brazil

Coordinates: 3°13′44″S 40°07′30″W

- Municipality
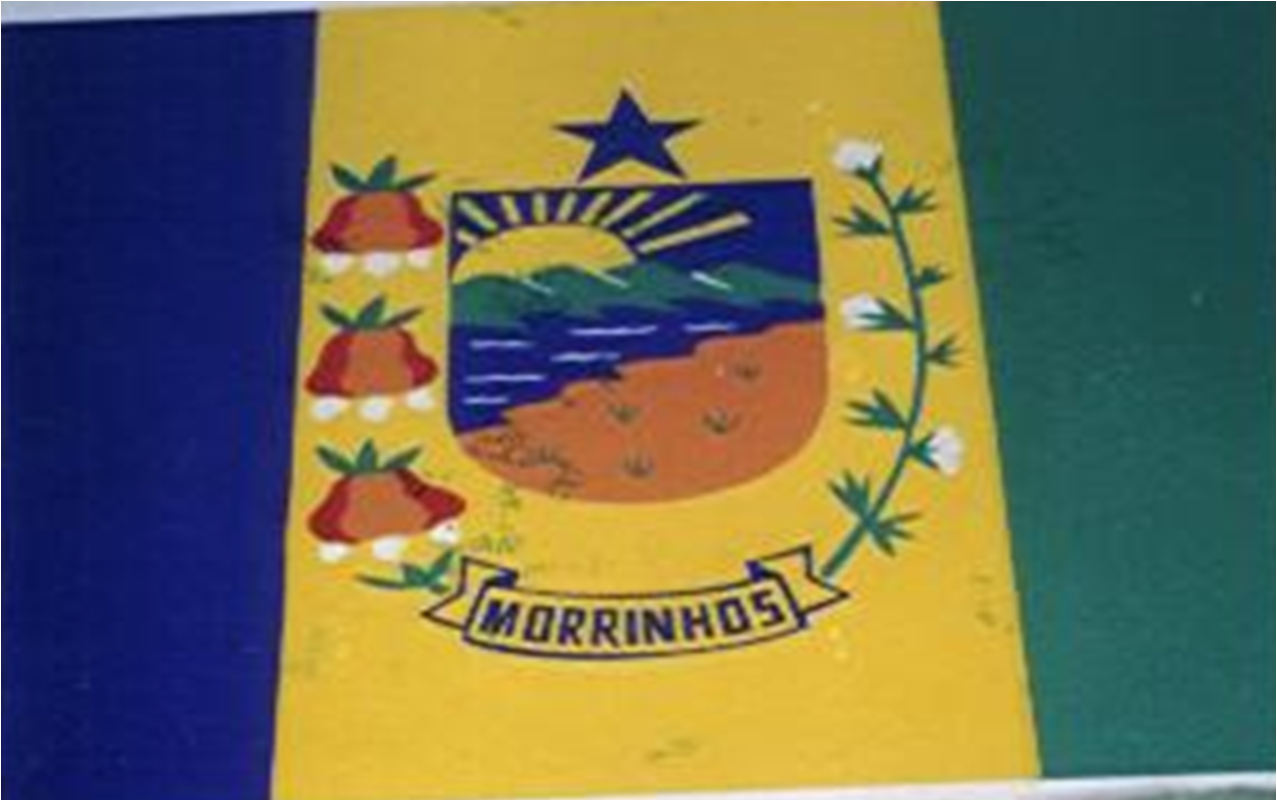
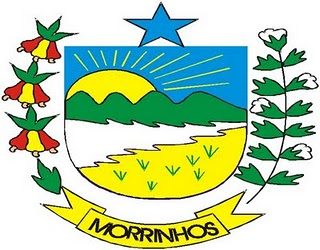
- Flag Coat of arms
- Interactive map of Morrinhos, Ceará
- Country: Brazil
- Region: Nordeste
- State: Ceará
- Mesoregion: Noroeste Cearense

Population (2020)
  - Total: 22,685
- Time zone: UTC−3 (BRT)

Morrinhos, Ceará is a municipality in the state of Ceará in the Northeast region of Brazil.

== See also ==
- List of municipalities in Ceará
