= Naharjan Rural District =

Rural district in South Khorasan province, Iran

Naharjan Rural District Persian: دهستان نهارجان
- Rural District
- Location within Iran
- Coordinates: 32°27′N 59°27′E
- Country: Iran
- Province: South Khorasan
- County: Sarbisheh
- District: Mud
- Established: 1987
- Capital: Kalateh-ye Soleyman

Population (2016)
  - Total: 4,380
- Time zone: UTC+3:30 (IRST)

Naharjan Rural District (Persian: دهستان نهارجان) is in Mud District of Sarbisheh County, South Khorasan province, Iran. Its capital is the village of Kalateh-ye Soleyman.

== Demographics ==
=== Population ===
At the time of the 2006 National Census, the rural district's population was 4,949 in 1,476 households. There were 4,775 inhabitants in 1,584 households at the following census of 2011. The 2016 census measured the population of the rural district as 4,380 in 1,444 households. The most populous of its 78 villages was Chenesht, with 1,157 people.

=== Other villages in the rural district ===
- Asfij
- Fal
- Gaz
- Mian Rud
- Mokhtaran
- Razq
- Zeydar
