= Mud Rural District =

Rural district in South Khorasan province, Iran

Mud Rural District Persian: دهستان مود
- Rural District
- Location within Iran
- Coordinates: 32°46′N 59°35′E
- Country: Iran
- Province: South Khorasan
- County: Sarbisheh
- District: Mud
- Established: 1987
- Capital: Mud

Population (2016)
  - Total: 4,180
- Time zone: UTC+3:30 (IRST)

Mud Rural District (Persian: دهستان مود) is in Mud District of Sarbisheh County, South Khorasan province, Iran. It is administered from the city of Mud.

== Demographics ==
=== Population ===
At the time of the 2006 National Census, the rural district's population was 4,403 in 1,346 households. There were 4,238 inhabitants in 1,370 households at the following census of 2011. The 2016 census measured the population of the rural district as 4,180 in 1,440 households. The most populous of its 43 villages was Esfezar, with 394 people.

=== Other villages in the rural district ===
- Bizhaem
- Boshgaz
- Fanud
- Hajjiabad
- Karimabad
- Shavakand
