= Mud District =

District in South Khorasan province, Iran

Mud District Persian: بخش مود
- District
- Location within Iran
- Coordinates: 32°36′N 59°30′E
- Country: Iran
- Province: South Khorasan
- County: Sarbisheh
- Established: 2003
- Capital: Mud

Population (2016)
  - Total: 12,037
- Time zone: UTC+3:30 (IRST)

Mud District (Persian: بخش مود) is in Sarbisheh County, South Khorasan province, Iran. Its capital is the city of Mud.

== Demographics ==
=== Population ===
At the time of the 2006 National Census, the district's population was 11,803 in 3,517 households. The following census in 2011 counted 12,080 people in 3,864 households. The 2016 census measured the population of the district as 12,037 inhabitants in 3,945 households.

=== Administrative divisions ===
Mud District Population
Administrative Divisions	2006	2011	2016
Mud RD	4,403	4,238	4,180
Naharjan RD	4,949	4,775	4,380
Mud (city)	2,451	3,067	3,477
Total	11,803	12,080	12,037
RD = Rural District
