= Thornville, Queensland =

Thornville
- Suburb
- Interactive map of Thornville
- Coordinates: 27.0719°S 151.8316°E
- Country: Australia
- State: Queensland
- LGA: Toowoomba Region
- Location: 29.5 km (18.3 mi) ENE of Quinalow; 35.2 km (21.9 mi) NW of Crows Nest; 63.3 km (39.3 mi) N of Oakey; 78.9 km (49.0 mi) NNW of Toowoomba; 186 km (116 mi) NW of Brisbane

Government
  - State electorate: Nanango
  - Federal division: Maranoa

Area
  - Total: 44.8 km^{2} (17.3 sq mi)

Population
  - Total: 39 (2021 census)
  - Density: 0.871/km^{2} (2.255/sq mi)
- Time zone: UTC+10:00 (AEST)
- Postcode: 4352
Suburbs around Thornville
Wutul	Wutul	East Cooyar
Nutgrove	Thornville	St Aubyn
Highgrove	Coalbank	Coalbank

Thornville is a rural locality in the Toowoomba Region, Queensland, Australia. In the 2021 census, Thornville had a population of 39 people.

== Geography ==
The Great Dividing Range forms part of the south-western boundary of the locality. Being east of the range, the locality is within the North East Coast drainage division, where all rivers and creeks flow ultimately into the Coral Sea.

The New England Highway enters the locality from the north (Wutul) and exits to the east (St Aubyn).

Upper Coalbank is a mountain in the south of the locality (27.0980°S 151.8109°E), rising to 729 metres (2,392 ft) above sea level.

The land use is grazing on native vegetation with a small amount of crop growing.

== History ==
Thornville State School opened on 3 May 1909. In 1920, local people wanted an extension to the school as the school building was 24 by 16 feet (7.3 m × 4.9 m) despite having 48 children enrolled. It closed on 7 February 1975. It was at 3847 New England Highway (27.0597°S 151.8392°E).

Thornville Methodist Church was opened on Saturday 14 April 1917 by Littleton Groom, the federal member for Darling Downs. The timber church was built by the Fitch Brothers and could seat 80 people. In 1977, it become the Thornville Uniting Church, when the Methodist Church of Australasia became part of the Uniting Church in Australia.

== Demographics ==
In the 2016 census, Thornville had a population of 26 people.

In the 2021 census, Thornville had a population of 39 people.

== Education ==
There are no schools in Thornville. The nearest government primary schools are Cooyar State School in Cooyar to the north and Kulpi State School in Kulpi to the south-west. The nearest government secondary schools are Quinalow State School (to Year 10) in Quinalow to the south-west and Crow's Nest State School (to Year 10) in Crows Nest to the south-east. The nearest government secondary school providing education to Year 12 is Oakey State High School in Oakey to the south, but it would be too distant for some students in Thornville for a daily commute with the alternatives being distance education and boarding school.

== Amenities ==
Thornville Uniting Church is at 3726 New England Highway (27.05715°S 151.82655°E).
