= Narko, Queensland =

Narko
- Suburb
- Interactive map of Narko
- Coordinates: 27.1038°S 151.715°E
- Country: Australia
- State: Queensland
- LGA: Toowoomba Region
- Location: 48.3 km (30.0 mi) N of Oakey; 74.4 km (46.2 mi) NNW of Toowoomba; 204 km (127 mi) WNW of Brisbane

Government
  - State electorate: Nanango
  - Federal division: Groom

Area
  - Total: 36.0 km^{2} (13.9 sq mi)

Population
  - Total: 16 (2021 census)
  - Density: 0.444/km^{2} (1.15/sq mi)
- Time zone: UTC+10:00 (AEST)
- Postcode: 4352
Suburbs around Narko
Maclagan	Maclagan	Nutgrove
Woodleigh; Maclagan	Narko	Highgrove
Peranga	Peranga	Evergreen

Narko is a rural locality in the Toowoomba Region, Queensland, Australia. In the 2021 census, Narko had a population of 16 people.

== Geography ==
The Great Dividing Range passes through the north-east of the locality with elevations up to 700 metres (2,300 ft).

Cockatoo Creek rises in the north of the locality (just west of the range) and flows south through the locality, exiting to Peranga to the south.

The land use is most grazing on native vegetation with some crop growing.

== History ==
The locality takes its name from a former railway station, named on 9 January 1915 by the Queensland Railways Department using an Aboriginal word meaning good soil.

Cockatoo Creek Provisional School opened on 1 July 1908 under head teacher Edward Laurence Stinson. On 1 January 1909, it became Cockatoo Creek State School. In 1913, it was renamed Narko State School. It closed on 11 July 1937. The school was on a 5-acre (2.0 ha) site at 468 Peranga Narko Road (27.11340°S 151.71125°E).

The Cooyar railway line opened on 28 April 1913. It connected the towns of Oakey and Cooyar via Narko. The line was closed beyond Acland on 1 May 1964, ceasing services to Narko. The locality was served by two railway stations:

- Muntapa railway station in the north-east of the locality (27.0844°S 151.7408°E)
- Narko railway station in the south of the locality (27.11084°S 151.71164°E)

== Demographics ==
In the 2016 census, Narko had a population of 18 people.

In the 2021 census, Narko had a population of 16 people.

== Education ==
There are no schools in Narko. The nearest government primary schools are Quinalow State School in Quinalow to the west, Kulpi State School in Kulpi to the south, and Cooyar State School in Cooyar to the north-east.

The nearest government secondary schools are Quinalow State School (to Year 10) and Oakey State High School (to Year 12) in Oakey to the south.
