= Highgrove, Queensland =

Highgrove
- Suburb
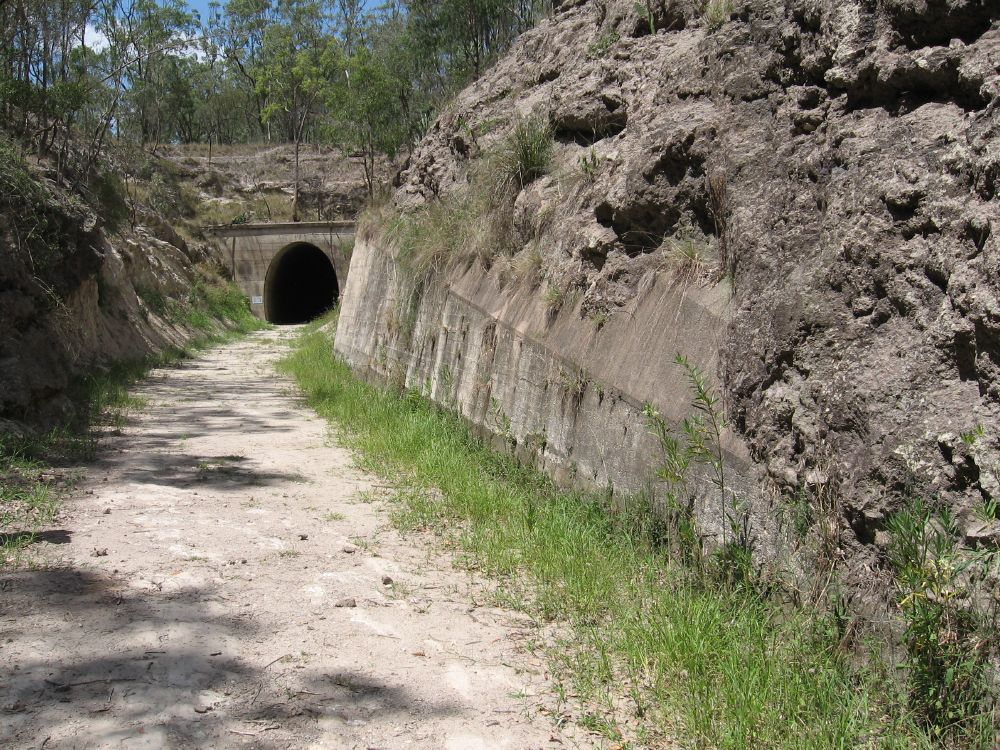
- Muntapa Tunnel, 2006

- Interactive map of Highgrove
- Coordinates: 27.1088°S 151.7675°E
- Country: Australia
- State: Queensland
- LGA: Toowoomba Region
- Location: 19.6 km (12.2 mi) E of Quinalow; 41.9 km (26.0 mi) N of Oakey; 67.9 km (42.2 mi) NNW of Toowoomba CBD; 197 km (122 mi) WNW of Brisbane

Government
  - State electorate: Nanango
  - Federal division: Groom

Area
  - Total: 26.3 km^{2} (10.2 sq mi)

Population
  - Total: 28 (2021 census)
  - Density: 1.065/km^{2} (2.76/sq mi)
- Time zone: UTC+10:00 (AEST)
- Postcode: 4352
Suburbs around Highgrove
| Narko | Nutgrove | Thornville |
| Narko | Highgrove | Coalbank |
| Evergreen | Doctor Creek | Doctor Creek |

Highgrove is a rural locality in the Toowoomba Region, Queensland, Australia. In the 2021 census, Highgrove had a population of 28 people.

== Geography ==
The ridgeline of the Great Dividing Range roughly bounds the locality to the north and east. The locality is within the Murray-Darling drainage basin within the catchment of the Condaimne River.

The Oakey–Cooyar Road traverses the locality entering from the south-east (Evergreen) and exiting to the north (Nutgrove).

The predominant land use is grazing on native vegetation with some crop growing in the south of the locality.

== History ==
The Cooyar railway line opened from Oakey to Cooyar in 1913. The Muntapa Tunnel was a concrete railway tunnel located on the line passing through the Great Dividing Range at the north-western corner of the locality connecting it to neighbouring Nutgrove to the north. The line closed through Highgrove on 1 May 1964.

== Demographics ==
In the 2016 census, Highgrove had a population of 29 people.

In the 2021 census, Highgrove had a population of 28 people.

== Heritage listings ==
Highgrove has a number of heritage-listed sites, including:

- Muntapa Tunnel, Narko-Nutgrove Road from Highgrove to Nutgrove (27.0758°S 151.7481°E)

== Economy ==
There are a number of homesteads in the locality:

- Bulgana (27.1265°S 151.7734°E)
- Burndale (27.1194°S 151.7690°E)
- Datarra Hills (27.0926°S 151.7742°E)
- Glazels (27.1295°S 151.7665°E)
- Rocky Basin (27.1279°S 151.7641°E)
- Springview (27.1189°S 151.7792°E)

== Education ==
There are no schools in Highgrove. The nearest government primary schools are:

- Kulpi State School in Kulpi to the south-west
- Quinalow State School in Quinalow to the west
- Cooyar State School in Cooyar to the north-east
- Haden State School in Haden to the south-east.

The nearest government secondary schools are Quinalow State School (to Year 10) in Quinalow and Oakey State High School in Oakey to the south.

There is also a Catholic primary school in Oakey.
