= Mount Binga =

Mount Binga may refer to:

- Mount Binga, Queensland, a locality in the Toowoomba Region, Australia
- Monte Binga, a mountain on the border of Zimbabwe and Mozambique in Africa
