= Emu Creek, Queensland =

Emu Creek
- Suburb
- Interactive map of Emu Creek
- Coordinates: 27.0738°S 151.9930°E
- Country: Australia
- State: Queensland
- LGA: Toowoomba Region
- Location: 56.6 km (35.2 mi) N of Highfields; 58.7 km (36.5 mi) W of Toogoolawah; 67.8 km (42.1 mi) N of Toowoomba; 75.8 km (47.1 mi) S of Nanango; 175 km (109 mi) WNW of Brisbane

Government
  - State electorate: Nanango
  - Federal division: Maranoa

Area
  - Total: 155.9 km^{2} (60.2 sq mi)

Population
  - Total: 113 (2021 census)
  - Density: 0.725/km^{2} (1.877/sq mi)
- Time zone: UTC+10:00 (AEST)
- Postcode: 4355
Suburbs around Emu Creek
Mount Binga	Mount Binga	Googa Creek
St Aubyn	Emu Creek	Anduramba
Coalbank; Djuan	Glenaven; Jones Gully	Pierces Creek

Emu Creek is a rural locality in the Toowoomba Region, Queensland, Australia. In the 2021 census, Emu Creek had a population of 113 people.

== Geography ==
The New England Highway enters the locality from the south-west (Coalbank) and exits to the south (Glenaven).

The land use is predominantly grazing on native vegetation with some crop growing. Emu Creek has the following mountains, from north to south:

- Woolshed Mountain (27.0172°S 152.0274°E) 484 metres (1,588 ft)
- Mount Shem (27.1117°S 152.0503°E) 632 metres (2,073 ft)
- Mount Ham (27.1212°S 152.0495°E) 658 metres (2,159 ft)
- Pechey Knob (27.1222°S 152.0350°E) 656 metres (2,152 ft)
- Mount Japheth (27.1238°S 152.0519°E) 664 metres (2,178 ft)

== History ==
The locality is presumably named for the creek of the same name which flows through the locality and is ultimately a tributary of the Brisbane River.

In 1877, 23,500 acres (9,500 ha) were resumed from the Eskdale pastoral run and offered for selection on 24 April 1877.

Emu Creek State School opened on 31 May 1875. Despite the name, the school is in East Greenmount.

Jubilee Vale State School opened in 1913 and closed in 1951. It was on a 2-acre (0.81 ha) site at 37 Maddern Road (27.09311°S 151.97882°E).

In 1879, the post office called Emu Creek Siding was renamed Greenmount, and the post office formerly called Greenmount was renamed Emu Creek.

== Demographics ==
In the 2016 census, Emu Creek had a population of 80 people.

In the 2021 census, Emu Creek had a population of 113 people.

== Education ==
There are no schools in Emu Creek. The nearest government primary schools are:

- Crow's Nest State School in Crows Nest to the south
- Haden State School in Haden to the south-west
- Cooyar State School in Cooyar to the north-west
- Blackbutt State School in Blackbutt to the north-east

The nearest government secondary schools are:

- Crow's Nest State School (to Year 10) in Crows Nest to the south
- Highfields State Secondary College (to Year 12) in Highfields to the south
- Yarraman State School (to Year 10) in Yarraman to the north
- Nanango State High School (to Year 12) in Nanango to the north
- Toogoolawah State High School (to Year 12) in Toogoolawah to the east

== Notable residents ==
Australian author Arthur Hoey Davis, who wrote under the pen name 'Steele Rudd', spent much of his childhood on his family's small block at Emu Creek near East Greenmount in the Cambooya district. He is best known for creating the Australian characters Dad 'n' Dave.
