= Bundaberg War Nurses Memorial =

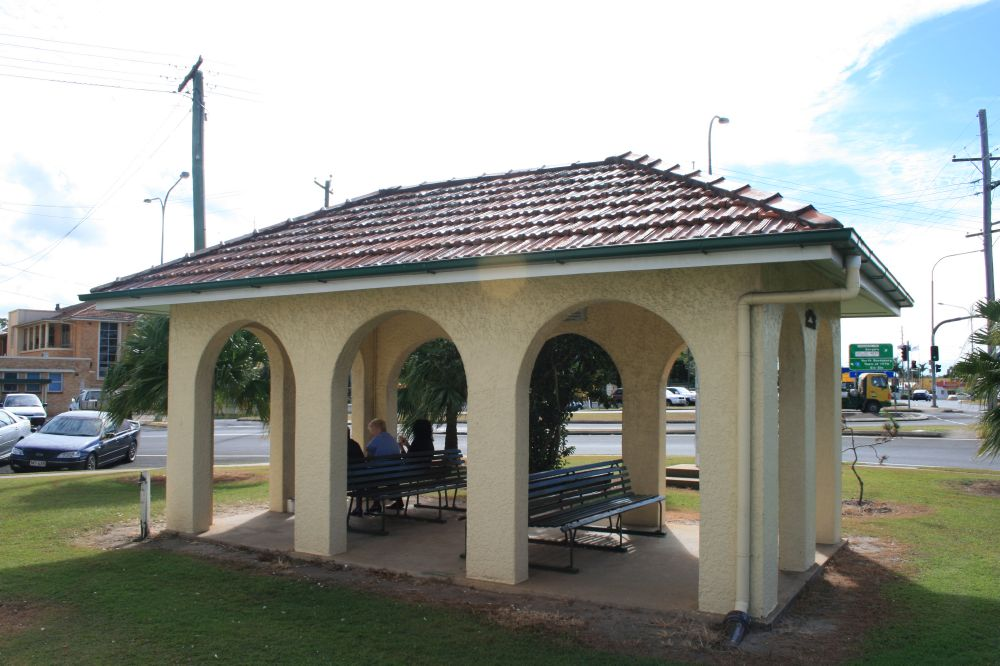
- Bundaberg War Nurses Memorial, 2009

- Location within Queensland
- 24.8701°S 152.3359°E
- Location: 276 Bourbong Street, Bundaberg West, Bundaberg, Bundaberg Region, Queensland, Australia

History
- Design period: 1940s–1960s (post-World War II)
- Built: 1949

Queensland Heritage Register
- Official name: Bundaberg War Nurses Memorial and Park
- Type: state heritage (built, landscape)
- Designated: 21 October 1992
- Reference no.: 600365
- Significant period: 1949– (social); 1949 (historical, fabric)
- Significant components: park / green space, trees/plantings, bench/seat, memorial – pavilion
- Builders: Zero Ziegler

Bundaberg War Nurses Memorial is a heritage-listed memorial at 276 Bourbong Street, Bundaberg West, Bundaberg, Bundaberg Region, Queensland, Australia. It was built in 1949 by Zero Ziegler. It was added to the Queensland Heritage Register on 21 October 1992.

== History ==
The Bundaberg War Nurses Memorial was officially opened on 15 October 1949 by the Mayor of Bundaberg, Alderman F H Buss. It is thought to have been designed by Bundaberg architect E H Boden. The memorial honours the 12 local women who served as nursing sisters in the First World War and the 4 who served in the Second World War, two of whom died, one (Sister Pearl Mittelheuser) in a Japanese prisoner of war camp and the other (Sister Joyce Whyllie) in the sinking of the Centaur.

The town of Bundaberg profited from the growth of the sugar industry in the 1880s. The Millaquin refinery and private milling companies invested in the area and by 1920 the city had become directly and indirectly dependent on the sugar industry.

The impetus for a war nurses memorial was initiated by the West Bundaberg Progress Association who approached the City Council and requested that the parcel of land be made available to them for beautification purposes. At the time of unveiling, it was the only tribute to war nurses in Australia. The unveiling ceremony was attended by a large crowd of civilians and fifty nurses in white uniforms formed a guard of honour. Many people were thanked at the unveiling, including architect E H Boden who also formally opened the steel entrance gate to the park.

Many local companies and individuals contributed to the construction of the memorial. These included architect E H Boden, local monumental mason Zero Ziegler, who donated the marble honour roll and Mr Cunnington, the Bundaberg City Gardens Curator, who supervised the layout and planting of the park.

Eric Hawksley Boden was born in Brisbane. He became an architectural cadet with the Queensland Government in 1909 before working for architects in private practice in Brisbane. In 1922 he travelled throughout Europe and Africa. He was registered as an architect in Queensland in 1929 and opened his own practice in Maryborough in 1938. Boden also served in the Second World War as the architect for USA forces in Townsville.

The firm of Zero Ziegler was founded in Bundaberg in 1902 as Ziegler and Sons. They provided many memorials throughout South East Queensland and are still operating as monumental masons.

The pavilion was constructed at a cost of over £1000 which was raised in seven weeks by public subscription and fund raising by the Bundaberg General Hospital and the women of the Red Cross.

Australia, and Queensland in particular, had few civic monuments before the First World War. The memorials erected in its wake became our first national monuments, recording the devastating impact of the war on a young nation. Australia lost 60,000 from a population of about 4 million, representing one in five of those who served. No previous or subsequent war has made such an impact on the nation.

Even before the end of the war, memorials became a spontaneous and highly visible expression of national grief. To those who erected them, they were as sacred as grave sites, substitute graves for the Australians whose bodies lay in battlefield cemeteries in Europe and the Middle East. British policy decreed that the Empire war dead were to be buried where they fell. The word "cenotaph", commonly applied to war memorials at the time, literally means "empty tomb".

Australian war memorials are distinctive in that they commemorate not only the dead. Australians were proud that their first great national army, unlike other belligerent armies, was composed entirely of volunteers, men worthy of honour whether or not they made the supreme sacrifice. Many memorials honour all who served from a locality, not just the dead, providing valuable evidence of community involvement in the war. Such evidence is not readily obtainable from military records, or from state or national listings, where names are categorised alphabetically or by military unit.

Australian war memorials are also valuable evidence of imperial and national loyalties, at the time, not seen as conflicting; the skills of local stonemasons, metalworkers and architects; and of popular taste. In Queensland, the soldier statue was the popular choice of memorial, whereas the obelisk predominated in the southern states, possibly a reflection of Queensland's larger working-class population and a lesser involvement of architects.

Many of the First World War monuments have been updated to record local involvement in later conflicts, and some have fallen victim to unsympathetic re-location and repair.

Although there are many different types of war memorials throughout Queensland, apart from honour boards, this is the only known one that honours the role of women in the First World War.

== Description ==
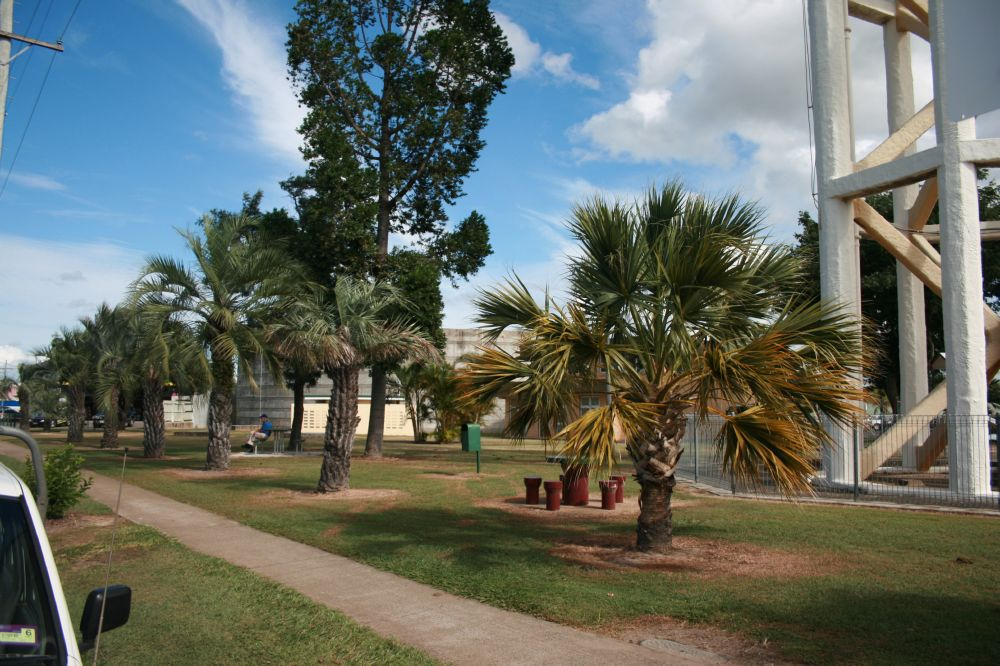
Park, 2009

The Memorial Pavilion is situated in a triangular shaped park planted with palm trees opposite the Bundaberg Base Hospital. The park is at the junction of two main streets in Bundaberg with the pavilion facing the corner.

The pavilion itself is approximately 7 metres (23 ft) long and 4 metres (13 ft) wide and has white painted stucco walls and a terracotta tiled roof. All fours sides have arched openings with piers between. There are three openings on the long sides and two on the short sides. High on the exterior wall of the southern face is bronze lettering explaining the purpose of the pavilion.

Internally, the pavilion has a concrete floor with two timber and iron park benches in the centre. Leaded marble plaques are located at the top of the interior walls. The first is an honour roll which lists the names of the local nursing sisters who served in the First and Second World Wars. The names of the two who died on service are identified with a leaded cross. The second marble plaque records the details of the commissioning and unveiling of the pavilion.

== Heritage listing ==
Bundaberg War Nurses Memorial was listed on the Queensland Heritage Register on 21 October 1992 having satisfied the following criteria.

The place is important in demonstrating the evolution or pattern of Queensland's history.

War memorials are important in demonstrating the pattern of Queensland's history as they are representative of a recurrent theme that involved most communities throughout the state. They provide evidence of an era of widespread Australian patriotism and nationalism, particularly during and following the First World War.

The place demonstrates rare, uncommon or endangered aspects of Queensland's cultural heritage.

This particular memorial is rare as the only war nurses memorial, other than honour boards, in Queensland and the only known one in Australia. It is also an uncommon example of a memorial still situated in its intact setting.

The place is important in demonstrating the principal characteristics of a particular class of cultural places.

The monuments manifest a unique documentary record and are demonstrative of popular taste in the inter-war period. Erected in 1949, the memorial at Bundaberg demonstrates the principal characteristics of a commemorative structure erected as an enduring record of a major historical event. This is achieved through the use of appropriate materials and design elements.

The place is important because of its aesthetic significance.

The memorial and its setting are significant for their contribution to the aesthetic qualities of the townscape and creates a conspicuous landmark at the junction of two major streets.

The place has a strong or special association with a particular community or cultural group for social, cultural or spiritual reasons.

It has a strong and continuing association with the community as evidence of the impact of a major historic event and as the focal point for the remembrance of that event.

The place has a special association with the life or work of a particular person, group or organisation of importance in Queensland's history.

It also has special association with the local firms and individuals involved in its erection including architect E H Boden, monumental masonry firm Zero Ziegler and Gardens Curator Mr Cunnington.
