= Coalbank, Queensland =

Coalbank
- Suburb
- Interactive map of Coalbank
- Coordinates: 27.1233°S 151.8597°E
- Country: Australia
- State: Queensland
- LGA: Toowoomba Region
- Location: 32.4 km (20.1 mi) NW of Crows Nest; 49.2 km (30.6 mi) N of Highfields; 53.8 km (33.4 mi) NE of Oakey; 76.1 km (47.3 mi) N of Toowoomba CBD; 183 km (114 mi) WNW of Brisbane

Government
  - State electorate: Nanango
  - Federal division: Maranoa

Area
  - Total: 96.8 km^{2} (37.4 sq mi)

Population
  - Total: 45 (2021 census)
  - Density: 0.465/km^{2} (1.204/sq mi)
- Time zone: UTC+10:00 (AEST)
- Postcode: 4352
Suburbs around Coalbank
Thornville	Thornville	St Aubyn
Highgrove	Coalbank	Emu Creek
Doctor Creek	Doctor Creek	Djuan

Coalbank is a rural locality in the Toowoomba Region, Queensland, Australia. In the 2021 census, Coalbank had a population of 45 people.

== History ==
Coalbank Provisional School opened in 1906. On 1 January 1909, it became Coalbank State School. It closed in 1961. It was on the south-western corner of Coalbank Road and Schultz Road (approx 27.10867°S 151.86420°E).

Tenders were called in September 1929 to build a hall in Coalbank. The hall was operating by March 1930.

St John's Evangelical Lutheran Church opened on 4 January 1931. It was on Schefe Road in Coalbank, now within St Aubyn (27.0889°S 151.8870°E). It was a timber church built in the Gothic style, 18 by 28 feet (5.5 by 8.5 m). It closed in 1968 and the building was demolished.

On Sunday 15 March 1931, Bishop James Byrne blessed and officially opened St James' Catholic Church. The church was closed and sold in 1982. The church was at 54 Schultz Road (27.11245°S 151.86139°E). As at November 2023, the church building was still extant.

== Demographics ==
In the 2016 census, Coalbank had a population of 30 people.

In the 2021 census, Coalbank had a population of 45 people.

== Education ==
There are no schools in Coalbank. The nearest government primary schools are Haden State School in Haden to the south, Kulpi State School in Kulpi to the south-west, and Cooyar State School in Cooyar to the north. The nearest government secondary schools are Crow's Nest State School (to Year 10) in Crows Nest to the south-east, Highfields State Secondary College (to Year 12) in Highfields to the south, Oakey State High School (to Year 12) in Oakey to the south-west, and Quinalow State School (to Year 10) in Quinalow to the south-west.

== Amenities ==
Coalbank Hall is on Schultz Road (27.10932°S 151.86123°E).
