= St Aubyn, Queensland =

St Aubyn
- Suburb
- Interactive map of St Aubyn
- Coordinates: 27.0744°S 151.9055°E
- Country: Australia
- State: Queensland
- LGA: Toowoomba Region
- Location: 30.6 km (19.0 mi) NNW of Crows Nest; 62.2 km (38.6 mi) N of Highfields; 74.7 km (46.4 mi) N of Toowoomba CBD; 181 km (112 mi) NW of Brisbane

Government
  - State electorate: Nanango
  - Federal division: Maranoa

Area
  - Total: 14.0 km^{2} (5.4 sq mi)

Population
  - Total: 14 (2021 census)
  - Density: 1.00/km^{2} (2.59/sq mi)
- Time zone: UTC+10:00 (AEST)
- Postcode: 4352
Suburbs around St Aubyn
East Cooyar	Mount Binga	Mount Binga
Thornville	St Aubyn	Emu Creek
Coalbank	Coalbank	Emu Creek

St Aubyn is a rural locality in the Toowoomba Region, Queensland, Australia. In the 2021 census, St Aubyn had a population of 14 people.

== Geography ==
Most of the southern boundary of the locality follows Bum Bum Creek and its tributary Spring Creek.

The New England Highway enters the locality from the south (Coalbank) and exits to the west (Thornville).

High Camp is a mountain in the north of the locality (27.0605°S 151.8988°E) which rises to 644 metres (2,113 ft) above sea level.

The land use is a mixture of grazing on native vegetation and crop growing.

== History ==
St John's Evangelical Lutheran Church opened on 4 January 1931. It was on Schefe Road, then in Coalbank but now within St Aubyn (27.0889°S 151.8870°E). It was a timber church built in the Gothic style, 18 by 28 feet (5.5 by 8.5 m). It closed in 1968 and the building was demolished.

== Demographics ==
In the 2016 census, St Aubyn had a population of 8 people.

In the 2021 census, St Aubyn had a population of 14 people.

== Education ==
There are no schools in St Aubyn. The nearest government primary school is Cooyar State School in Cooyar to the north-west. The nearest government secondary schools are Crow's Nest State School (to Year 10) in Crows Nest and Highfields State Secondary College in Highfields to the south. However, the Highfields school may be distant for a daily commute from some parts of St Aubyn; the alternatives are distance education and boarding school.
