= Nutgrove, Queensland =

Nutgrove
- Suburb
- Interactive map of Nutgrove
- Coordinates: 27.0488°S 151.7552°E
- Country: Australia
- State: Queensland
- LGA: Toowoomba Region
- Location: 11.4 km (7.1 mi) SW of Cooyar; 22.6 km (14.0 mi) NE of Quinalow; 53.8 km (33.4 mi) N of Oakey; 79.8 km (49.6 mi) N of Toowoomba; 199 km (124 mi) WNW of Brisbane

Government
  - State electorate: Nanango
  - Federal divisions: Groom; Maranoa

Area
  - Total: 23.2 km^{2} (9.0 sq mi)

Population
  - Total: 26 (2021 census)
  - Density: 1.121/km^{2} (2.90/sq mi)
- Time zone: UTC+10:00 (AEST)
- Postcode: 4352
Suburbs around Nutgrove
Upper Cooyar Creek	Upper Cooyar Creek	Wutul
Maclagan	Nutgrove	Wutul
Narko	Highgrove	Thornville

Nutgrove is a rural locality in the Toowoomba Region, Queensland, Australia. In the 2021 census, Nutgrove had a population of 26 people.

== Geography ==
The Oakey–Cooyar Road runs through from south to north-east. The Dalby–Cooyar Road enters from the west and joins Oakey–Cooyar Road.

== History ==
The Cooyar railway line opened to Nutgrove on 28 April 1913 with the locality served by the Nutgrove railway station, located immediately to the north of Douglas Nutgrove Road (27.04446°S 151.77439°E), now in Wutul.

Nutgrove State School opened on 20 June 1923 and closed in 1947. It was located at 5779 Dalby Cooyar Road (27.05085°S 151.75841°E).

== Demographics ==
In the 2016 census, Nutgrove had a population of 32 people.

In the 2021 census, Nutgrove had a population of 26 people.

== Heritage listings ==
Nutgrove has a number of heritage-listed sites, including:

- Muntapa Tunnel, Narko-Nutgrove Road from Highgrove to Nutgrove (27.0756°S 151.7480°E)

== Economy ==
There are a number of homesteads in the locality:

- Bowriver (27.0729°S 151.7605°E)
- Highgrove (27.0831°S 151.7687°E)

== Education ==
There are no schools in Nutgrove. The nearest government primary school is Cooyar State School in Cooyar to the north-east. The nearest government secondary school is Quinalow State School (providing schooling up to Year 10) in Quinalow to the south-west with the more distant Oakey State High School in Oakey to the south providing schooling up to Year 12.
