= Cunnamulla War Memorial Fountain =

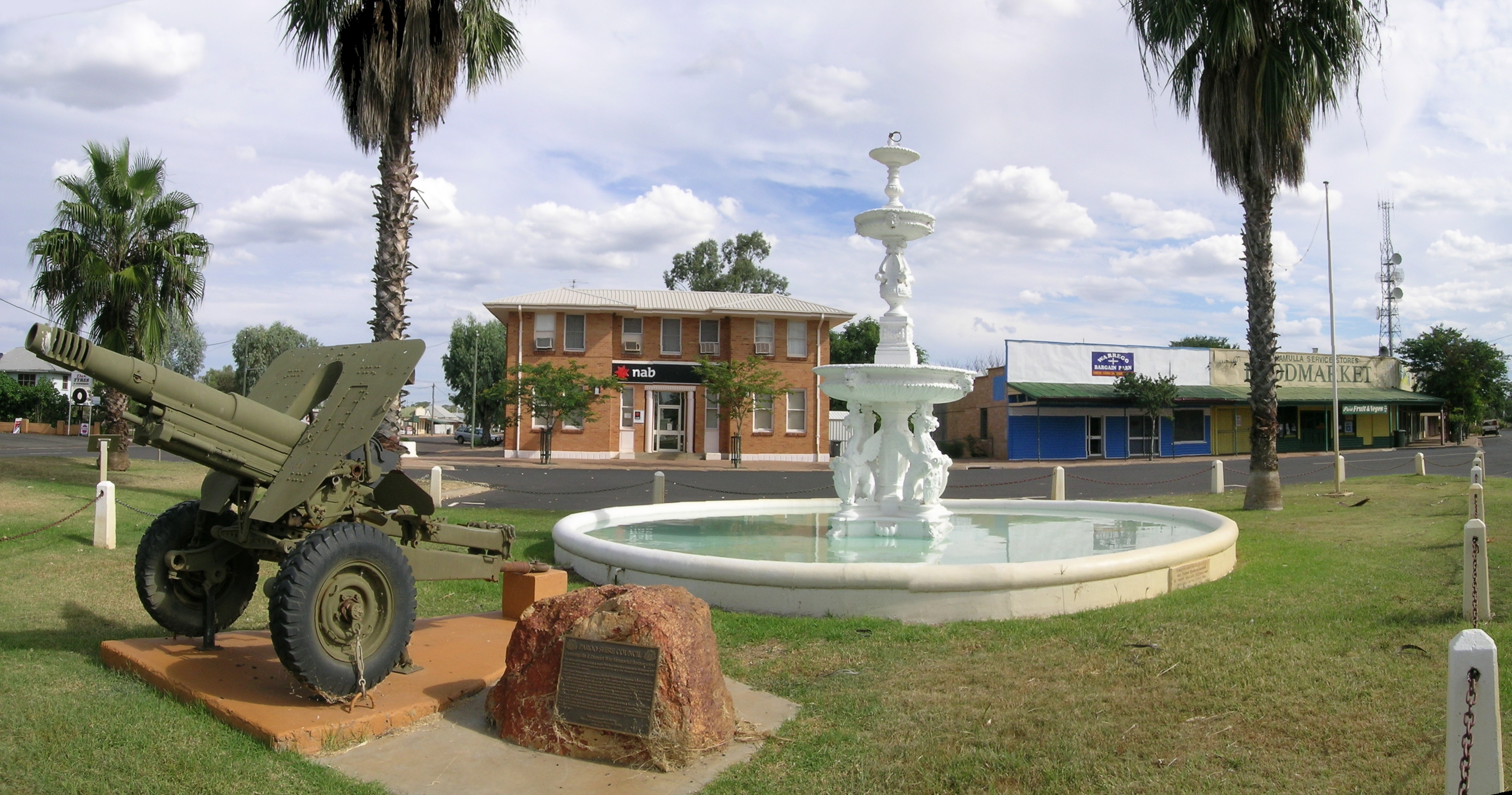
- Cunnamulla War Memorial

- Location within Queensland
- 28.0679°S 145.6838°E
- Location: John Street, Cunnamulla, Shire of Paroo, Queensland, Australia

History
- Design period: 1919–1930s (interwar period)
- Built: c. 1924

Queensland Heritage Register
- Official name: Cunnamulla War Memorial Fountain
- Type: state heritage (built)
- Designated: 21 October 1992
- Reference no.: 600760
- Significant period: c. 1924– (social) c. 1924 (historical, fabric)
- Significant components: memorial surrounds/railings, memorial – fountain

Cunnamulla War Memorial Fountain is a heritage-listed memorial at John Street, Cunnamulla, Shire of Paroo, Queensland, Australia. It was built c. 1924. It was added to the Queensland Heritage Register on 21 October 1992.

== History ==
It is not known by whom the Cunnamulla War Memorial Fountain was designed. The concrete memorial honours those who fell during the First World War. The names of the fallen were not listed on the memorial, but on an honour board in the Civic Centre and relocated in 2019 to the Cunnamulla library. Indeed, if not for an inscription, the fountain would be difficult to identify as a war memorial.

By 1920 the Paroo Shire Council had decided to erect a war memorial fountain in the centre of Cunnamulla town. However, it appears that the memorial was not erected immediately as in July 1924, the masonry firm of Andrew Lang Petrie, Brisbane wrote to the Paroo Shire Council offering designs. In September 1926, the Paroo Shire Council and the Diggers' Racing Club agreed to erect a fountain, expecting it to be in place in time for the Diggers' Carnival on 11–13 November that year. The design is a copy of a fountain in Rome erected some 400 years earlier and believed to be the work of the sculptor Carozzo; the Cunnamulla fountain was executed by R.C. Ziegler and Son.

It is unclear if there was an official unveiling ceremony, but in November 1926 there was a newspaper description of the memorial and a photo.

The town of Cunnamulla was first settled in the 1880s to serve the developing pastoral area. The Western railway line was extended to the town in 1898, increasing its importance as a centre for the district.

Australia, and Queensland in particular, had few civic monuments before the First World War. The memorials erected in its wake became the first national monuments, recording the devastating impact of the war on a young nation. Australia lost 60,000 from a population of about 4 million, representing one in five of those who served. No previous or subsequent war has made such an impact on the nation.

Even before the end of the war, memorials became a spontaneous and highly visible expression of national grief. To those who erected them, they were as sacred as grave sites, substitute graves for the Australians whose bodies lay in battlefield cemeteries in Europe and the Middle East. British policy decreed that the Empire war dead were to be buried where they fell. The word "cenotaph", commonly applied to war memorials at the time, literally means "empty tomb".

Australian war memorials are distinctive in that they commemorate not only the dead. Australians were proud that their first great national army, unlike other belligerent armies, was composed entirely of volunteers, men worthy of honour whether or not they paid the supreme sacrifice. Many memorials honour all who served from a locality, not just the dead, providing valuable evidence of community involvement in the war. Such evidence is not readily obtainable from military records, or from state or national listings, where names are categorised alphabetically or by military unit.

Australian war memorials are also valuable evidence of imperial and national loyalties, at the time, not seen as conflicting; the skills of local stonemasons, metalworkers and architects; and of popular taste. In Queensland, the digger (soldier) statue was the popular choice of memorial, whereas the obelisk predominated in the southern states, possibly a reflection of Queensland's larger working-class population and a lesser involvement of architects.

Many of the First World War monuments have been updated to record local involvement in later conflicts, and some have fallen victim to unsympathetic re-location and repair. Although there are many different types of memorials in Queensland, fountains were an uncommon selection as the main town memorial. They were more often used in school grounds where, as drinking fountains, they also served a useful function.

Fountains were selected as memorials in other places, as water was considered symbolic of renewed life and cleansing. Water is a significant element in many memorials of note, including The Pool of Reflection in the Australian War Memorial in Canberra. Many other smaller memorials had drinking spouts and water troughs incorporated into their designs.

As water is a scarce commodity in rural Queensland, a fountain may have been considered a suitable "sacrifice" as a memorial.

There was originally a captured gun or "war trophy" within the enclosure, but this was removed at some stage.

== Description ==
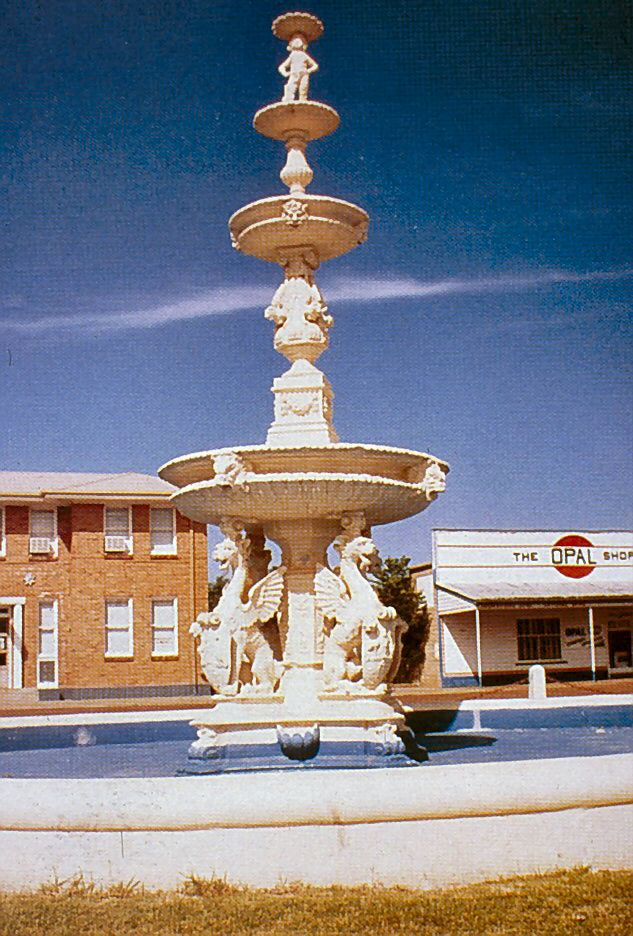
Fountain, 2015

The First World War Memorial is situated in a five-way intersection, forming a traffic island in the centre. It is surrounded by a grassed strip and enclosed by a low post and chain fence.

The concrete memorial comprises a shallow trough, with a tall and elaborate centrepiece. The trough measures 7 metres (23 ft) in diameter and is painted blue internally. A small leaded marble plaque on the north face bears the inscription:

Erected by the citizens of Paroo Shire in memory of those gallant Australians who fell in the Great War 1914 - 1918.

The centrepiece comprises four basins, decreasing in scale as they reach the peak. The lower basin has scalloped edges which incorporates heads of gargoyles. It is supported by four large winged griffins holding shields bearing emus and kangaroos. They sit on a base with foliated designs at the centre and corner of each face.

Above the first basin is a square pedestal with moulded festoons on each face. This is surmounted by an urn-like element with four small winged griffins and scrollwork at the top, which is the support for the second basin. This is also has scalloped edges and heads of gargoyles. The shaft continues to rises to a third basin which is simpler in design and is surmounted by a small boy figure. The final basin is located above the figure's head.

The entire shaft, which tapers towards the peak, is heavily ornamented with a variety of design elements, including scrollwork, panels and foliated patterns.

== Heritage listing ==
Cunnamulla War Memorial Fountain was listed on the Queensland Heritage Register on 21 October 1992 having satisfied the following criteria.

The place is important in demonstrating the evolution or pattern of Queensland's history.

War Memorials are important in demonstrating the pattern of Queensland's history as they are representative of a recurrent theme that involved most communities throughout the state. They provide evidence of an era of widespread Australian patriotism and nationalism, particularly during and following the First World War. The monuments manifest a unique documentary record and are demonstrative of popular taste in the inter-war period.

The place demonstrates rare, uncommon or endangered aspects of Queensland's cultural heritage.

War memorial fountains of this scale are uncommon in Queensland, however water is a popular symbolic element suggesting renewed life and cleansing. It is rare as a war memorial with imagery not found on other memorials.

The place is important because of its aesthetic significance.

The memorial is of aesthetic significance as a distinctive landmark in the centre of a small country town.

The place has a strong or special association with a particular community or cultural group for social, cultural or spiritual reasons.

It has a strong and continuing association with the community as evidence of the impact of a major historic event and as the focal point for the remembrance of that event.
