= Cooyar War Memorial =

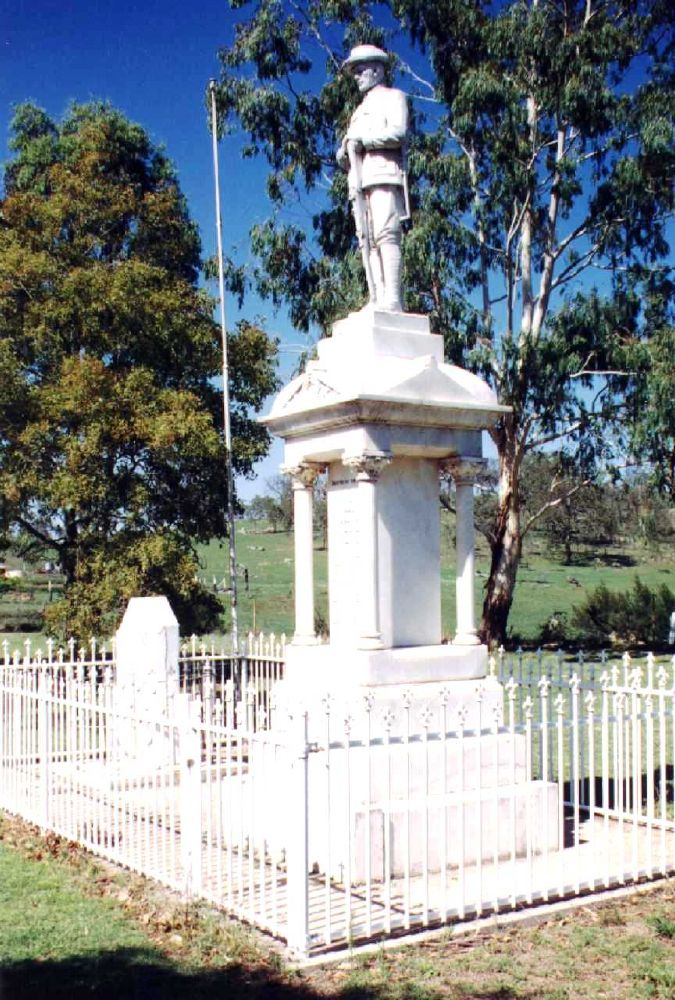
- Cooyar War Memorial

- Location within Queensland
- 26.9828°S 151.831°E
- Location: McDougall Street, Cooyar, Toowoomba Region, Queensland, Australia

History
- Design period: 1919 - 1930s (interwar period)
- Built: 1923 - 1923

Queensland Heritage Register
- Official name: Cooyar War Memorial
- Type: state heritage (built)
- Designated: 21 October 1992
- Reference no.: 600825
- Significant period: 1923- (social); 1923 (historical, fabric)
- Significant components: park / green space, memorial/monument, memorial surrounds/railings, memorial - soldier statue, memorial - plaque
- Builders: R. C. Ziegler & Son

Cooyar War Memorial is a heritage-listed war memorial in Hack Menkins Park, McDougall Street, Cooyar, Toowoomba Region, Queensland, Australia. The memorial was unveiled on Saturday 14 July 1923 by Arthur Edward Moore (MLA for Aubigny). It was designed and produced by R. C. Ziegler and Son and cost £413/10/0, with funds raised by public subscriptions and revenue raised from entertainments. The memorial comprises two pieces, the pedestal surmounted by a digger statue, on which the names of the 25 fallen are recorded, and a smaller plinth which records the names of the 110 local men who served in World War I. It was added to the Queensland Heritage Register on 21 October 1992.

== History ==
Australia, and Queensland in particular, had few civic monuments before the First World War. The memorials erected in its wake became our first national monuments, recording the devastating impact of the war on a young nation. Australia lost 60,000 from a population of about 4 million, representing one in five of those who served. No previous or subsequent war has made such an impact on the nation.

Even before the end of the war, memorials became a spontaneous and highly visible expression of national grief. To those who erected them, they were as sacred as grave sites, substitute graves for the Australians whose bodies lay in battlefield cemeteries in Europe and the Middle East. British policy decreed that the Empire war dead were to be buried where they fell. The word "cenotaph", commonly applied to war memorials at the time, literally means "empty tomb".

Australian war memorials are distinctive in that they commemorate not only the dead. Australians were proud that their first great national army, unlike other belligerent armies, was composed entirely of volunteers, men worthy of honour whether or not they made the supreme sacrifice. Many memorials honour all who served from a locality, not just the dead, providing valuable evidence of community involvement in the war. Such evidence is not readily obtainable from military records, or from state or national listings, where names are categorised alphabetically or by military unit.

Australian war memorials are also valuable evidence of imperial and national loyalties, at the time, not seen as conflicting; the skills of local stonemasons, metalworkers and architects; and of popular taste. In Queensland, the soldier statue was the popular choice of memorial, whereas the obelisk predominated in the southern states, possibly a reflection of Queensland's larger working-class population and a lesser involvement of architects.

Many of the First World War monuments have been updated to record local involvement in later conflicts, and some have fallen victim to unsympathetic re-location and repair.

Although there are many different types of memorials in Queensland, the digger statue is the most common. It was the most popular choice of communities responsible for erecting the memorials, embodying the ANZAC Spirit and representing the qualities of the ideal Australian: loyalty, courage, youth, innocence and masculinity. The digger was a phenomenon peculiar to Queensland, perhaps due to the fact that other states had followed Britain's lead and established Advisory Boards made up of architects and artists, prior to the erection of war memorials. The digger statue was not highly regarded by artists and architects who were involved in the design of relatively few Queensland memorials.

Most statues were constructed by local masonry firms, although some were by artists or imported.

The pedestal for this memorial was produced in Queensland by monumental masons, R C Ziegler and Son of the Downs Electric Monumental Works, Toowoomba; however the digger statue was imported from Italy.

The firm of R. C. Ziegler and Son was established in Toowoomba in c. 1902 and produced many memorials throughout south western Queensland. The family company moved to Bundaberg where it was still operating in the mid 1980s.

There were originally two German machine guns situated near the monument, but these have been removed at some stage.

== Description ==
The First World War memorial is situated in Hack Menkins Park which is located beside the main highway through the town of Cooyar. The memorial comprises a monument and a separate plinth recording the soldiers names. Both are surrounded by a white painted cast iron picket fence with fleur-de-lis finials.

The monument stands 5.10 metres (16.7 ft) high and comprises a pedestal surmounted by a digger statue.

The marble memorial sits on a double stepped base of painted smooth-faced stone. Two steps of a smaller scale support the pedestal itself which comprises a recessed section with a column at each corner. The front face bears the leaded names of the Brave Boys who fell in the Great War. Each column has carved foliated capitals and simply moulded bases. The four columns support a frieze and cornice surmounted by a concave section with pediments on each face. The pediments are plain except for the front one which displays a relief carved wreath and ribbon design.

Surmounting the pedestal is the life-sized digger statue. The soldier stands with his head bowed and his hands crossed on top of a rifle. The rifle is reversed and resting on the top of his left boot. A tree stump is located at the rear and to the right of the statue for support.

A smaller plinth is located on the south-eastern side of the main monument. This is a painted stone structure similar to a gravestone. It sits on a concrete pad and is surrounded by a red painted cast iron picket fence with fleur-de-lis finials. Both the plinth and the fence are located in the confines of the main fence. A leaded marble plaque on the front face records the names of the local men who served in the First World War.

== Heritage listing ==
Cooyar War Memorial was listed on the Queensland Heritage Register on 21 October 1992 having satisfied the following criteria.

The place is important in demonstrating the evolution or pattern of Queensland's history.

War Memorials are important in demonstrating the pattern of Queensland's history as they are representative of a recurrent theme that involved most communities throughout the state. They provide evidence of an era of widespread Australian patriotism and nationalism, particularly during and following the First World War.

Unveiled in 1923, the memorial at Cooyar demonstrates the principal characteristics of a commemorative structure erected as an enduring record of a major historical event.

The place is important in demonstrating the principal characteristics of a particular class of cultural places.

The monuments manifest a unique documentary record and are demonstrative of popular taste in the inter-war period.

Unveiled in 1923, the memorial at Cooyar demonstrates the principal characteristics of a commemorative structure erected as an enduring record of a major historical event.

This is achieved through the use of appropriate materials and design elements. As a digger statue it is representative of the most popular form of memorial in Queensland.

The place is important because of its aesthetic significance.

This particular statue is of aesthetic value for its high degree of workmanship and design and is an uncommon example of a memorial still situated in its original and intact setting. It is of an extravagant scale in comparison to the size of Cooyar and is a dominant landmark within the town.

The place has a strong or special association with a particular community or cultural group for social, cultural or spiritual reasons.

It has a strong association with the community as evidence of the impact of a major historic event and also with Toowoomba monumental masons, R. C. Ziegler and Son as an example of their work.

The place has a special association with the life or work of a particular person, group or organisation of importance in Queensland's history.

It has a strong association with the community as evidence of the impact of a major historic event and also with Toowoomba monumental masons, R. C. Ziegler and Son as an example of their work.
