= East Cooyar, Queensland =

East Cooyar
- Suburb
- Interactive map of East Cooyar
- Coordinates: 27.0313°S 151.8719°E
- Country: Australia
- State: Queensland
- LGA: Toowoomba Region
- Location: 37.4 km (23.2 mi) SW of Yarraman; 52.5 km (32.6 mi) NE of Quinalow; 58.3 km (36.2 mi) NE of Nanango; 99.0 km (61.5 mi) N of Toowoomba CBD; 208 km (129 mi) NW of Brisbane

Government
  - State electorate: Nanango
  - Federal division: Maranoa

Area
  - Total: 37.5 km^{2} (14.5 sq mi)

Population
  - Total: 27 (2021 census)
  - Density: 0.720/km^{2} (1.86/sq mi)
- Time zone: UTC+10:00 (AEST)
- Postcode: 4353
Suburbs around East Cooyar
Cooyar	Cooyar	Mount Binga
Wutul	East Cooyar	Mount Binga
Thornville	Thornville	St Aubyn

East Cooyar is a rural locality in the Toowoomba Region, Queensland, Australia. In the 2021 census, East Cooyar had a population of 27 people.

== Geography ==
The land use is predominantly grazing on native vegetation, apart from small amounts of crop growing and production forestry.

== History ==
The locality takes its name from the town, which in turn takes its name from Cooyar Creek, which in turn is believed to be a corruption of the Waka word kuiyum, kuya or kuiyur meaning fire.

== Demographics ==
In the 2016 census, East Cooyar had a population of 26 people.

In the 2021 census, East Cooyar had a population of 27 people.

== Education ==
There are no schools in East Cooyar. The nearest government primary school is Cooyar State School in neighbouring Cooyar to the north-west. The nearest government secondary schools are Yarraman State School (to Year 10) in Yarraman to the north, Quinalow State School (to Year 10) in Quinalow to the south-west, and Nanango State High School (to Year 12) in Nanango to the north.
