= HMS Centaur =

Eight ships of the Royal Navy have borne the name HMS Centaur, after the half-human, half-horse centaur of Greek mythology:

- HMS Centaur (1746) was a 24-gun sixth rate launched in 1746 and sold in 1761.
- HMS Centaur (1759) was a 74-gun third rate ship of the line, formerly the French ship Centaure. She was captured at the Battle of Lagos in 1759, and foundered in a hurricane in 1782.
- HMS Centaur (1797) was a 74-gun third rate launched in 1797, decommissioned in 1816, and broken up in 1819.
- HMS Centaur (1845) was a wooden paddle frigate launched in 1845 and scrapped in 1864.
- HMS Centaur was to have been an Edgar-class armoured cruiser, but she was renamed HMS Royal Arthur in 1890, prior to her launch in 1891.
- HMS Centaur (1916) was a C-class cruiser and lead ship of the Centaur subclass. She was launched in 1916 and sold for scrap in 1934.
- HMS Centaur was to have been a C-class destroyer. She was ordered in 1942, but was subsequently redesigned as a Weapon-class destroyer and renamed HMS Tomahawk in 1943. She was eventually launched in 1946 as HMS Scorpion.
- HMS Centaur (R06) was a Centaur-class aircraft carrier, launched in 1947 and scrapped in 1970.

== See also ==
- Centaur (ship) for non-Royal Navy ships of the name.
