= Cooyar railway line =

Railway line in Queensland, Australia

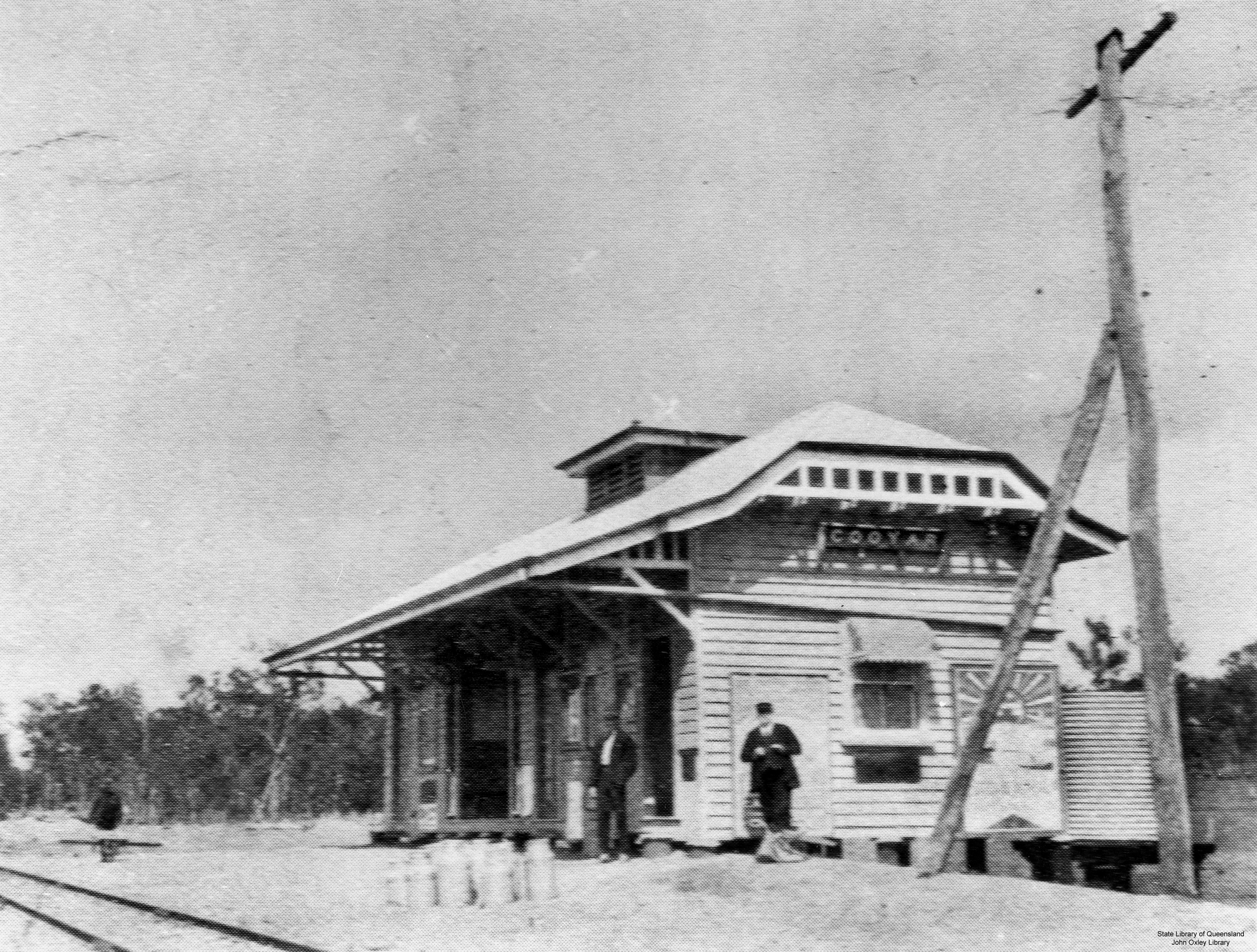
- Railway station at Cooyar, 1926

Overview
- Status: Dismantled
- Termini: Oakey, Queensland; Cooyar, Queensland

Service
- Operator(s): Queensland Rail

History
- Opened: 28 April 1913
- Closed: 8 December 1969

Technical
- Line length: 63 km (39 mi)
- Track gauge: 3 ft 6 in (1,067 mm)

The Cooyar railway line was a branch line in the Darling Downs region of Queensland, Australia. The small town of Cooyar is about halfway to Kingaroy in the South Burnett Region. A plan to connect Kingaroy to the south via Cooyar did not eventuate and left Cooyar at the terminus of a branch line running from Oakey west of Toowoomba.

== History ==
On 2 November 1909, the Queensland Legislative Assembly passed legislation to build a railway line from Oakey to Cooyar, a distance of 38 miles 50 chains (62.2 km). The intention was to subsequently extend the line to Tarong, which was connected by rail to Kingaroy and beyond into the Burnett River area.

The line was opened to Kulpi (then known as Rosalie) on 29 April 1912. It opened to Peranga on 4 November 1912. The line opened from Peranga to Cooyar on 29 April 1913.

The line was partially closed beyond Acland on 1 May 1964, with the last segment closed on 8 December 1969.

== Services ==
Mixed trains initially ran four times a week and were replaced in 1929 by a daily rail motor service to Toowoomba. The line connected the small towns of Acland, Kulpi, Peranga, Narko, Nutgrove, Wutul and Cooyar to the Queensland Rail western line at Oakey until 1964. This provided passenger and farm produce services not only to these towns but also to the surrounding townships of Quinalow, Maclagan and Evergreen.

Coal was transported between Acland and Oakey, this portion of the branch line remained in service until 1969. A similar parallel branch line existed connected Haden to the Western Line at Kingsthorpe from 1910 to 1964. As the competing service of bullock carts gave way to motor vehicles rail patronage declined resulting in both services becoming uneconomical to maintain.

With negligible track remaining the Oakey-Cooyar branch line could all but be overlooked as a fading scar on the landscape, it retains its significance however through the still intact Muntapa Tunnel. A feat of early Queensland Railways engineering achievement, the Muntapa Tunnel remains the only tunnel in Queensland to pass under the summit of Eastern Australia's Great Dividing Range. This tunnel was constructed with manual labour. It is now home to a colony of bats.

The Oakey-Cooyer branch line is also of early surveying significance. Rail engineering practice of the period avoided the construction of tunnels, so significant surveying was undertaken to avoid tunnelling and to minimise rail gradients. The largest gradient of a line mandates a larger, more expensive loco or a de-rating of carrying capacity, both of which would result in a less economical service for the line as a whole. The Oakey-Cooyar branch line was repeatedly surveyed to arrive at its built route, which had a negligible gradient over its length, but which required the 300m tunnel. The low gradient required a devious route, particularly at Narko and adjacent to the tunnel.
