= Woodleigh, Queensland =

Woodleigh
- Suburb
- Interactive map of Woodleigh
- Coordinates: 27.0861°S 151.6752°E
- Country: Australia
- State: Queensland
- LGA: Toowoomba Region
- Location: 50.5 km (31.4 mi) ENE of Dalby; 51.2 km (31.8 mi) N of Oakey; 78.7 km (48.9 mi) NNW of Toowoomba CBD; 210 km (130 mi) WNW of Brisbane

Government
  - State electorate: Nanango
  - Federal division: Groom

Area
  - Total: 4.5 km^{2} (1.7 sq mi)

Population
  - Total: 10 (2021 census)
  - Density: 2.2/km^{2} (5.8/sq mi)
- Time zone: UTC+10:00 (AEST)
- Postcode: 4352
Suburbs around Woodleigh
Maclagan	Maclagan	Maclagan
Maclagan	Woodleigh	Narko
Maclagan	Maclagan	Narko

Woodleigh is a rural locality in the Toowoomba Region, Queensland, Australia. In the 2021 census, Woodleigh had a population of 10 people.

== Geography ==
The land use is a mixture of crop growing and grazing on both native vegetation and planted pastures.

== History ==
Cattle Gully State School opened in June 1910. In 1924, it was renamed Woodleighton State School. It closed in 1961. It was at 590 Quinalow Woodleigh Road (27.0845°S 151.6808°E).

== Demographics ==
In the 2016 census, Woodleigh had "no people or a very low population".

In the 2021 census, Woodleigh had a population of 10 people.

== Education ==
There are no schools in Woodleigh. The nearest government primary school is Quinalow State School in Quinalow to the south-west. The nearest government secondary school is Quinalow State School (to Year 10), Oakey State High School (to Year 12) in Oakey to the south, and Dalby State High School (to Year 12) in Dalby to the south-west. There are also non-government schools in Oakey and Dalby.
