= Upper Cooyar Creek, Queensland =

Upper Cooyar Creek
- Suburb
- Interactive map of Upper Cooyar Creek
- Coordinates: 26.9805°S 151.7280°E
- Country: Australia
- State: Queensland
- LGA: Toowoomba Region
- Location: 13.0 km (8.1 mi) W of Cooyar; 24.4 km (15.2 mi) NW of Quinalow; 40.3 km (25.0 mi) SW of Yarraman; 93.5 km (58.1 mi) N of Toowoomba; 209 km (130 mi) NW of Brisbane

Government
  - State electorate: Nanango
  - Federal divisions: Maranoa; Groom

Area
  - Total: 74.1 km^{2} (28.6 sq mi)

Population
  - Total: 16 (2021 census)
  - Density: 0.216/km^{2} (0.559/sq mi)
- Time zone: UTC+10:00 (AEST)
- Postcode: 4402
Suburbs around Upper Cooyar Creek
Bunya Mountains	Pimpimbudgee	Pimpimbudgee
Bunya Mountains	Upper Cooyar Creek	Cooyar
Rangemore	Maclagan; Nutgrove	Wutul

Upper Cooyar Creek is a rural locality in the Toowoomba Region, Queensland, Australia. In the 2021 census, Upper Cooyar Creek had a population of 16 people.

== Geography ==
The Great Dividing Range forms most of the western boundary of the locality, while the Cooyar Range forms most of the northern boundary. Cooyar Creek rises in the north-west of the locality and flows south-east, exiting to the east of the locality (Cooyar); it is a tributary of the Brisbane River within the North East Coast drainage basin.

The Cooyar Rangemore Road enters the locality from the east (Cooyar), travels in a westernly direction through the locality, and then exits to south-west (Rangemore).

Bunya Mountains National Park is in the north-west of the locality (where Cooyar Creek rises) and extends into the neighbouring locality of Bunya Mountains. Apart from this protected area, the land use is predominantly grazing on native vegetation with some crop growing and forestry.

== History ==
Cooyar Creek Upper Provisional School opened on 20 August 1924. It became Cooyar Creek State School on 1 August 1926 after being re-erected on a new site. It closed on 1 December 1940. It was at 1054 Cooyar Rangemore Road (26.9725°S 151.7374°E).

== Demographics ==
In the 2016 census, Upper Cooyar Creek had a population of 17 people.

In the 2021 census, Upper Cooyar Creek had a population of 16 people.

== Education ==
There are no schools in Upper Cooyar Creek. The nearest government primary schools are Cooyar State School in neighbouring Cooyar to the east and Quinalow State School in Quinalow to the south. The nearest government secondary schools are Quinalow State School (to Year 10) and Yarraman State School (to Year 9) in Yarraman to the north-east.

There are no nearby schools offering education to Year 12; the alternatives are distance education and boarding school.
