= Goombungee War Memorial =

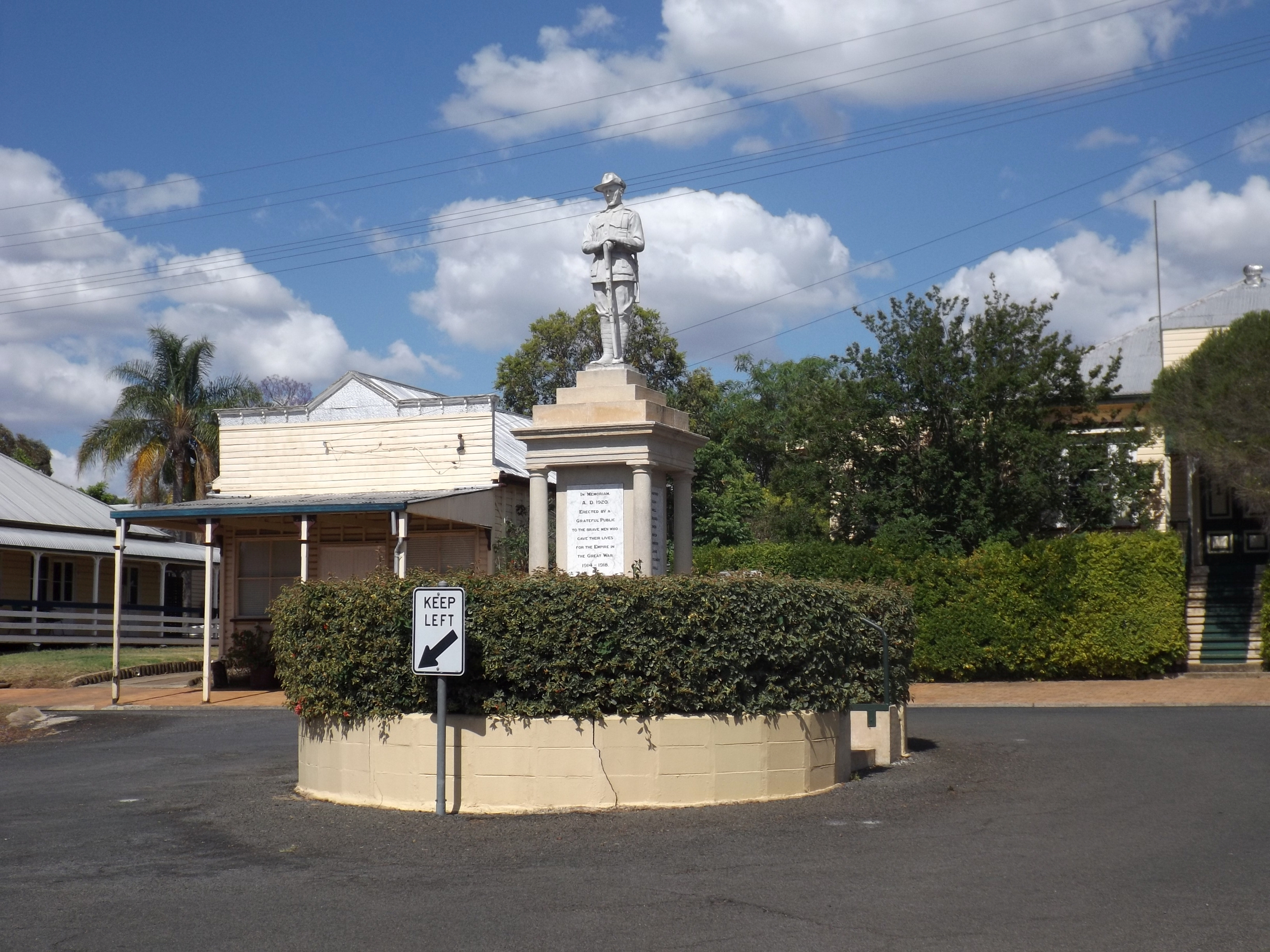
- War memorial in the centre of Kingsthorpe Haden Road, 2014

- Location within Queensland
- 27.3062°S 151.8515°E
- Location: Hartwig Street, Goombungee, Toowoomba Region, Queensland, Australia

History
- Design period: 1919–1930s (interwar period)
- Built: 1920–1920

Site notes
- Architect: Harry Marks

Queensland Heritage Register
- Official name: Goombungee War Memorial
- Type: state heritage (built)
- Designated: 21 October 1992
- Reference no.: 600826
- Significant period: 1920– (social); 1920 (historical, fabric)
- Significant components: memorial – plaque, memorial – soldier statue
- Builders: R C Ziegler and Son

Goombungee War Memorial is a heritage-listed memorial at Hartwig Street, Goombungee, Toowoomba Region, Queensland, Australia. It was built in 1920 by R C Ziegler and Son. The architect was Harry Marks. It was added to the Queensland Heritage Register on 21 October 1992.

== History ==
The Goombungee War Memorial was unveiled on 11 December 1920 by Major General Sir Thomas William Glasgow, and Brigadier-General James Campbell Robertson CB, CMG, DSO, MID (x7) represented the Toowoomba sub-branch of the R.S.S.I.L.A. It was designed by Henry James (Harry) Marks and produced by masons R C Ziegler and Son of the Downs Electric Monumental Works. The stone memorial honours the local men who fell in the First and Second World Wars.

In 1919, the residents of Goombungee wrote to the New South Wales Memorials Advisory Board for advice regarding its proposed memorial. The board referred their request to the Queensland Institute of Architects and Toowoomba architect Harry Marks subsequently prepared the design.

Henry (Harry) James Marks was born in Toowoomba in 1871. After training with his father James, also an architect, he entered into partnership with him in 1892. He was considered a creative designer and was responsible for many buildings on the Darling Downs as well as two Roman Catholic Churches in Brisbane. In 1925 he became an Associate of the Queensland Institute of Architects, becoming a Fellow 1929. He died in Toowoomba in 1939 after spending his entire career there. The memorial is an unusual example of his work.

Although the monument was produced by well known Toowoomba masons R C Ziegler and Son, it is likely that the digger statue was imported from Italy.

The firm of R C Ziegler and Son was established in Toowoomba in c. 1902 and produced many memorials throughout south western Queensland. The family company moved to Bundaberg where it was still operating in 2014.

== Significance of war memorials ==
Australia, and Queensland in particular, had few civic monuments before the First World War. The memorials erected in its wake became our first national monuments, recording the devastating impact of the war on a young nation. Australia lost 60,000 from a population of about 4 million, representing one in five of those who served. No previous or subsequent war has made such an impact on the nation.

Even before the end of the war, memorials became a spontaneous and highly visible expression of national grief. To those who erected them, they were as sacred as grave sites, substitute graves for the Australians whose bodies lay in battlefield cemeteries in Europe and the Middle East. British policy decreed that the Empire war dead were to be buried where they fell. The word "cenotaph", commonly applied to war memorials at the time, literally means "empty tomb".

Australian war memorials are distinctive in that they commemorate not only the dead. Australians were proud that their first great national army, unlike other belligerent armies, was composed entirely of volunteers, men worthy of honour whether or not they paid the supreme sacrifice. Many memorials honour all who served from a locality, not just the dead, providing valuable evidence of community involvement in the war. Such evidence is not readily obtainable from military records, or from state or national listings, where names are categorised alphabetically or by military unit.

Australian war memorials are also valuable evidence of imperial and national loyalties, at the time, not seen as conflicting; the skills of local stonemasons, metalworkers and architects; and of popular taste. In Queensland, the digger statue was the popular choice of memorial, whereas the obelisk predominated in the southern states, possibly a reflection of Queensland's larger working-class population and a lesser involvement of architects.

Many of the First World War monuments have been updated to record local involvement in later conflicts, and some have fallen victim to unsympathetic re-location and repair.

Although there are many different types of memorials in Queensland, the digger statue is the most common. It was the most popular choice of communities responsible for erecting the memorials, embodying the ANZAC Spirit and representing the qualities of the ideal Australian: loyalty, courage, youth, innocence and masculinity. The digger was a phenomenon peculiar to Queensland, perhaps due to the fact that other states had followed Britain's lead and established Advisory Boards made up of architects and artists, prior to the erection of war memorials. The digger statue was not highly regarded by artists and architects who were involved in the design of relatively few Queensland memorials.

Most statues were constructed by local masonry firms, although some were by artists or imported.

== Description ==
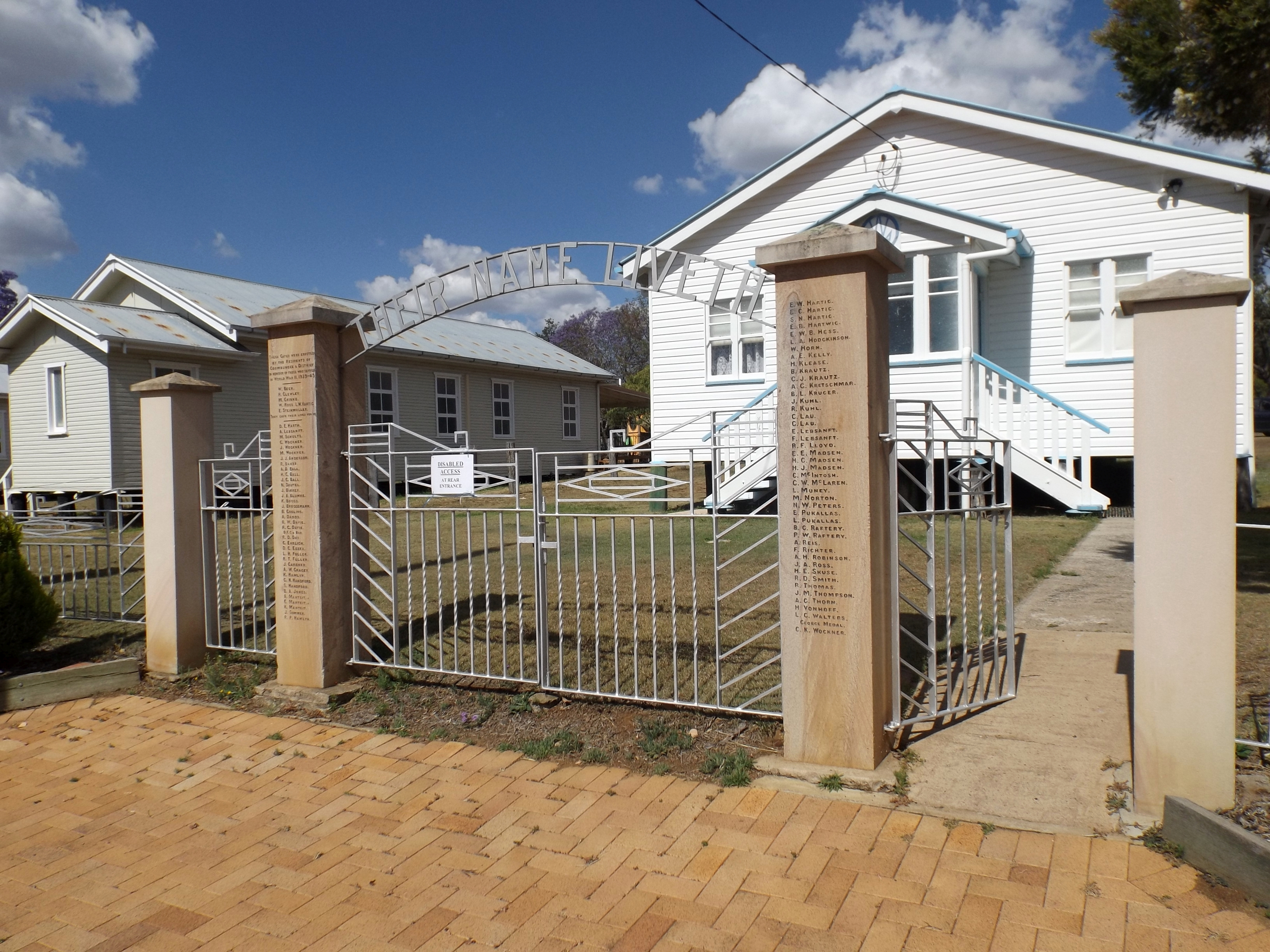
Goombungee War Memorial in front of the Country Women's Association building, 2014

The First World War Memorial is situated at the intersection of the two main streets in Goombungee.

The painted sandstone memorial comprises a pedestal surmounted by a digger statue.

It sits on a large square base of smooth-faced stone. Projecting from this is recessed square section with leaded marble plates on each face. These bear the names of the 29 local men who fell in the First World War and the 8 who fell in the Second World War. Also projecting from the base, at each corner are free-standing columns with Doric order capitals and bases. These support a large cornice consisting of a series of steps and mouldings.

The digger statue stands above this on a base of three steps, square in plan, of decreasing size. His head is bowed and his hands rest on the top of a rifle which is reversed.

== Heritage listing ==
Goombungee War Memorial was listed on the Queensland Heritage Register on 21 October 1992 having satisfied the following criteria.

The place is important in demonstrating the evolution or pattern of Queensland's history.

War Memorials are important in demonstrating the pattern of Queensland's history as they are representative of a recurrent theme that involved most communities throughout the state. They provide evidence of an era of widespread Australian patriotism and nationalism, particularly during and following the First World War.

The place is important in demonstrating the principal characteristics of a particular class of cultural places.

The monuments manifest a unique documentary record and are demonstrative of popular taste in the inter-war period.

Unveiled in 1920, the memorial at Goombungee demonstrates the principal characteristics of a commemorative structure erected as an enduring record of a major historical event. This is achieved through the use of appropriate materials and design elements. As a digger statue it is representative of the most popular form of memorial in Queensland.

The place is important because of its aesthetic significance.

This particular memorial is of aesthetic significance both as a dominant landmark and for its high degree of workmanship and design.

The place has a strong or special association with a particular community or cultural group for social, cultural or spiritual reasons.

It has a strong association with the community as evidence of the impact of a major historic event.

The place has a special association with the life or work of a particular person, group or organisation of importance in Queensland's history.

It also has special association with Toowoomba architect H J Marks as an unusual example of his work, and with monumental masons R C Ziegler and Son.
