= Wutul, Queensland =

Wutul
- Suburb
- Interactive map of Wutul
- Coordinates: 27.0311°S 151.7888°E
- Country: Australia
- State: Queensland
- LGA: Toowoomba Region
- Location: 54.7 km (34.0 mi) N of Oakey; 57.9 km (36.0 mi) SSW of Nanango; 80.7 km (50.1 mi) N of Toowoomba; 195 km (121 mi) NW of Brisbane

Government
  - State electorate: Nanango
  - Federal divisions: Maranoa; Groom

Area
  - Total: 39.0 km^{2} (15.1 sq mi)

Population
  - Total: 57 (2021 census)
  - Density: 1.462/km^{2} (3.79/sq mi)
- Time zone: UTC+10:00 (AEST)
- Postcode: 4352
Suburbs around Wutul
| Upper Cooyar Creek | Cooyar | Cooyar |
| Nutgrove | Wutul | East Cooyar |
| Nutgrove | Nutgrove | Thornville |

Wutul is a rural locality in the Toowoomba Region, Queensland, Australia. In the 2021 census, Wutul had a population of 57 people.

== Geography ==
The New England Highway passes through the locality from the south-east to the north-east, intersecting with the Oakey–Cooyar Road (State Route 68).

== History ==
Wutul takes its name from the Wutul railway station, which was named on 28 April 1913. It is reported to be an Aboriginal word indicating good grass.

The Cooyar railway line opened to Wutul on 28 April 1913 with the locality served by the Wutul railway station on the Oakey-Cooyar Road (approx 27.02741°S 151.80096°E). The line was partially closed beyond Acland on 1 May 1964, with the last segment closed on 8 December 1969.

Wutul State School opened on 14 September 1914 and closed in 1961. It was on the Oakey-Cooyar Road (approx 27.02882°S 151.79877°E).

== Demographics ==
In the 2016 census, Wutul had a population of 37 people.

In the 2021 census, Wutul had a population of 57 people.

== Education ==
There are no schools in Wutul. The nearest government primary school is Cooyar State School in neighbouring Cooyar to the north.

The nearest government secondary schools are:

- Nanango State High School (to Year 12) in Nanango the north-east
- Oakey State High School (to Year 12) in Oakey to the south
- Quinalow State School (to Year 10) in Quinalow to the south-west

However, students in some parts of Wutul will be too distant from these secondary schools. The alternatives are distance education and boarding school.
