= R C Ziegler and Son =

R C Ziegler Monumentals is a firm of monumental masons in Queensland, Australia. They built many heritage-listed war memorials in Queensland and served many areas of Queensland and Northern NSW for over 100 years by installing handcrafted, custom made headstones and memorials.

In 2026, Zieglers now operate from a private residential address and service areas in the Darling Downs, Lockyer Valley, South Burnett, Maranoa, Central Qld and more by supplying and installing headstones and lawn plaques. The current owners have owned the company for over 35 years.

RC Ziegler Monumentals has no affiliation with Ziegler Memorials who are located in Bundaberg, Qld.

== History ==
The firm was established in Toowoomba circa 1912 and undertook monumental masonry commissions throughout south-western Queensland.

== Significant works ==
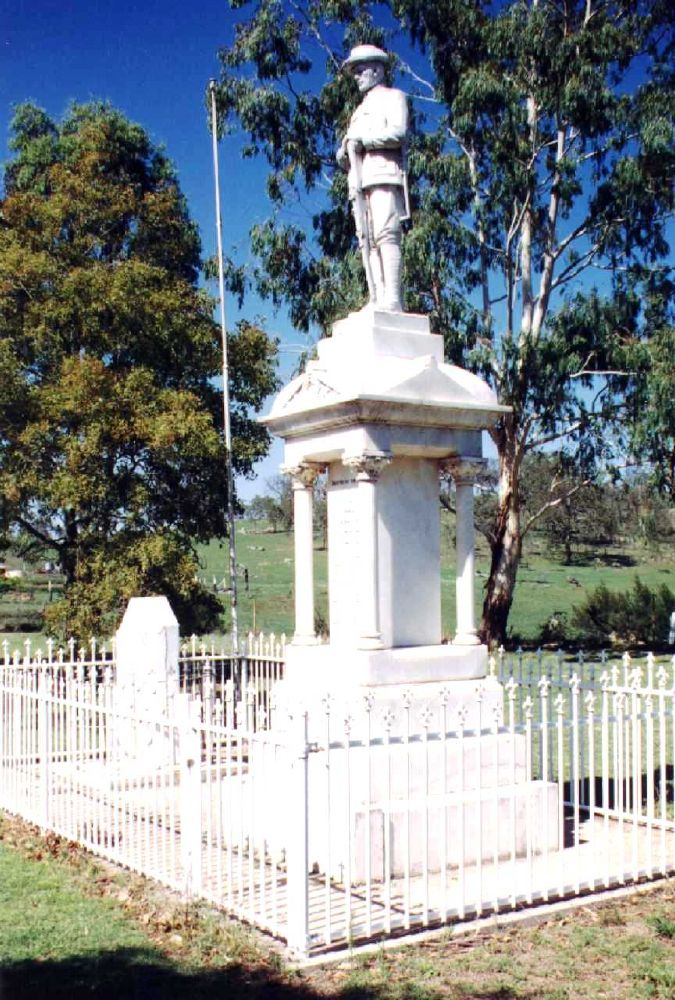
Cooyar War Memorial

- 1920: Goombungee War Memorial
- 1923: Cooyar War Memorial
- 1924: Charleville War Memorial
- 1926: Cunnamulla War Memorial Fountain
- 1949: Bundaberg War Nurses Memorial
