= Centaur (ship) =

Centaur may refer to one of the following ships:

- AHS Centaur, an Australian hospital ship sunk in 1943
- HMS Centaur, eight ships of the British Royal Navy
- SB Centaur, Thames sailing barge
