= Mount Binga, Queensland =

Mount Binga
- Suburb
- Interactive map of Mount Binga
- Coordinates: 27.0225°S 151.9588°E
- Country: Australia
- State: Queensland
- LGA: Toowoomba Region
- Location: 49.2 km (30.6 mi) S of Nanango; 81.6 km (50.7 mi) N of Toowoomba CBD; 173 km (107 mi) NW of Brisbane

Government
  - State electorate: Nanango
  - Federal division: Maranoa

Area
  - Total: 91.4 km^{2} (35.3 sq mi)

Population
  - Total: 86 (2021 census)
  - Density: 0.941/km^{2} (2.437/sq mi)
- Time zone: UTC+10:00 (AEST)
- Postcode: 4314
Suburbs around Mount Binga
Kooralgin	Kooralgin	Gilla
Cooyar	Mount Binga	Googa Creek
East Cooyar	St Aubyn	Emu Creek

Mount Binga is a rural locality in the Toowoomba Region, Queensland, Australia. In the 2021 census, Mount Binga had a population of 86 people.

== History ==
The locality takes its name from the mountain, and is believed to be an Aboriginal word meaning ants.

Mount Binga Provisional School opened in 1919 and closed in 1922.

On 1 February 2018, Mount Binga's postcode changed from 4306 to 4314.

== Demographics ==
In the 2016 census, Mount Binga had a population of 67 people.

In the 2021 census, Mount Binga had a population of 86 people.

== Education ==
There are no schools in Mount Binga. The nearest government primary schools are Cooyar State School in neighbouring Cooyar to the west and Blackbutt State School in Blackbutt to the north-east. The nearest government secondary schools are Yarraman State School (to Year 9) in Yarraman to the north, Crow's Nest State School in Crows Nest to the south-east, and Nanango State High School (to Year 12) in Nanango to the north.
