= Muntapa Tunnel =

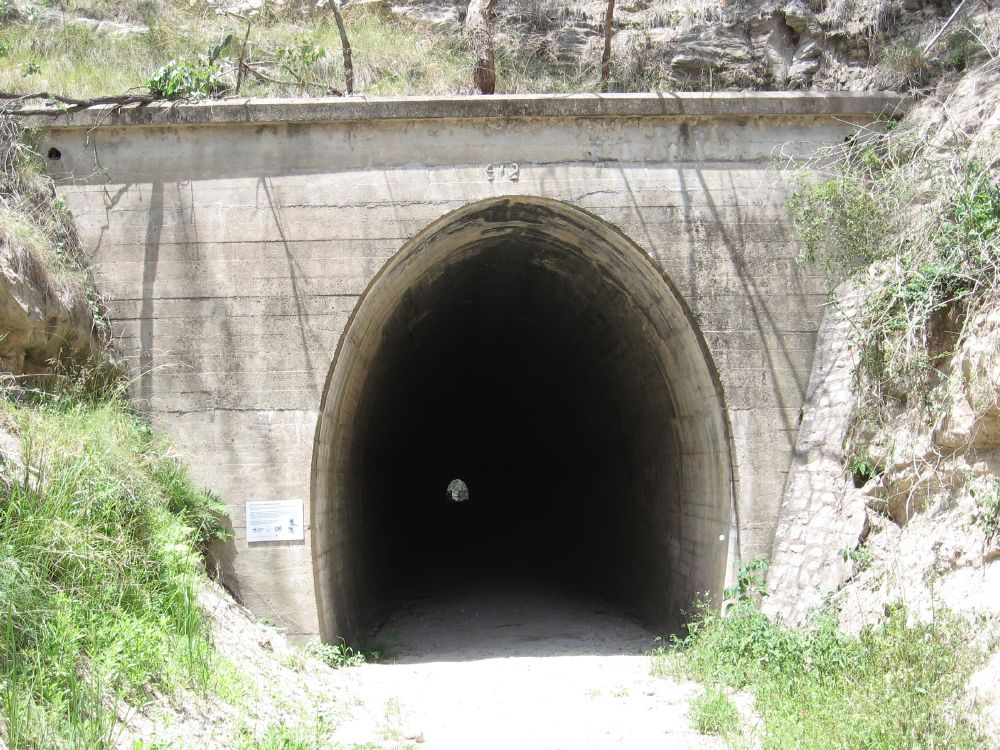

- Location within Queensland Location within Australia
- 27.0758°S 151.7481°E
- Location: Narko-Nutgrove Road, Highgrove, Toowoomba Region, Queensland, Australia

History
- Design period: 1900 - 1914 (early 20th century)
- Built: 1910-1913

Site notes
- Architect: Queensland Railways

Queensland Heritage Register
- Official name: Muntapa Tunnel
- Type: state heritage (built)
- Designated: 3 May 2007
- Reference no.: 602594
- Significant components: tunnel - railway
- Builders: Queensland Railways

Muntapa Tunnel is a heritage-listed tunnel from Narko-Nutgrove Road, Highgrove through to Nutgrove, both in the Toowoomba Region, Queensland, Australia. It was designed by Queensland Railways and built from 1910 to 1913 by Queensland Railways. It was added to the Queensland Heritage Register on 3 May 2007.

== History ==
The Muntapa Tunnel is a concrete railway tunnel located on the Cooyar railway line, a former branch line linking Oakey to Cooyar in the eastern Darling Downs. The tunnel is one of a small number built on a branch line and it is the only tunnel in Queensland that crosses between the inland and coastal sides of the Great Dividing Range. It was opened in 1913.

Branch lines were secondary railway lines designed to connect rural districts with the main rail routes. They were constructed with the aim of supporting small-scale agriculturalists, dairy farmers and the timber industry. Branch lines were generally of cheaper construction than main lines, more frequent stops were provided and they were often built on road easements to reduce the costs stemming from land resumptions. The first branch line, opened on 12 July 1882, ran from Ipswich to Harrisville. The advent of better roads and faster road transport from the interwar period, eventually led to their demise.

The area between Oakey and Cooyar was populated by small-scale farmers, many of whom were of German origin. The lack of a viable transport route to market hindered the profitability of these small farms. Bullock transport was uneconomic and slow. When arguing the case for a branch line to Cooyar, the Commissioner for Railways, J. Thallon, noted that farms needed to be within 10–12 miles (16–19 km) of a railway line to be viable.

Construction of a branch line to Cooyar had been advocated for some years. As well as improving the viability of farms and stimulating closer settlement along the route, the line would provide Toowoomba and the Darling Downs with access to much needed timber reserves at Blackbutt and Nanango. Of secondary consideration was a proposal to eventually extend the line to connect with Nanango and ultimately Central Queensland.

The line was approved by parliament in 1909 and construction began in September 1910. The principal work on the railway was on the 287-metre (942 ft) long tunnel at Muntapa. This remains the only tunnel in Queensland that passes beneath the summit of the Great Dividing Range. There are nine tunnels where the main western line from Ipswich climbs the Range en route to Toowoomba, but none of these pass underneath the summit. Tunnelling was a more economic alternative than routing the line around the summit.

The tunnel interior is formed from concrete and it has concrete portals. Concrete was first used in 1880 for the Cherry Gully Tunnel on the Warwick to Stanthorpe line. It was found to be more economical than brick or masonry.

The railway to Cooyar was one of seven branches of the Western Line that was built by day labour. Day labour construction of railways had been introduced by the conservative government in 1901. The practise continued until the mid-1920s. To carry out this work, Queensland Rail maintained a construction branch with engineers and plant and employed construction workers on a temporary basis.

Initially, the revenue raised on the branch exceeded working expenses. Transport of timber peaked in 1915 and from that year coal also began to be railed from the area of Acland. However, from 1916, the branch struggled to remain profitable due to under-utilisation and from 1926, road transport began to seriously affect the profitability of branch lines. This decline was offset, for a time, by cost-cutting measures and the introduction of rail motors. Petrol rationing forced greater use of the rail network by the public during World War II and this improved profitability while rationing remained in place. However, the cost of recovering from neglected maintenance during the War added to the ever-increasing use of motor vehicles accelerated the closure of branch lines after the War.

On 1 May 1964, the line beyond Acland was closed. The Acland to Oakey section was kept open to support the operation of the coalmines at Acland. The mines' principal customer was Queensland Rail. In the late 1960s, when Queensland Rail completed the conversion of their locomotive fleet to diesel all but one of these mines closed. On 8 December 1969, the Oakey to Acland section was also closed.

The tunnel is now contains the winter roosting site of up to 8,000 bent-wing bats: Miniopterus schreibersii. A picnic table and walking track circuit starting from the picnic area passes through the tunnel.

== Description ==
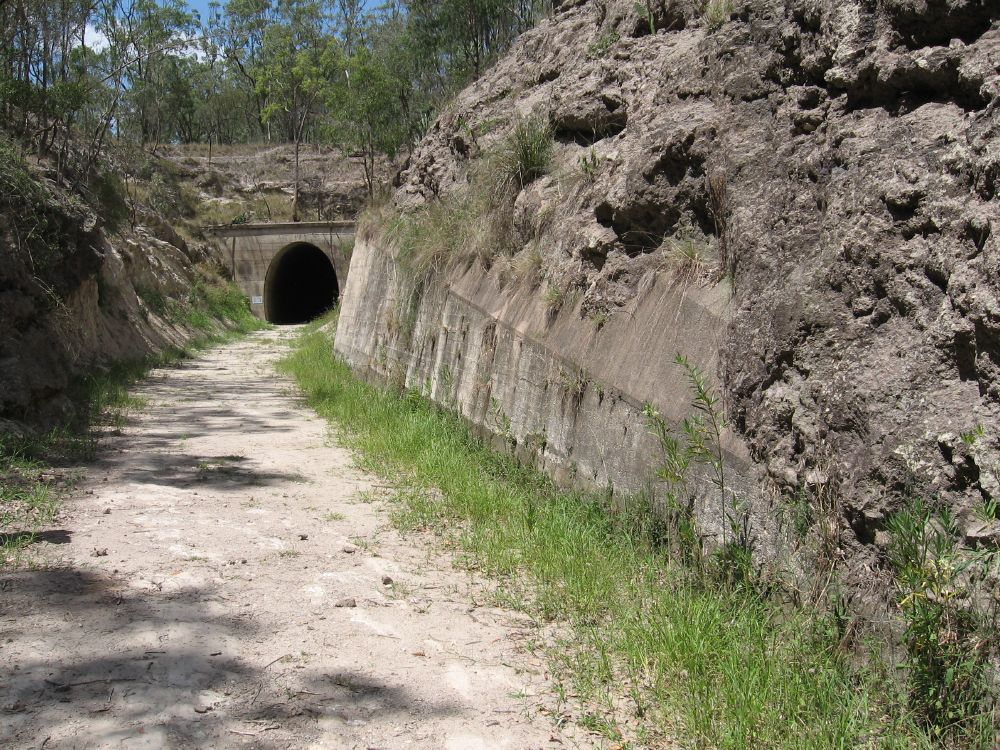
The rail line leading up to the tunnel

The Muntapa Tunnel is a former railway tunnel set in isolated bushland about 40 kilometres (25 mi) north of Oakey. The tunnel is located in a deep cutting along which the former railway line from Oakey to Cooyar ran.

The tunnel is semi-elliptical in cross-section. It is around 280 metres (920 ft) in length running from north east to south west. A section of cliff around each entrance is faced with a concrete wall which is topped with a shallow projecting ledge. The year "1912" had been embossed above the entrance at the south western end. However this has heavily worn so that only "912" remains visible. A steel gate of about 2 metres (6 ft 7 in) in height encloses the north eastern entrance.

The interior of the tunnel is formed from concrete. Away from the entrance, this has become blackened. The floor is sandy, except towards the middle of the tunnel where the base becomes coarse gravel.

The entrances to the tunnel are approached at both ends via a cutting. At the north eastern end, the cutting extends about 38 metres (125 ft) from the entrance. At the south western end, it curves towards the south and extends about 150 metres (490 ft). The floor of each cutting is level and approximately 5 metres (16 ft) wide. A 22-metre-long (72 ft) concrete wall extends along the eastern side of the cutting beginning about 31 metres (102 ft) from the south western entrance.

The tunnel penetrates the ridge which forms the summit of the Great Dividing Range. The terrain is rocky and sparsely vegetated, comprising open eucalypt woodland.

== Heritage listing ==
Muntapa Tunnel was listed on the Queensland Heritage Register on 3 May 2007 having satisfied the following criteria.

The place is important in demonstrating the evolution or pattern of Queensland's history.

Muntapa Tunnel is important in demonstrating the evolution of Queensland's history insofar that it constitutes physical evidence of a Queensland Government policy to construct branch lines as a means of developing rural districts. The tunnel was the most substantial work on a branch line that ran from Oakey to Cooyar. The railway was built to Cooyar in ca1913 to support the development of small-scale agriculture in the area and to provide Toowoomba and the Darling Downs with access to timber reserves at Blackbutt and Nanango. Hence, it is also evidence of the development of closer settlement in the eastern Darling Downs in the early 20th century.

The place demonstrates rare, uncommon or endangered aspects of Queensland's cultural heritage.

Muntapa Tunnel is the only tunnel in Queensland that crosses the summit of the Great Dividing Range. Nine tunnels exist on the section of the main western line from Ipswich that ascends the Range en route to Toowoomba but none of these passes underneath the summit. The decision was made to tunnel under the summit at Muntapa because it was a more economic alternative than routing the line around it.

The place is important in demonstrating the principal characteristics of a particular class of cultural places.

The tunnel is important as a highly intact example of a concrete railway tunnel. Concrete was first used in 1880 for the Cherry Gully Tunnel on the Warwick to Stanthorpe line. The Muntapa Tunnel has concrete portals and a semi-elliptical cross-section formed completely with concrete.

The place is important because of its aesthetic significance.

The tunnel has a regular elliptical cross-section and it displays pleasing qualities of symmetry. It evokes surprise due to its unexpected location in remote bushland with no other visible railway infrastructure nearby. This response to the tunnel is heightened by its position, hidden within a deep cutting. It is only visible from within the cutting or close to its edge. The place also conveys a sense of the isolation experienced by the tunnel's builders.
