= Cooyar, Queensland =

Cooyar
- Town
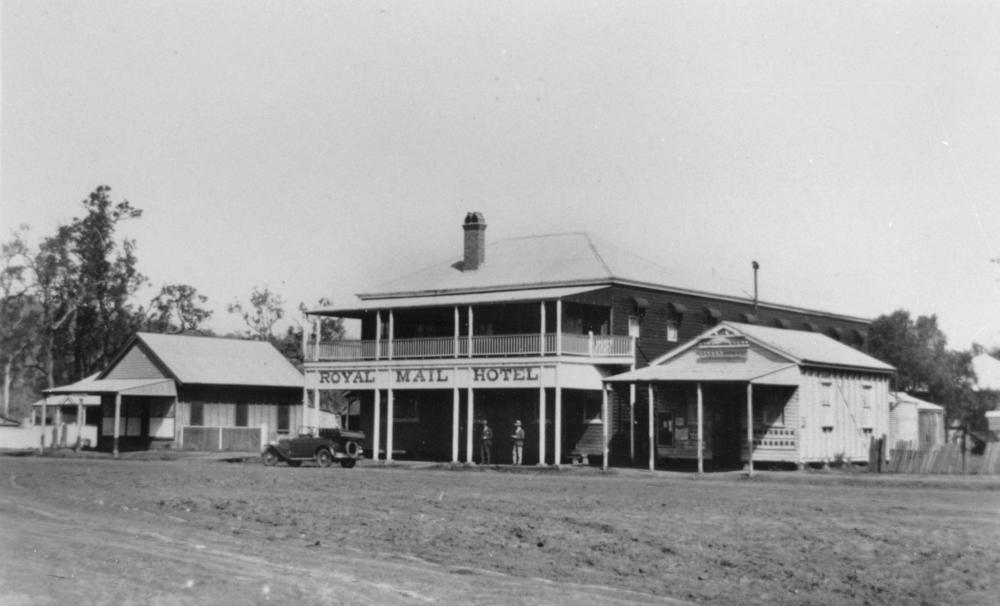
- Royal Mail Hotel in Cooyar, ca. 1928

- Interactive map of Cooyar
- Coordinates: 26.9816°S 151.835°E
- Country: Australia
- State: Queensland
- LGA: Toowoomba Region
- Location: 48.3 km (30.0 mi) SW of Nanango; 89.6 km (55.7 mi) N of Toowoomba CBD; 179 km (111 mi) NW of Brisbane

Government
  - State electorate: Nanango
  - Federal division: Maranoa

Area
  - Total: 94.6 km^{2} (36.5 sq mi)

Population
  - Total: 231 (2021 census)
  - Density: 2.442/km^{2} (6.324/sq mi)
- Time zone: UTC+10:00 (AEST)
- Postcode: 4402
- County: Cavendish
- Parish: Cooyar
Localities around Cooyar
Pimpimbudgee	Neumgna	Upper Yarraman
Upper Cooyar Creek	Cooyar	Kooralgin
Wutul	East Cooyar	Mount Binga

Cooyar is a rural town and locality in the Toowoomba Region, Queensland, Australia. In the 2021 census, the locality of Cooyar had a population of 231 people.

== Geography ==
Cooyar is on the Darling Downs and on the New England Highway, 204 kilometres (127 mi) north west of the state capital, Brisbane.

== History ==
Land in Cooyar was open for selection on 17 April 1877; 18,500 acres (7,500 ha) were available.

Cooyar Post Office opened by March 1907 (a receiving office had been open from 1904).

St Francis' Anglican Church was dedicated on 12 April 1928. Its closure on 28 March 1999 was approved by Assistant Bishop Ray Smith.

== Demographics ==
In the 2011 census, the locality of Cooyar and the surrounding area had a population of 281 people.

In the 2016 census, the locality of Cooyar had a population of 224 people.

In the 2021 census, the locality of Cooyar had a population of 231 people.

== Heritage listings ==
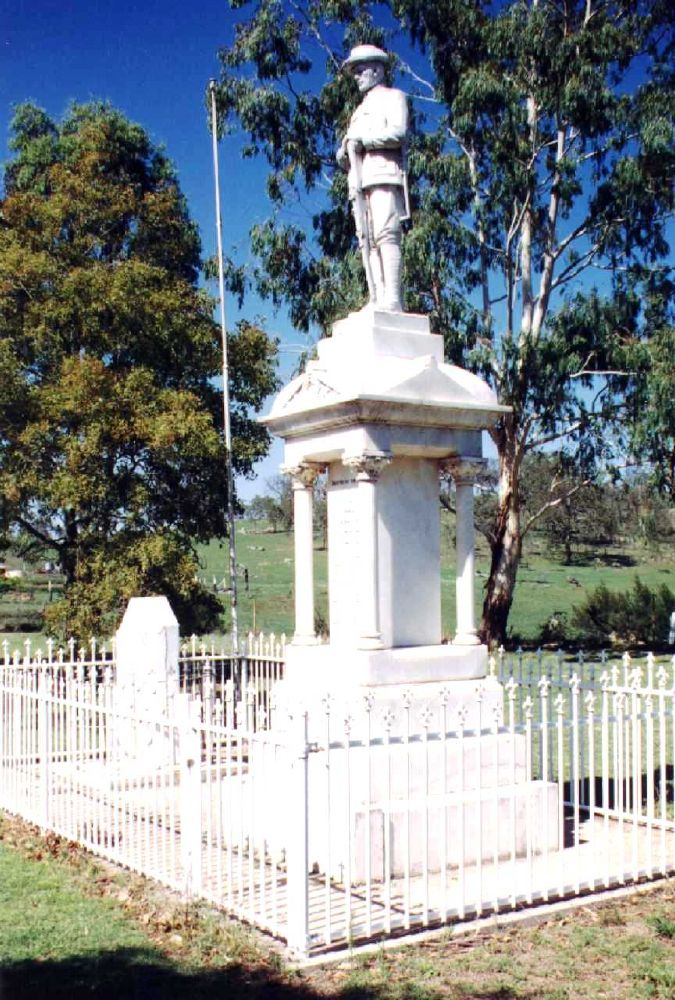
Cooyar War Memorial

Cooyar has a number of heritage-listed sites, including:

- Cooyar War Memorial, McDougall Street
- Muntapa Tunnel, Narko-Nutgrove Road from Highgrove to Nutgrove, south-west of Cooyar

== Education ==
Cooyar State School is a government primary (Prep-6) school for boys and girls at Gracey Street (26.9852°S 151.8328°E). In 2018, the school had an enrolment of 39 students with 4 teachers (3 full-time equivalent) and 5 non-teaching staff (2 full-time equivalent).

There are no secondary schools in Cooyar. The nearest government secondary schools are Nanango State High School (to Year 12) in Nanango to the north-east, Yarraman State School (to Year 9) in Yarraman to the north-east, and Quinalow State School (to Year 10) in Quinalow to the south-west.

== Amenities ==
Library services in Cooyar are provided by the Toowoomba Regional Council's mobile library service. The van visits Cooyar State School and Cooyar Park (McDougal Street) on the 1st and 3rd Tuesday of each month.

== Attractions ==
Attractions in Cooyar include the Swinging Bridge, a memorial park with playground, an ANZAC Memorial, and the showground which holds events such as endurance riding and the annual show.
